= Alternative five model of personality =

The alternative five factor model of personality is based on the claim that the structure of human personality traits is best explained by five broad factors called impulsive sensation seeking (ImpSS), (Note: This trait is also known under the name "impulsive unsocialized sensation seeking (ImpUSS).) neuroticism–anxiety (N-Anx), aggression–hostility (Agg-Host), sociability (Sy), and activity (Act). The model was developed by Marvin Zuckerman and colleagues as a rival to the well-known five factor model of personality traits and is based on the assumption that "basic" personality traits are those with a strong biological-evolutionary basis. One of the salient differences between these two models is that the alternative five model lacks any equivalent to the dimension called openness to experience in the five factor model.

== Development of the model ==
The aim of Zuckerman and colleagues in developing the alternative five model was to identify the "basic" factors of personality. Zuckerman argued that basic factors have a biological-evolutionary basis as evidenced by comparable traits in non-human species, biological markers, and moderate heritability. The model was developed by administering research participants a large number of pre-existing personality questionnaires and subjecting the results to factor analysis. The questionnaires were selected based on their use in psychobiological research. Questionnaires used included the Jackson Personality Inventory, the Personality Research Form, the Eysenck Personality Questionnaire, the sensation seeking scale and several others including a measure of social desirability. Markers such as "agreeableness" and "conscientiousness" were deliberately excluded on the basis that these traits are not present in non-human species. The researchers compared models with three to seven different factors. They found that both three and five factor solutions were acceptable, but argued that the five-factor solution was preferable due to greater specificity.

=== Nature of the five factors ===
- Neuroticism–anxiety: measures anxiety, fear, general emotionality, psychasthenia, and inhibition of aggression. The factor is also associated with obsessive indecisiveness, lack of self-confidence, and sensitivity to criticism.
- Aggression–hostility vs. social desirability: measures aggression, hostility, anger, lack of inhibitory control, and low social desirability. The factor is associated with rudeness, thoughtless and antisocial behaviour, vengefulness, quick temper and impatience.
- Impulsive sensation-seeking: measures low socialisation, and high psychoticism, impulsivity, and sensation-seeking. The impulsivity items assess lack of planfulness and a tendency to act without thinking. The sensation seeking items describe a liking for thrills and excitement, novelty and variety, and unpredictable situations and friends.
- Sociability: measures affiliation, social participation, extraversion. Assesses liking for big parties and interactions with many people, as well as a dislike of isolation in sociable people versus a liking for the same in unsociable people.
- Activity: measures energetic behavior and persistence. This factor is associated with need to keep active and feelings of restlessness when there is nothing to do.

A self-report measure called the Zuckerman-Kuhlman Personality Questionnaire, Form III, Revised (ZKPQ) has been developed to assess these five traits. It consists of 99 items in a true-false format. In addition to scales measuring the five factors, it contains an "infrequency" validity scale. Endorsement of these items indicates exaggerated social desirability, as the items are unlikely to be true. The ImpSS scale differs from the sensation seeking scale in that it deliberately omits items mentioning specific activities such as drinking, sex, drugs, or risky sports. These items were omitted to facilitate research study of these activities to avoid correlations based purely on similarity between the items and the activities. The ZKPQ has been translated into German, Catalan, Spanish, Chinese, and Japanese.

== Comparison with other personality models ==
The factors in the alternative Five model correspond to traits in Eysenck's three factor model, and to four of the five traits in the Five factor model. Neuroticism-anxiety is basically identical to neuroticism, while sociability is very similar to extraversion in the Eysenck and five factor models. Impulsive sensation-seeking is positively correlated with psychoticism from Eysenck's model, and negatively with conscientiousness in the five factor model, and it has been argued that psychopathy represents an extreme form of this trait. Aggression-hostility is inversely related to agreeableness in the five factor model. Zuckerman and colleagues noted that Activity is subsumed under extraversion in some models of personality but argued that it should be considered an independent dimension of temperament that is distinct from sociability. A later study comparing Zuckerman's model with the Five Factor model using factor analysis found that Activity, sociability, and extraversion all loaded onto a single factor, suggesting that Activity and extraversion are closely related.

=== Relationship to Temperament and Character Inventory ===
A study by Zuckerman and Cloninger explored the relationships between the alternative five model and the Temperament and Character Inventory (TCI), another psychobiological model. Novelty seeking was strongly related to Impulsive sensation seeking and to a lesser extent to sociability. Harm avoidance was positively correlated with N-Anx and negatively with sociability. Zuckerman and Cloninger contended that Harm Avoidance is a composite dimension comprising neurotic introversion at one end and stable extraversion at the other end. Persistence was related to Activity, reflecting a preference for hard or challenging work measured in the latter scale. Cooperativeness was inversely related to the Aggression-hostility scale. The other TCI dimensions had more modest correlations with the alternative five. Reward dependence had a moderate positive association with sociability, and modest negative correlations with Agg-Host and ImpSS. Self-directedness was negatively correlated with N-Anx and to a lesser extent Agg-Host, and had a moderate positive association with Activity. Self-transcendence had a moderate positive association with Impulsive sensation seeking.

=== Omission of openness to experience ===
Zuckerman has argued that openness to experience does not meet the criteria for a truly "basic" factor of personality. Zuckerman stated that the personality factors in the alternative five model have an evolutionary basis and can be identified in non-human species but this is not the case for openness. Additionally, of the six facet scales used to define openness, only one of them (Actions) pertains to behaviour. The sensation-seeking scales on the other hand are more behavioral in content, and sensation-seeking does not have a clearly defined relationship to the five factor model, suggesting it is related to an independent basic factor.

The decision by Zuckerman and colleagues to deliberately omit markers of openness to experience from their analysis was strongly criticised by Costa and McCrae, proponents of the five factor model (FFM). Costa and McCrae reanalysed the data used by Zuckerman and colleagues and found that equivalents of all five factors in the FFM, including openness emerged in their factor analysis. Even though Zuckerman and colleagues had deliberately attempted to omit all markers of openness, Costa and McCrae argued that "cognitive structure" (dislike of ambiguity or uncertainty in information) is a valid marker of (low) openness. Cognitive structure formed part of a factor in this analysis along with other traits known to be associated with openness including experience seeking from the sensation-seeking scale, and "autonomy" (Note: Autonomy refers to independence of judgment. Autonomy helped define an openness factor in a previous factor analysis involving the Personality Research Form and the NEO-PI.) from the Personality Research Form. A study comparing Zuckerman's model with the Five Factor model found that openness to experience did appear to be a separate personality dimension from the other traits in the five factor model and the alternative five.
