= Persistence (psychology) =

Personality trait in psychology

Persistence is a personality trait, describing an individual's propensity to remain motivated, resilient, and goal-driven in the face of challenges and difficulties they may encounter whilst carrying out tasks and working towards goals. Identified by psychiatrist C. Robert Cloninger in his Psychobiological Model of Personality, persistence more precisely refers to "perseverance in spite of fatigue or frustration". According to Cloninger, this perseverance demonstrates a psychological determination that is foundational in aiding an individual's long-term success in achieving goals.

== Background ==
C. Robert Cloninger's work focuses primarily on personality and well-being. Cloninger outlined his model of personality by distinguishing between what he described as temperament and character traits. Temperament refers to genetically based differences in a range of behavioural and emotional characteristics which emerge early in an individual's life. Initially, the model comprised three temperament dimensions:

1. Novelty seeking (NS), the tendency towards exploratory activity, impulsivity and excitement or response to rewards.
2. Harm avoidance (HM), leaning towards caution and fear, and unable to act due to fear of punishment.
3. Reward dependence (RD), the tendency to respond well to rewards and approval.

However, upon the application of the Tridimensional Personality Questionnaire (TPQ), the first tool designed to measure these three dimensions, Cloninger determined that the existing subscale for Reward Dependence, 'persistence: the ability to keep up behavior through frustration and fatigue, was significantly distinct from each of these dimensions. Hence, persistence is now considered one of the four individually inherited temperament traits.

This model was further adjusted to include three supplementary dimensions of character, which are experience-acquired traits that develop over a lifetime:

- Cooperativeness (CO): The amount that an individual relates to others
- Self-transcendence (SF): the level an individual identifies with the universe
- Self-directedness (SD): The ability of a person to adapt their behavior to align with their goals

Together with the four temperament dimensions, these character traits form Cloninger's 7-factor model of personality.

== Genetic and biological underpinnings ==
This psychobiological model argues that personality is formed through interactions between genetic predispositions that emerge during early life, neurobiological processes and environmental influences (i.e., learning and social influences). Research with twin and family studies supports this claim, finding that persistence, like the other temperament traits, is moderately heritable. For example, twin analyses indicate that approximately 23% of the genetic variance found in TPQ results was specific to persistence. However, this was only the case for women. Whilst PS was also a distinct temperament dimension in men, it could not be concluded that there was a genetic component to this trait.

The original three temperament traits have each been intensively studied and subsequently associated with specific neurotransmitter activity, including dopaminergic, serotonergic and noradrenergic systems, whilst there is comparatively limited evidence for the specific neurobiological systems implicated in PS. Despite this, Cloninger hypothesised that persistence is shaped by neurobiology. In particular, it is thought to be associated with the dopaminergic neurotransmitter system, which plays a crucial role in drive, goal-oriented behaviour, and reward processing, all key elements to persistence. However, sufficient empirical support for this theory is yet to be provided.

== Measurement ==
Persistence is measured with the Temperament and Character Inventory (TCI), an assessment tool designed by Cloninger to assess and measure the seven dimensions of personality as previously outlined in his psychobiological personality model. The TCI incorporates neurobiological and environmental components in an attempt to provide an extensive understanding of individual differences in personality and their potential causes. The revised version (TCI-R) contains 240 items and a Likert scale rating system for each statement to measure the traits more precisely.

The traits each have subscales. Persistence is assessed using a 35-item scale measuring elements such as perseverance and resolution towards achieving goals and committing to tasks.

The subscales of PS in TCI-R consist of 4 behaviour archetypes associated with the trait:

1. Eagerness of effort (PS1) – Measures attitudes towards putting effort into tasks, particularly when a reward is anticipated.
2. Work hardened (PS2) – Indicates an individual's willingness to expend persisting effort in their tasks or goals.
3. Ambitious (PS3) – Assesses how motivated, goal-focused, aspiring and determined an individual is.
4. Perfectionist (PS4) – Refers to an individual's propensity to set unreasonably high standards and be overly self-critical.

=== Interpretation of persistence subscale scores ===
Scores on the PS subscales provide researchers with a more thorough understanding of an individual's approach to tasks and challenges. Those scoring highly in persistence are understood to remain hardworking, overachieving and committed to their goals in the face of challenges, whilst the inverse can be said for those with low levels of PS.

The following describes the characteristics that individuals who score highly in each of the four subscales are likely to display:

- (PS1) Increased efforts in the expectation of rewards and voluntarily taking on new tasks and setting challenges.
- (PS2) A strong work ethic and invest a lot of time into succeeding in their endeavours.
- (PS3) High standards for themselves, discipline and relentlessness in reaching their goals.
- (PS4) diligence in achieving flawlessness in their projects and meticulous attention to detail.

However, there has been slightly mixed empirical support for Cloninger's model and his TCI-R as a measure of his personality dimensions.

== Relationship to other personality models ==
Persistence (as measured using the TCI-R) has been related to various dimensions within other psychological personality models.

A study comparing the Temperament and Character Inventory to the Five-Factor Model of personality found that persistence is substantially positively associated with facets of conscientiousness, a trait describing how disciplined, organised and responsible (or norm-abiding) an individual is. Those high in PS were also likely to display high levels of conscientiousness, with particular emphasis on the elements of perfectionism and diligence.

Research also found that persistence is positively correlated with the Activity scale, a component within the sensation-seeking dimension of Zuckerman's Alternative Five Personality model. The activity scale in the Zuckerman Personality Questionnaire (ZKPQ) measures an individual's tendency to relentlessly pursue mentally- and physically-stimulating or challenging tasks, behaviours which are associated with persistence.

Additionally, studies indicated that PS is negatively correlated with psychoticism (P) in Eysenck's model. This dimension describes an individual's tendency to behave in an irresponsible, aggressive, impulsive, and norm-violating manners, traits which are not present in those who display high levels of persistence.

== Improvement ==
Studies using the TCI identified persistence as an adaptive trait that helps individuals achieve success in education, employment, and general well-being. These findings have, therefore, been applied to the clinical field, providing a foundation for the development of psychiatric techniques designed to increase persistent tendencies such as motivation, perseverance and discipline, which some individuals may have difficulty with.

Researchers investigated two types of action for improving persistence:

1. "Logic-of-consequence," where a person tries to become more aware of the expected positive outcomes of persevering to motivate themself to persist. These interventions can encourage individuals to think in terms of the benefits/rewards of being persistent in their tasks and goals. For example, they may tell themselves: 'If I try harder, I will get good grades'. Studies have found that they can have beneficial effects on academic achievement among students with poor performance.
2. "Logic-of-appropriateness", in which persevering is seen as coherent with one's self-image as a persistent person. Here, an individual considers what behaviours are appropriate given their identity or how a goal-oriented person would behave, leaning into the identity of a persistent/motivated/diligent person to encourage it within themselves. Studies investigating role-playing interventions provided evidence that this technique enhances effort and discipline.

== See also ==
- Continence – Aspect of inhibitory control
- Courage – Ability to deal with fear
- Determination – Positive emotional feeling
- Endurance – Ability of an organism to exert itself and remain active for a long period of time
- Grit – Psychological concept
- Psychological resilience – Ability to mentally cope with a crisis
- Sisu – Finnish concept
