= Temperament and Character Inventory =

System used in psychology

The Temperament and Character Inventory (TCI) is an inventory for personality traits devised by Cloninger et al. It is closely related to and an outgrowth of the Tridimensional Personality Questionnaire (TPQ), and it has also been related to the dimensions of personality in Zuckerman's alternative five and Eysenck's models and those of the five factor model.

TCI operates with seven dimensions of personality traits: four so-called temperaments

- Novelty seeking (NS)
- Harm avoidance (HA)
- Reward dependence (RD)
- Persistence (PS)

and three so-called characters

- Self-directedness (SD)
- Cooperativeness (CO)
- Self-transcendence (ST)

Each of these traits has a varying number of subscales. The dimensions are determined from a 240-item questionnaire.

The TCI is based on a psychobiological model that attempts to explain the underlying causes of individual differences in personality traits.

== Versions ==
Originally developed in English, TCI has been translated to other languages, e.g., Swedish, Japanese, Dutch, German, Polish, Korean, Finnish, Chinese and French. There is also a revised version TCI-R. Whereas the original TCI had statements for which the subject should indicate true or false, the TCI-R has a five-point rating for each statement. The two versions hold 189 of the 240 statements in common. The revised version has been translated into Spanish, French, Czech, and Italian.

The number of subscales on the different top level traits differ between TCI and TCI-R. The subscales of the TCI-R are:

- Novelty seeking (NS)
  1. Exploratory excitability (NS1)
  2. Impulsiveness (NS2)
  3. Extravagance (NS3)
  4. Disorderliness (NS4)
- Harm avoidance (HA)
  1. Anticipatory worry (HA1)
  2. Fear of uncertainty (HA2)
  3. Shyness (HA3)
  4. Fatigability (HA4)
- Reward dependence (RD)
  1. Sentimentality (RD1)
  2. Openness to warm communication (RD2)
  3. Attachment (RD3)
  4. Dependence (RD4)
- Persistence (PS)
  1. Eagerness of effort (PS1)
  2. Work hardened (PS2)
  3. Ambitious (PS3)
  4. Perfectionist (PS4)
- Self-directedness (SD)
  1. Responsibility (SD1)
  2. Purposeful (SD2)
  3. Resourcefulness (SD3)
  4. Self-acceptance (SD4)
  5. Enlightened second nature (SD5)
- Cooperativeness (C)
  1. Social acceptance (C1)
  2. Empathy (C2)
  3. Helpfulness (C3)
  4. Compassion (C4)
  5. Pure-hearted conscience (C5)
- Self-transcendence (ST)
  1. Self-forgetful (ST1)
  2. Transpersonal identification (ST2)
  3. Spiritual acceptance (ST3)

== Neurobiological foundation ==
TCI has been used for investigating the neurobiological foundation for personality, together with other research modalities, e.g., with molecular neuroimaging, structural neuroimaging and genetics.

Temperament	Neurotransmitter system
Novelty seeking	Low dopaminergic activity
Harm avoidance	High serotonergic activity
Reward dependence	Low noradrenergic activity

Cloninger suggested that the three original temperaments from TPQ, novelty seeking, harm avoidance, and reward dependence, was correlated with low basal dopaminergic activity, high serotonergic activity, and low basal noradrenergic activity, respectively.

Many studies have used TCI for examining whether genetic variants in individual genes have an association with personality traits. Studies suggest that novelty seeking is associated with dopaminergic pathways. Dopamine transporter DAT1 and dopamine receptor DRD4 are associated with novelty seeking. Parkinson's patients, who are intrinsically low in dopamine, are found to have low novelty seeking scores. Gene variants that have been investigated are, e.g., 5-HTTLPR in the serotonin transporter gene and gene variants in XBP1.

== Relationship to other personality models ==
Cloninger argued that the Five Factor model does not assess domains of personality relevant to personality disorders such as autonomy, moral values, and aspects of maturity and self-actualization considered in humanistic and transpersonal psychology. Cloninger argued that these domains are captured by self-directedness, cooperativeness, and self-transcendence respectively. He also argued that personality factors defined as independent by factor analysis, such as neuroticism and introversion, may actually share underlying etiological factors.

Research has found that all of the TCI dimensions are each related substantially to at least one of the dimensions in the Five Factor Model, Eysenck's model, Zuckerman's alternative five:

- Harm avoidance is strongly positively associated with neuroticism and inversely associated with extraversion.
- Novelty seeking is most strongly associated with extraversion, although it also has a moderate positive association with openness to experience and a moderate negative association with conscientiousness.
- Persistence has a positive association with conscientiousness.
- Reward dependence is most strongly associated with extraversion, although it also has a moderate positive association with openness to experience.
- Cooperativeness is most strongly associated with agreeableness.
- Self-directedness has a strong negative association with neuroticism and a positive association with conscientiousness.
- Self-transcendence had a positive association with openness to experience and to a lesser extent extraversion.
- Relationships have also been found between the TCI dimensions and traits specific to the models of Zuckerman and Eysenck respectively.
- Novelty seeking is related to Impulsive sensation seeking in Zuckerman's alternative five model and to psychoticism in Eysenck's model.
- Zuckerman and Cloninger have contended that Harm Avoidance is a composite dimension comprising neurotic introversion at one end and stable extraversion at the other end.
- Persistence is related to Zuckerman's Activity scale and inversely to psychoticism.
- Cooperativeness is inversely related to Zuckerman's Aggression-hostility scale and to psychoticism.
- Self-transcendence has no equivalent in either Zuckerman or Eysenck's model as neither model recognises openness to experience.

== Health and well-being ==
Cloninger has argued that "psychological well-being" depends on the development of facets of the three character dimensions, such as autonomy and life purpose from self-directedness, positive relations with others from cooperativeness, and personal growth and self-actualization from self-transcendence. He has also argued that the temperament dimensions are associated with subjective well-being and to some extent with physical health. A study examining relationships between character dimensions and aspects of health and happiness found that self-directedness was strongly associated with happiness, satisfaction with life, general health, and perceived social support. Cooperativeness was associated most strongly with perceived social support and only weakly with the other well-being measures. Self-transcendence was associated with positive emotions when taking the other character traits into account, but was largely unrelated to negative emotions or the other well-being measures.

== See also ==
- Karolinska Scales of Personality
- NEO PI-R
