= Novelty seeking =

Personality trait

In psychology, novelty seeking (NS) is a personality trait associated with exploratory activity in response to novel stimulation, impulsive decision making, extravagance in approach to reward cues, quick loss of temper, and avoidance of frustration. That is, novelty seeking (or sensation seeking) refers to the tendency to pursue new experiences with intense emotional sensations. It is a multifaceted behavioral construct that includes thrill seeking, novelty preference, risk taking, low harm avoidance, and reward dependence.

The novelty-seeking trait is considered a heritable tendency of individuals to take risks for the purpose of achieving stimulation and seeking new environments and situations that make their experiences more intense. The trait has been associated with the level of motive and excitement in response to novelty. Persons with high levels of novelty seeking have been described as more impulsive and disorderly than low novelty seekers and have a higher propensity to get involved in risky activities, such as starting to misuse drugs, engaging in risky sexual activities, and suffering accidental injuries.

It is measured in the Tridimensional Personality Questionnaire and the Temperament and Character Inventory, a later version, and is considered one of the temperament dimensions of personality. Like the other temperament dimensions, it has been found to be highly heritable. The related variety seeking, or variety-seeking buying behavior, describes consumers' desire to search for alternative products even if they are satisfied with a current product. For example, someone may drink tea with lunch one day but choose orange juice the next day specifically to get something different. High NS has been suggested to be related to low dopaminergic activity.

In the revised version of the Temperament and Character Inventory (TCI-R) novelty seeking consists of the following four subscales:

1. Exploratory excitability (NS1)
2. Impulsiveness (NS2)
3. Extravagance (NS3)
4. Disorderliness (NS4)

== Relationship to other personality traits ==
A research study found that novelty seeking had inverse relationships with other dimensions of the Temperament and Character Inventory, particularly harm avoidance and to a more moderate extent self-directedness and self-transcendence. Novelty seeking is positively associated with the five factor model trait of extraversion and to a lesser extent openness to experience and is inversely associated with conscientiousness. Novelty seeking is positively related to impulsive sensation seeking from Marvin Zuckerman's alternative five model of personality and with psychoticism in Hans J. Eysenck's model.

When novelty seeking is defined as a decision process (i.e. in terms of the tradeoff between foregoing a familiar choice option in favor of deciding to explore a novel choice option), dopamine is directly shown to increase novelty-seeking behavior. Specifically, blockade of the dopamine transporter, causing a rise in extracellular dopamine levels, increases the propensity of monkeys to select novel over familiar choice options.

== Causes ==
=== Genetics ===
Although the exact causes for novelty-seeking behaviors is unknown, there may be a link to genetics. Studies have found an area on the Dopamine receptor D4 gene on chromosome 11 that is characterized by several repeats in a particular base sequence. Multiple studies have identified a link to genetics, particularly that was one conducted by Dr. Benjamin and colleagues in which individuals who had longer alleles of this gene had higher novelty-seeking scores than individuals with the shorter allele. In another study relating to the gene and financial risk, Dr. Dreber and colleagues found a correlation between increased risk-taking and the DRD4 gene in young males.

Although studies support the link between novelty seeking and dopaminergic activity via DRD4, other studies do not exhibit a strong correlation. The importance of DRD4 in novelty seeking has yet to be confirmed conclusively.

=== Dopamine ===
In addition to potential heredity, novelty-seeking behaviors are seen with the modulation of dopamine. The overall effect of dopamine when exposed to a novel stimulus is a mass release of the neurotransmitter in reward systems of the brain including the mesolimbic pathway.

The mesolimbic pathway is active in every type of addiction and is involved with reinforcement. Because of the activation in the brain, novelty seeking has been linked to personality disorders as well as substance abuse and other addictive behaviors. DRD4 receptors are highly expressed in areas of the limbic system, which is associated with emotion and cognition. Single-nucleotide polymorphisms such as rs4680 have also been examined within this realm of study.

=== Age ===
Age is an important factor with novelty seeking. The behavior will decrease with time, especially as the brains of adolescents and young adults finalize their development. Possible factors of variation include gender, ethnicity, temperament, and environment.

== See also ==
- Adrenaline junkie
- Attention-deficit hyperactivity disorder
- Low arousal theory
- Neophilia
- Novelty bias
- Openness to experience
- Sensation Seeking Scale
