= Tridimensional Personality Questionnaire =

Personality test

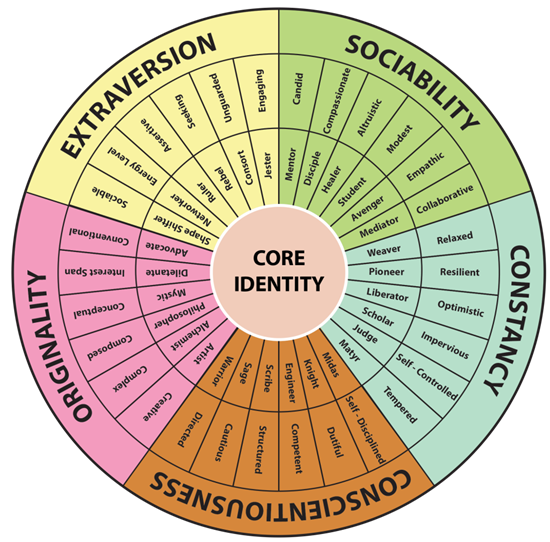

Tridimensional Personality Questionnaire (TPQ) is a personality test. It was devised by C. Robert Cloninger. A newer version of the questionnaire is called Temperament and Character Inventory.

As the name indicates TPQ seeks to measure three dimensions (traits) of the personality. These personality traits are novelty seeking, harm avoidance and reward dependence. Each have four subscales. There are 100 true-false questions which form the basis for the computation of the traits.

The personality test also exists in Chinese, French and German versions.

== Neurobiology ==
Temperament	Neurotransmitter system
Novelty seeking	Low dopaminergic activity
Harm avoidance	High serotonergic activity
Reward dependence	Low noradrenergic activity

Cloninger suggested that the three dimensions, novelty seeking, harm avoidance, and reward dependence, were correlated with low basal dopaminergic activity, high serotonergic activity, and low basal noradrenergic activity, respectively. Much research has gone into examining these links, e.g., with personality genetics.
