= Robert R. McCrae =

American personality psychologist

Robert Roger McCrae (born April 28, 1949) is a personality psychologist. He earned his Ph.D. in 1976, and worked at the National Institute of Aging. He is associated with the Five Factor Theory of personality. He has spent his career studying the stability of personality across age and culture. Along with Paul Costa, he is a co-author of the Revised NEO Personality Inventory. He has served on the editorial boards of many scholarly journals, including the Journal of Personality and Social Psychology, the Journal of Research in Personality, the Journal of Cross-Cultural Psychology, and the Journal of Individual Differences.

McCrae was born in Maryville, Missouri, on April 28, 1949. He is the youngest of three children of Andrew McCrae and Eloise Elaine McCrae.

The Five Factor Theory takes a biological view of personality. It states “Personality traits are construed as basic tendencies that are rooted in biology and that interact with external influences, including culture, in shaping the skills, habits, tastes, and values of the individual”. McCrae believes that personality is an endogenous (such as biological) trait, first and foremost.

Through his research he found that around the age of 30, neuroticism and extraversion begin to decline, while agreeableness and conscientiousness increase with age. Openness to experience, however, seems to follow a curved shape, peaking around the age of 19. These results, however, apply to people as a whole, this does not apply specifically to each individual. The group as a whole tends to change in these ways throughout the lifetime.

As he studied personality trends and stability in cultures, McCrae found that countries high in neuroticism and low in agreeableness form dimensions of uncertainty avoidance. Countries that are low in extraversion and high in conscientiousness tend to be high in power distance. Cultures high in extraversion predict a high rate of individualism. And, high levels of neuroticism and openness to experience indicate dimensions of masculinity within the culture.
