= Lisa Gennetian =

American economist

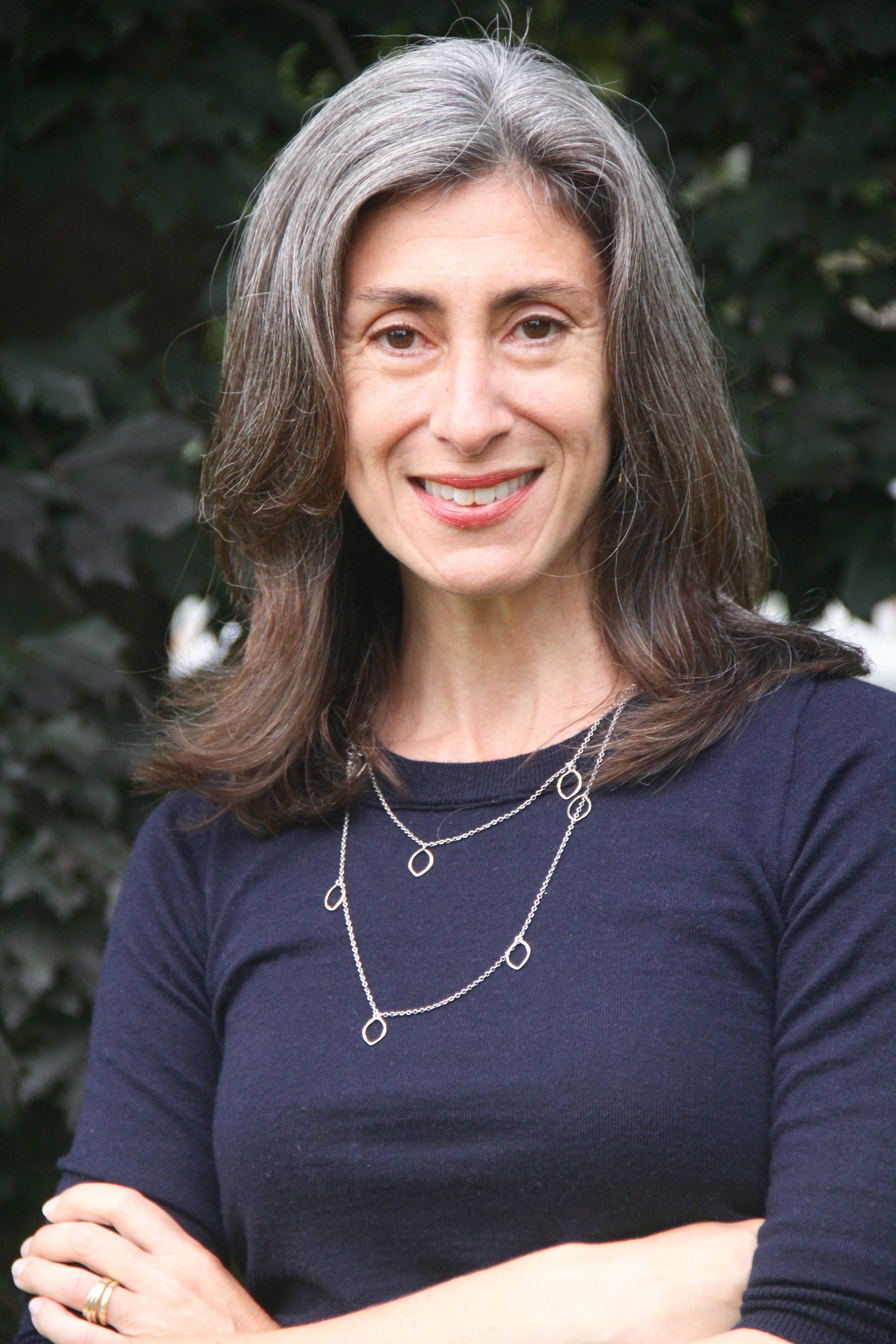
Lisa A. Gennetian, Pritzker Professor of Early Learning Policy Studies at Duke University's Sanford School of Public Policy

Lisa A. Gennetian (born 1968) is an American applied economist focused on behavioral economics, child development, specifically child poverty, parent engagement and decision making, and policy and social investment considerations. She is the Pritzker Professor of Early Learning Policy Studies at Duke University's Sanford School of Public Policy. Gennetian is associated with the Duke University Center for Child and Family Policy, Duke University's Population Research Institute (DuPRI), the Abdul Latif Jameel Poverty Action Lab and the National Bureau of Economic Research, Children's Program. She has served on the editorial board of the Child Development journal.

== Education and career ==
Gennetian received her Bachelor of Arts degree from Wellesley College in 1990 and a PhD in economics from Cornell University in 1998, with specialties in economics of the household and labor and public economics. As an applied economist, Gennetian works on child poverty and identifying the causal mechanisms underlying how child poverty shapes development. Her interdisciplinary research draws on the fields of economics, psychology, family science, and child development.

She utilizes randomized control methods to research U.S. social policies regarding poverty in the United States. Her research is published in general science journals as well as academic journals in economics, child development, psychology, public policy, and sociology. As of 2024, her 42 peer-reviewed articles had been cited in over 9,622 peer-reviewed articles.

== Notable Studies ==
Gennetian is a core principal investigator on the a multi-site longitudinal randomized control study of a monthly unconditional cash transfer program in the U.S. called Baby's First Years. It assesses the impact of poverty reduction on family life and infant and toddlers' cognitive, emotional, and brain development.

Gennetian's early work included evaluations and methodological innovations in understanding causal impacts on children and families of the 1990s welfare reform experiments. She has co-led studies on the long-term impact of the Moving to Opportunity housing voucher experiment on families and children. Gennetian has published on housing and neighborhood effects on health including obesity and diabetes, teen pregnancy and teen mental health.

Gennetian also conducts research focused on Latino families and children, poverty and economic self-sufficiency, and uptake and experiences with social policies. Since 2012, she has served as a co-primary investigator or co-primary investigator of studies on poverty and economic self-sufficiency at the National Center for Research on Hispanic Families and Children.
