= The community Zabej =

The community Zabej Сообщество Забей
- Leader: Mr.Zabej
- Founded: June 17, 2006
- Headquarters: Minsk, Belarus
- Ideology: Social sphere Experimental projects Social progressivism
- Slogan: Look! Think! Act!

Website
- www.zabej.info

The community Zabej (possible modifications are Zabej!, Zabej, «Zabej!» and ZABEJ), also known as Zabej-group and Zabej-community, is an independent youth movement that was founded in the Republic of Belarus in the middle of 2006 as an alternative (non-state and non-commercial) platform for civil and political activists.

== Origins ==
In 2005, the civil initiative "Chas" ceased functioning and, in the summer of 2006, the members of the Chas movement reassembled under the new name "«Zabej!»"; nearly all of the original membership continued under the new community formation. The launch of «Zabej!» was marked with a yard football tournament; this was later followed by a magazine named Zabej!Info and a number of projects: "Poshuk", "Hapun", "Kinobunker" and "We - to children".

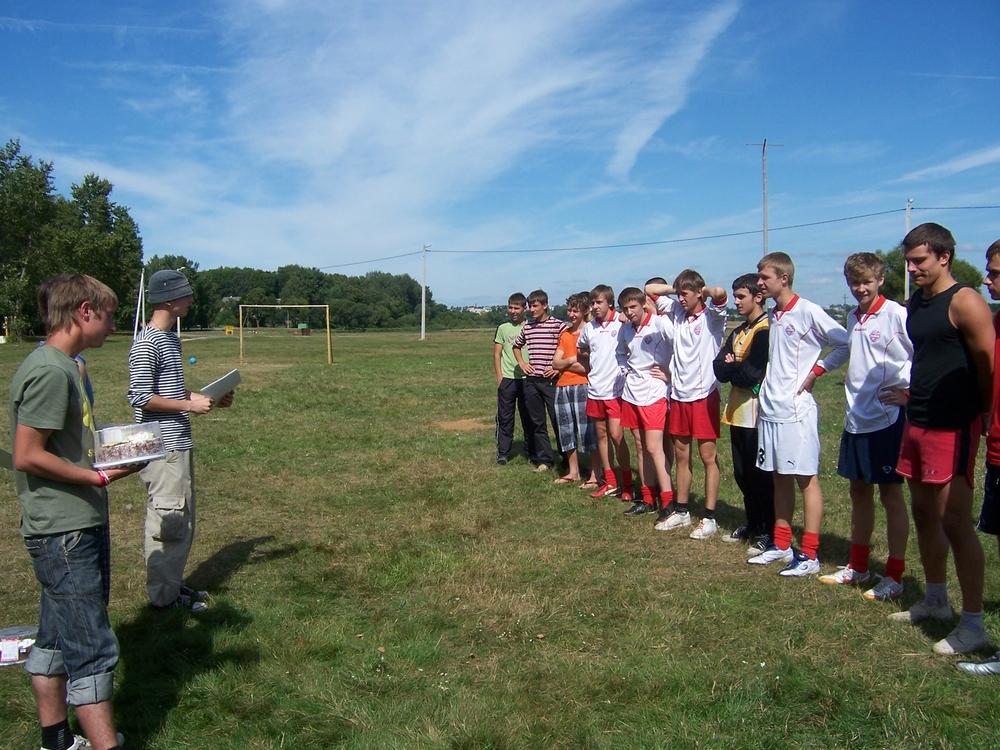
Yard football tournament, Vilejka, 2009

== Nomenclature ==
According to the community's participants, the name reflects the degree of civil and political activity of young people in Belarus. "Zabit" is a slang word that means to "brush aside", "to shut one's eyes", “to stop thinking about an issue” or "to neglect everything, when everything has already been neglected"—the name represents the ironic attitude of the participants to a societal indifference that they perceive. It is possible to "zabit” on something that is old, senile and cannot be repaired; however, it is also possible to "zabit" a significant historical event.

== Purpose and principles ==
The community's main aim is the creation of new rules, new values and the realisation of a new type of society, while a significant goal is the formation of a new country. The community's tasks involve the destruction of an old societal structure that is perceived as incapable and defined by a clan nature and favouritism, in addition to facilitating a new type of social and political development.

Zabej has retained the main principles of Chas: activity, solidarity, criticality, alternative culture, persistence and direct action. Religion is not influential in the community, and Zabej endeavours to appraise itself and others by actions.

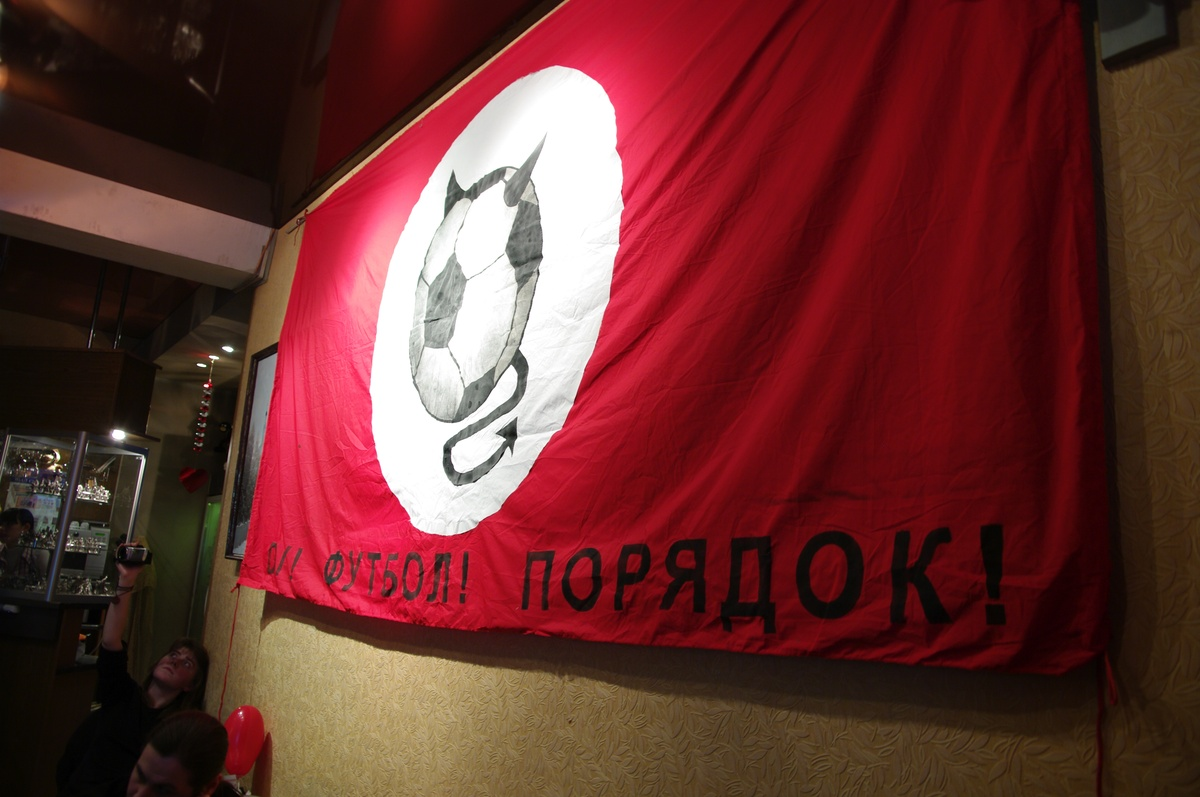
Zabej's banner

=== Slogans ===
- "Zabej at all!": this slogan reflects a condition of a modern Belarusian society, whereby the passivity of social surroundings is mocked—especially in relation to the response of the country youth to events.
- "DIY! Football! Order!" (or, "DIY!Football! Self-organization!"): the slogan expresses the positive actions of the community that aim to create a new societal order through activity, such as independent publication, football and film viewings.
- "Look! Think! Act!": the slogan of "Kinobunker" reflects an active approach to the viewing of video material, such as films and reports.
- "We will return football to the streets!": emphasises the importance of the "streets" (public space) to the community, where it is possible to participate simply in a free form of football that is without bureaucratic and financial barriers.

== The principal areas of activity ==
=== Football ===
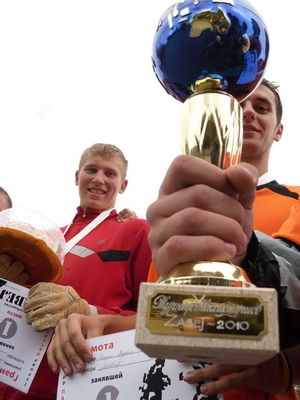
Zabej \passionaries tournament 2010

Yard football (17 June 2006 is considered to be a birthday of the community)—in 2007, the location of the tournament remains the same as previous years, but the quantity of teams increases. In 2008, the tournament extends into the country's regional areas, and selections take place in Grodno and Gomel.

The typical participants of the Zabej yard tournament are young people, from 16 to 23 years of age. Information about the tournament is available from publicly displayed posters, a website and social networks. The tournament's games are held over one to two days and 100 to 150 teams participate during the season; nearly 1500 matches are typically played.

In 2007, a female yard football tournament commenced and a yard tournament was held in eight Belarus cities in 2009.

==== Zabej Passionaries’ Tournament 2010 ====
In 2010, the community's tournament was renamed the "Passionaries’ Tournament" and was held in four cities of Belarus—the name originates from the concept of "passionarity" (the theory of Soviet historian, ethnologist and anthropologist Lev Gumilev). The main aim of the event is "active leisure", and the message that is conveyed to each participant is that any history consists of heroes and their acts. Each round of the tournament was devoted to historical characters, such as Konstanty Kalinowski, Grandfather Talash, Emilia Plater, Felix Dzerzhinsky, Konstanty Ostrogski and Vytautas the Great. Thus, an intellectual component is incorporated into yard football, and connection is made between sport and history. The Zabej Passionaries’ Tournament of 2011 covered eight cities of the Republic: Minsk, Mogilev, Bobruisk, Baranovichi, Borisov, Molodechno, Brest, Vitebsk.

==== Neformals' tournament ====
In 2010, a new yard football project was started: the "Tournament of Neformals". The purpose of the new project was to popularise street football and informal movements through an integration of various independent bodies, amateur championships, tournaments and leagues into a one-day competition. To achieve its purpose, the project brought together ten teams from five various Minsk championships. In 2011, the number of teams increased to 29 and these were taken from ten tournaments located in 12 regions of the country. The tournament also provides an opportunity for organisers and amateur teams to socialise, as well as to share the experiences gained from the organisation of local actions. The tournament is not influenced by any age restrictions or capital investments, and aims to reveal the basic needs of participants and the issue of informal sport in Belarus. Since inception, the community not only organises the tournament, but also participates in other open sporting events.

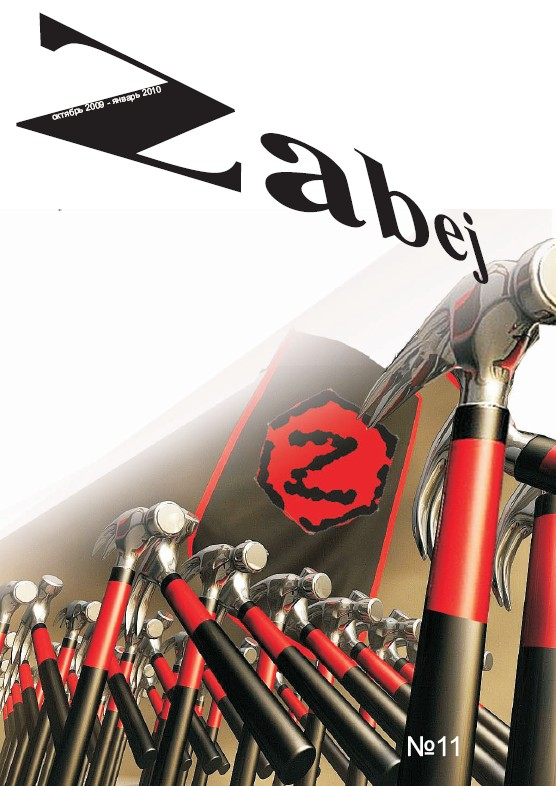
The Cover of 11th issue of Zabej!nfo

=== Magazine ===
In mid-2007, Zabej commenced a new direction with its media activity with the launch of the magazine Zabej!Info. The magazine is published bi-monthly in paper, Portable Document Format (PDF), audio and video versions. Initially, the magazine was a source of information for yard tournament participants and also covered other community projects. The range of topics that the magazine covers has extended over time, with the cultural, historical, political and economic matters of Belarus and other countries included. The magazine's target audience is passionate, socially and politically active young people.

At the beginning of 2010, 11 editions had been produced, with the twelfth edition of Zabej!Info published in May 2011 (the edition is devoted to the Passionaries' Tournament). Moreover, the magazine provided a forum for Belarus' most significant musical acts.

=== Cinema-bunker ===
In January 2009, the community started to work on another educational community project called "Cinema-bunker". The main goal of the project is the examination of historical and political processes through cinema and media. Between 2009 and 2011, 24 film lectures were delivered on topics that ranged from modern art and social problems, to political and economic organisation in society. The typical structure of a Cinema-bunker lecture consists of an initial report on a problem, followed by a video viewing and then a discussion of the viewing.

=== Other activity ===
Other projects of the community Zabej include "Zine-meeting" (2008), "Cultural Cocktail" (2009) and "Zabej-studio", the latter of which is a constant work-in-progress. Another main direction is the development of local communities.

==== Zine-meeting ====
On 14 September 2008, the community Zabej held its first Zine-meeting; the meeting brought together editors from different magazines, samizdat magazines (zines) and newspapers to discuss problems and ways to develop the local mass media in Belarus. The editorial staff of Zabej! Info also actively participates in other actions that are organised by subcultural movements that are also offered wide coverage through the publication.

==== Cultural Cocktail ====
The purpose of the Cultural Cocktail project is to create a new understanding of working class and political art. On 3 and 5 of April 2009, the inaugural event “Cultural cocktail: Eduard Limonov vs Slavomir Adamovich" was held and explored the literary creativity and political views of the two authors.
