= Paul Costa Jr. =

American psychologist

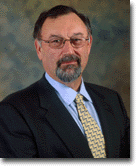
- Born: September 16, 1942 (age 83); Franklin, New Hampshire, U.S.
- Education: University of Chicago
- Known for: Research on the structure of personality
- Scientific career
- Fields: Personality Psychology
- Workplaces: NIH

Paul Costa Jr. (born September 16, 1942) is an American psychologist associated with the Five Factor Model. He earned his Ph.D. from the University of Chicago in 1970.

Author of over 300 academic articles, several books, he is perhaps best known for the Revised NEO Personality Inventory, or NEO PI-R, a psychological personality inventory; a 240-item measure of the Five Factor Model: Extraversion, Agreeableness, Conscientiousness, Neuroticism, and Openness to Experience. Additionally, the test measures six subordinate dimensions (known as 'facets') of each of the "FFM" personality factors, developed together with Robert McCrae. Work on this model has made Costa one of the most cited living psychologists, with an H index of over 135.

Alongside this inventory, he and McCrae have argued that personality is stable, especially after age 30, that it is universal (present in the same structure across ethnicities, cultures and times), that the core structure consists of five major domains, and that these in turn reflect a facet-based structure. He has argued that personality is an important influence on behavior (as opposed to situational models where individual behavior reflects no lasting individual differences), including longevity and health.
