= Self-directedness =

Adaptability of one's own behavior to achieve personally chosen goals and values

Self-directedness is a personality trait held by someone with characteristic self-determination, that is, the ability to regulate and adapt behavior to the demands of a situation in order to achieve personally chosen goals and values.

It is one of the "character" dimensions in Cloninger's Temperament and Character Inventory (TCI). Cloninger described it as "willpower"—"a metaphorical abstract concept to describe the extent to which a person identifies the imaginal self as an integrated, purposeful whole individual, rather than a disorganized set of reactive impulses." Cloninger's research found that low self-directedness is a major common feature of personality disorders generally.

Self-directedness is conceptually related to locus of control. That is, low self-directedness is associated with external locus of control, whereas high self-directedness is associated with internal locus of control.

In the five factor model of personality, self-directedness has a strong inverse association with neuroticism and a strong positive association with conscientiousness.

== Components ==
In the Temperament and Character Inventory, self-directedness consists of five subscales:

Responsibility vs. Blaming (SD1)
Cloninger compared this to Rotter's concept of locus of control. People with an internal locus of control tend to take responsibility for their actions and are resourceful in solving problems. People with an external locus of control tend to be apathetic and to blame others or bad luck for their problems.

Purposefulness vs. Lack of Goal Direction (SD2)
Cloninger noted that Viktor Frankl believed that meaningful purpose is a key source of motivation for mature adults and that fulfillment of meaning was more important than gratifying impulses.

Resourcefulness vs. Inertia (SD3)
Cloninger related this to Bandura’s concept of self-efficacy: beliefs about one’s ability to succeed in goal-directed behaviour.

Self-Acceptance vs. Self-Striving (SD4)
Cloninger argued that self-esteem and realistic acceptance of one’s limitations are important to mature development of self-directed behaviour. On the other hand, childish fantasies of unlimited ability and immortality are generally associated with poor adjustment and inferiority feelings.

Congruent Second Nature vs. Incongruent Habits (SD5)
This relates to a belief associated with Yoga that long-term cultivation of clear goals and values transforms effortful behaviour into “second nature” so that a person automatically acts in ways aligned with their deeper goals and values.

== Psychopathology ==
Researchers have suggested that a combination of low self-directedness and low cooperativeness form a general factor common to all personality disorders. Low self-directedness appears to be the most important predictor, among the TCI traits, of having a personality disorder.

Low self-directedness tends to be associated with more distressed mood, particularly depression. Research has found that non-responders to antidepressant medication scored lower in self-directedness compared to those who did respond, both before and after treatment, whereas responders had scored normally on self-directedness after treatment.

The specific combination of low self-directedness, low cooperativeness, and high self-transcendence has been described as a "schizotypal personality" style by Cloninger and colleagues, and has been found to be associated with high levels of schizotypy (proneness to psychotic symptoms). Low self-directedness has also been related to higher levels of hypnotic susceptibility, and the latter has also been linked to aspects of schizotypy.

== See also ==
- Critical thinking
