= Social investment theory =

Psychological theory

Social investment theory is a psychological theory that claims that changes in personality traits over time are driven by changes in persons' commitments to social roles and institutions. For instance, young adults may undertake efforts to be "more socially dominant, agreeable, conscientious, and less neurotic" in order to establish their careers or families; in so far as society rewards these efforts, the related personality traits are reinforced.

Since the late 1990s, there has been substantial scientific evidence that personality traits continue to change after childhood, especially during young adulthood. Generally, personality traits converge towards more agreeableness, conscientiousness, and emotional stability. Several theories – social investment theory, Five Factor Theory, etc. – have emerged to explain these changes. Social investment theory argues that such changes in personality traits is due to the establishment of individuals' own social lives into which they invest (social investment principle). This perspective assumes the development of identities through psychological commitments to social institutions in the form of social roles, which offer rewards (and foster expectations of rewards) for displaying "adult" personality traits, which - through reinforcement - promote durable changes in personality traits. Since the emergence of social investment theory, it has received support through cross-cultural studies and studies of first long-term romantic relationships, although e.g. studies on parenthood have rejected it.

== Sources ==
- Roberts, Brent W.; Wood, Dustin; Smith, Jennifer L. (2005). "Evaluating Five Factor Theory and social investment perspectives on personality trait development". Journal of Research in Personality. Proceedings of the Association for Research in Personality. 39 (1): 166–184. doi:10.1016/j.jrp.2004.08.002. ISSN 0092-6566.
