= Rule consciousness =

Personality factor

Rule consciousness is one of the primary factors of personality out of sixteen, as categorized by Raymond Cattell in 1946 as low- and high-level. The descriptors of low-level rule consciousness are expedient, nonconforming, disregards rules, self-indulgent or having a low super ego strength while the high-level consciousness descriptors are rule-conscious, dutiful, conscientious, conforming, moralistic, staid, rule-bound or having high super ego strength.

A theory also associates rule consciousness as the "original apperception", which is a Kantian concept of a mental state in which we perceive special kinds of non-spatial inner objects. Jean Piaget also studied rule consciousness between boys and girls in the context of games.
