= Eysenck Personality Questionnaire =

Psychological questionnaire

In psychology, the Eysenck Personality Questionnaire (EPQ) is a questionnaire to assess the personality traits of a person. It was devised by psychologists Hans Jürgen Eysenck and Sybil B. G. Eysenck.

Hans Eysenck's theory is based primarily on physiology and genetics. Although he was a behaviorist who considered learned habits of great importance, he believed that personality differences are determined by genetic inheritance. He is, therefore, primarily interested in temperament. In devising a temperament-based theory, Eysenck did not exclude the possibility that some aspects of personality are learned, but left the consideration of these to other researchers.

== Dimensions ==
Eysenck initially conceptualized personality as two biologically based independent dimensions of temperament, E and N, measured on a continuum, but then extending this to include a third, P.

E – Extraversion/Introversion: Extraversion is characterized by being outgoing, talkative, high on positive affect (feeling good), and in need of external stimulation. According to Eysenck's arousal theory of extraversion, there is an optimal level of cortical arousal, and performance deteriorates as one becomes more or less aroused than this optimal level. Arousal can be measured by skin conductance, brain waves or sweating. At very low and very high levels of arousal, performance is low, but at a better mid-level of arousal, performance is maximized. Extraverts, according to Eysenck's theory, are chronically under-aroused and bored and are therefore in need of external stimulation to bring them UP to an optimal level of performance. About 16 percent of the population tend to fall in this range. Introverts, on the other hand, (also about 16 percent of the population) are chronically over-aroused and jittery and are therefore in need of peace and quietness to bring them DOWN to an optimal level of performance. Most people (about 68 percent of the population) fall in the midrange of the extraversion/introversion continuum, an area referred to as ambiversion.

N – Neuroticism/Stability: Neuroticism or emotionality is characterized by high levels of negative affect such as depression and anxiety. Neuroticism, according to Eysenck's theory, is based on activation thresholds in the sympathetic nervous system or visceral brain. This is the part of the brain that is responsible for the fight-or-flight response in the face of danger. Activation can be measured by heart rate, blood pressure, cold hands, sweating and muscular tension (especially in the forehead). Neurotic people — who have low activation thresholds, and unable to inhibit or control their emotional reactions, experience negative affect (fight-or-flight) in the face of very minor stressors — are easily nervous or upset. Emotionally stable people — who have high activation thresholds and good emotional control, experience negative affect only in the face of very major stressors — are calm and collected under pressure.

The two dimensions or axes, extraversion-introversion and emotional stability-instability, define four quadrants. These are made up of:

- Stable extraverts (sanguine qualities such as outgoing, talkative, responsive, easygoing, lively, carefree, leadership)
- Unstable extraverts (choleric qualities such as touchy, restless, excitable, changeable, impulsive, irresponsible)
- Stable introverts (phlegmatic qualities such as calm, even-tempered, reliable, controlled, peaceful, thoughtful, careful, passive)
- Unstable introverts (melancholic qualities such as quiet, reserved, pessimistic, sober, rigid, anxious, moody)

Further research demonstrated the need for a third category of temperament:

P – Psychoticism/Socialisation: Psychoticism is associated not only with the liability to have a psychotic episode (or break with reality), but also with aggression. Psychotic behavior is rooted in the characteristics of toughmindedness, non-conformity, inconsideration, recklessness, hostility, anger and impulsiveness. The physiological basis suggested by Eysenck for psychoticism is testosterone, with higher levels of psychoticism associated with higher levels of testosterone.

The following table describes the traits that are associated with the three dimensions in Eysenck's model of personality:

Psychoticism	Extraversion	Neuroticism
Aggressive	Sociable	Anxious
Assertive	Irresponsible	Depressed
Egocentric	Dominant	Guilt Feelings
Unsympathetic	Lack of reflection	Low self-esteem
Manipulative	Sensation-seeking	Tense
Achievement-oriented	Impulsive	Moody
Dogmatic	Risk-taking	Hypochondriac
Masculine	Expressive	Lack of autonomy
Tough-minded	Active	Obsessive

L – Lie/Social Desirability: Although the first 3 scales were predicated upon a biologically based theory of personality, the fourth scale has not been theoretically specified to the same extent, but it was considered to be conceptually strong to the extent that it would demonstrate the same degree of measurement similarity across cultures.

== Versions ==
EPQ also exists in Finnish and Turkish versions.

In 1985 a revised version of EPQ was described—the EPQ-R—with a publication in the journal Personality and Individual Differences. This version has 100 yes/no questions in its full version and 48 yes/no questions in its short scale version. A different approach to personality measurement developed by Eysenck, which distinguishes between different facets of these traits, is the Eysenck Personality Profiler.

== See also ==
- Revised NEO Personality Inventory
- Temperament and Character Inventory
