= C. Robert Cloninger =

American psychiatrist and geneticist

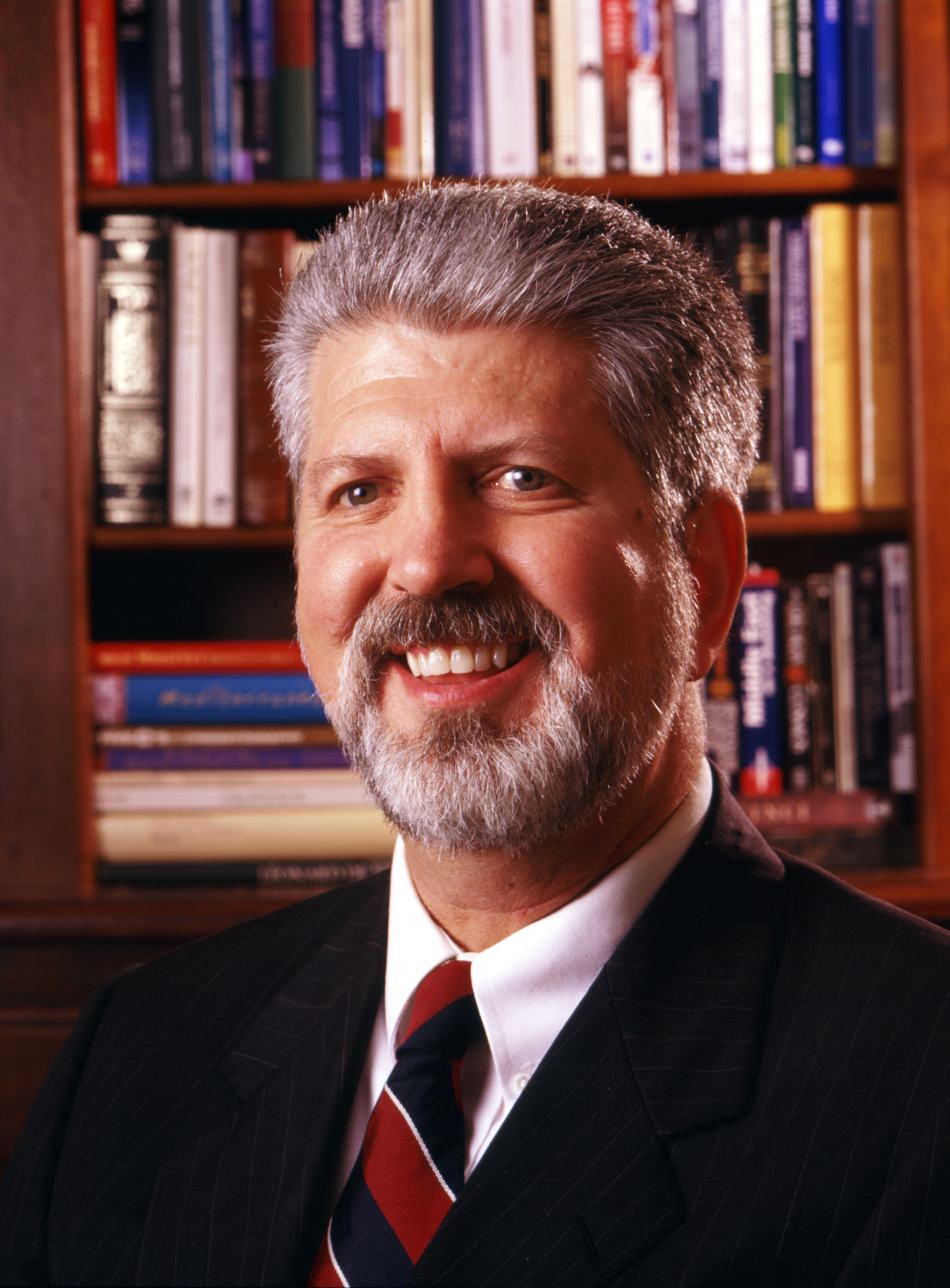
- Born: April 4, 1944 (age 82); Beaumont, Texas
- Known for: Genetics of alcoholism Psychobiology of personality Science of well-being
- Scientific career
- Fields: Psychology; Psychiatry; Genetics
- Workplaces: Washington University in St. Louis

Claude Robert Cloninger (born April 4, 1944) is an American psychiatrist and geneticist noted for his research on the biological, psychological, social, and spiritual foundation of both mental health and mental illness. He previously held the Wallace Renard Professorship of Psychiatry, and served as professor of psychology and genetics, as well as director of the Sansone Family Center for Well-Being at Washington University in St. Louis. Cloninger is a member of the evolutionary, neuroscience, and statistical genetics programs of the Division of Biology and Biomedical Sciences at Washington University, and is recognized as an expert clinician in the treatment of general psychopathology, substance dependence, and personality disorders. Dr. Cloninger is currently professor emeritus .

Cloninger is known for his research on the genetics, neurobiology, and development of personality and personality disorders. He identified and described heritable personality traits predictive of vulnerability to alcoholism and other mental disorders in prospective studies of adoptees reared apart from their biological parents. Cloninger also carried out the first genome-wide association and linkage study of normal personality traits, and has developed two widely used tools for measuring personality: the Tridimensional Personality Questionnaire (TPQ) and the Temperament and Character Inventory (TCI).

In 2004, he published Feeling Good: The Science of Well-Being. Cloninger serves as director of the Anthropedia Institute, the research branch of the Anthropedia Foundation. In collaboration with Anthropedia, he helped develop the Know Yourself DVD series.

Cloninger has earned lifetime achievement awards from many academic and medical associations, and is a member of the Institute of Medicine of the National Academy of Sciences. He has authored or co-authored nine books and more than four hundred and fifty articles, and is a highly cited psychiatrist and psychologist recognized by the Institute for Scientific Information (ISI). He has served in an editorial capacity on many journals, including Behavior Genetics, American Journal of Human Genetics, Archives of General Psychiatry, Comprehensive Psychiatry, and the Mens Sana Monographs.

== Education and early research ==
Cloninger was born in Beaumont, Texas in 1944. His father Morris Cloninger was a former English teacher and businessman, and his mother Concetta was a former actress who directed the local community theater. He attended the University of Texas in Austin from 1962 to 1966 in the Plan II Honors program. In addition to pre-medical studies, he studied philosophy, cultural anthropology, and psychology for which he received honors.

Cloninger attended a research-intensive medical school at Washington University in St. Louis from 1966 to 1970, and has remained on the faculty there throughout his career. In addition to regular medical training, he did a research fellowship in preventive medicine and public health. He began research in psychiatry in 1969 under the guidance of Samuel Guze. Cloninger wanted to understand why antisocial personality disorder, substance dependence, and somatization disorder were so often found together in the same individual and in the same family. This question led to longitudinal studies of people with each of these disorders and then family and adoption studies.

In order to better quantify and test hypotheses about the inheritance of psychiatric disorders, he studied quantitative genetics with Theodore Reich in St. Louis and with Newton Morton and D.C. Rao of the Population Genetics Lab of the University of Hawaii. During the late 70s, Cloninger worked on modeling complex patterns of inheritance using path analysis to allow for both genetic and cultural inheritance. He extended path analysis with the introduction of the "copath" to facilitate the analysis of assortative mating and cultural inheritance. He worked to develop methods for disentangling genetic, cultural, and other environmental influences on mental disorders until he concluded that such statistical modeling would never convince skeptics or provide precise estimates when biological parents also reared their own children. His clinical studies of psychiatric disorders also revealed much complexity in the clinical features of mental disorders: people often had multiple overlapping syndromes and changed over time in unpredictable ways. As a result, he shifted his efforts after 1980 to more compelling experimental designs, such as adoption and linkage studies.

== Work ==
=== Stockholm adoption study ===
The answer to the need for better data about separation experiments came in the form of a long-term collaboration between Cloninger and Michael Bohman, the head of child psychiatry at the University of Umea in Sweden. Bohman had read some of Cloninger's papers on the analysis of separation experiments and asked for Cloninger's assistance in his own research. For several years, Bohman had been studying the behavior of a large birth cohort of children born in Stockholm. The children had been separated from their biological parents at birth and reared in adopted homes. Extensive data about alcohol abuse, criminality, and physical and mental complaints to physicians were available in Sweden as a result of the extensive health and social records for all people in the country. Cloninger developed methods for what he called a "cross-fostering" analysis. Information about the genetic background of adoptees was measured by data about their biological parents. Information about their rearing environment was measured by data about their adoptive parents and home environment. This permitted study of the independent contributions of the genetic and environmental backgrounds independently and in combination in a sample of thousands of adoptees. Their first joint paper on a cross-fostering analysis of the inheritance of alcoholism in men became an ISI Science Citation Classic that convinced most scientists that vulnerability to alcoholism was genetically heritable in part.

Cloninger, Bohman, and Soren Sigvardson distinguished two subtypes of alcoholism that differed in their clinical features and pattern of inheritance: type 1, associated with anxiety proneness and loss of control over alcohol intake after age 25; and type 2, associated with impulsivity and antisocial behavior before age 25. Cloninger proposed that the differences between these two groups of people were explained by personality traits that were observable in childhood, long before any exposure to alcohol. He confirmed this by measuring the personality of boys when they were in the fourth grade, about 10 years of age, based on detailed interviews with their teachers and without any knowledge of their drinking status as adults. The personality ratings of Cloninger were based on his tridimensional model of temperament. The personality model also helped the team to understand other findings they obtained about the inheritance of criminal behavior, somatization (i.e., many physical complaints), anxiety, and depressive disorders. The original findings were later confirmed by a replication study using the same methods conducted in Gothenburg, Sweden. Overall, these adoption studies provided strong evidence for the contribution of both genetic and environmental influences on vulnerability to alcoholism, somatization, criminality, anxiety, and depressive disorders. Without this research the general public would have never known that both genetic and environmental factors play a role in these conditions.

=== Temperament and character inventory ===
Observations about personality provided Cloninger a practical way to predict vulnerability to mental disorders. In the mid-1980s, he developed a general model of temperament based on genetic, neurobiological, and neuropharmacological data, rather than using factor analysis of behavior or self-reports as has usually been done by personality psychologists. He focused on the structure of learning abilities within the person, as has long been desired by social-cognitive psychologists. To test the adequacy of his structural model, Cloninger compared his model of development within the individual (i.e., ontogeny) to the evolution of learning abilities in animal phylogeny. Initially he described three dimensions of temperament that he suggested were independently inherited: harm avoidance (anxious, pessimistic vs. outgoing, optimistic), novelty seeking (impulsive, quick-tempered vs. rigid, slow-tempered) and reward dependence (warm, approval-seeking vs. cold, aloof). These dimensions are measured by using his Tridimensional Personality Questionnaire (TPQ).

Studies quickly showed that Persistence (persevering, ambitious vs. easily discouraged, underachieving) was a fourth independently inherited temperament dimension with specific brain circuitry, rather than a facet of Reward Dependence. These temperament dimensions proved to be a powerful way to distinguish subtypes of personality disorders and vulnerability to a wide range of mental disorders. Cloninger was initially criticized for reducing personality to emotional drives. For example, in his book Listening to Prozac, Peter Kramer called the temperament model of personality "a humanist's nightmare".

Likewise, Cloninger and his colleague Dragan Svrakic found that temperament alone did not capture the full range of personality. They found that, by itself, temperament could not reveal whether a person was mature or had a personality disorder. On average, there were differences in the probability of personality disorder in people with different temperament configurations, but every configuration could be found in people who were mentally healthy as well as in people who had personality disorders. Consequently, Cloninger identified a second domain of personality variables, using character traits to measure a person's humanistic and transpersonal style: self-directedness (reliable, purposeful vs. blaming, aimless), cooperativeness (tolerant, helpful vs. prejudiced, revengeful) and self-transcendence (self-forgetful, spiritual vs. self-conscious, materialistic). These character dimensions measure the components of an individual's mental self-government and can strongly measure the presence and severity of personality disorder. Cloninger often cites Immanuel Kant, who defines character as "what people make of themselves intentionally". Character dimensions have strong relations with recently evolved regions of the brain—such as the frontal, temporal, and parietal neocortex—that regulate learning of facts and propositions. By contrast, the temperament dimensions have strong relations with the older cortico-striatal and limbic systems that regulate habits and skills.

These three character dimensions have been found to be as heritable as the four temperament dimensions, each with about 50% heritability in twin studies. All seven dimensions of temperament and character have been found to have unique genetic determinants and to be regulated by different brain systems as measured by functional brain imaging. Each dimension is influenced by complex interaction between many genetic and environmental variables, so personality develops as a complex adaptive system. Cloninger's temperament and character inventories have been extensively used in a wide variety of clinical and research purposes, and cited in thousands of peer-reviewed publications. The construction of the inventories on the basis of genetic and neurobiological considerations challenges the traditional statistical assumptions of factor analytically derived inventories, which have been targeted by social and cognitive psychologists for many years. Fortunately, in terms of overall statistical information, there is extensive overlap among the TCI and other multidimensional personality inventories, except that other inventories lack the dimension of Self-Transcendence.

=== Tobacco Testimony ===
Cloninger was an expert witness for several tobacco companies during the 1990s. He testified that, by his definition, smoking was not addictive.

=== Self-transcendence ===
Self-transcendence refers to the interest people have in searching for something elevated, something beyond their individual existence. According to Cloninger's model, self-transcendence can manifest as an intuitive understanding of elevated aspects of humanity, like compassion, ethics, art, and culture. Others who experience it may also describe an awareness of a divine presence. People scoring high in TCI Self-Transcendence report frequent experiences of boundlessness and inseparability. They lose awareness of their separateness when absorbed in what they love to do or when appreciating the wonders and mysteries of life. Cloninger observes that such experiences of self-forgetfulness and transpersonal identification correspond to what Freud called "oceanic feelings", which is different from intellectual adherence to particular religious dogmas or rituals. The TCI Self-Transcendence scale is often used as a measure of spirituality. Cloninger proposed that the psyche is the aspect of a human being that motivates the search for self-transcendence and underlies the human capacities for self-awareness, creativity, and freedom of will. As suggested by transpersonal psychologists and other psychiatrists like Carl Jung and Viktor Frankl, Cloninger has emphasized that self-transcendence is an essential component in the processes of integration and maturation of personality. He found that when people who score high on all three character traits are compared to others, they have the highest level of well-being, as measured by presence of positive emotions, absence of negative emotions, satisfaction with life, or virtuous conduct. The capacity for love and work have long been recognized as important for well-being, but Cloninger also observed that people need to experience self-transcendence in order to cope well with suffering and to enjoy life's wonders and mysteries fully.

=== The Science of Well-Being ===
In his book Feeling Good: The Science of Well-Being, Cloninger describes the impetus for his new work:

I think it is important that we bring a scientific basis to psychiatry and psychology at a level that goes beyond the level of description. In order for us to advance systematically, as for instance chemistry and physics have done, we need a specific theory of the person and our nature of being. As a result of that I have tried to work out such a systematic model, and have progressed by stages to more and more inclusive theoretical frameworks. The basic position I have now is that we have to see the whole person as more than a collection of disease states: a person is composed of multiple elements of body, mind, and spirit. Each of these has to be carefully defined and measurable, so that we can avoid fantasy and speculation and have testable models. ... What has become increasingly clear to me is that man has a natural integrative tendency that leads to health, and that disease emerges whenever there is a block. Blocks can come from a genetic predisposition that interferes with natural development, from social learning, or from prior experiences that are unique to the individual.

Cloninger has also suggested that not only is there a natural integrative tendency, but that "all human beings have spontaneous needs for happiness, self-understanding and love." He describes practices that improve character development and satisfy these strong basic needs. Just as people can become stronger in the body through physical exercise, he has found they can become mentally and spiritually healthier with mental and spiritual exercises, including certain meditations that enhance mindfulness and spirituality. He describes examples of such exercises in detail in a DVD series called Know Yourself, which was developed with the Anthropedia Foundation. The Know Yourself series is intended for use as well-being coaching or as an adjunct in psychotherapy.

The mental exercises described by Cloninger are intended to stimulate character development and self-awareness, thereby fostering a healthy way of living with three sets of goals and values:

Working in the service of others, thereby increasing love and cooperativeness; letting go of fighting and worrying, thereby increasing hope and self-directedness; and growing in awareness, thereby increasing faith and Self-Transcendence. Cloninger's approach combines principles of cognitive-behavioral therapy, person-centered therapy, and positive psychology with personality assessment and meditative practices that enhance mindfulness and self-awareness of the cognitive schemas that organize and direct our attention and motivation in different situations. His approach differs from other forms of psychotherapy by its emphasis on integration of a person's awareness of their body, thoughts, and psyche. He suggests that the separation of biomedical, psychosocial, and spiritual approaches interferes with the development of well-being, whereas their integration has been shown to reduce drop-out, relapse, and recurrence rates in randomized controlled trials of well-being therapy. Cloninger's integrative approach is intended to synthesize work done in the mental health field, fostering what Juan Mezzich of the World Psychiatric Association has called "psychiatry for the person". Several studies show that psychotherapy, alone or in combination with medications, can help people with mental disorders recover faster and stay well longer, but that a declining number of psychiatrists are providing psychotherapy to their patients. Cloninger is working with the World Psychiatric Association and the International College of Person-centered Medicine to advance a more integrated approach to mental health and well-being. The American Psychiatric Association has recognized Cloninger for his contributions to better understanding the biopsychosocial basis of mental health and illness with its 2009 Judd Marmor Award.

== Honors and awards ==
Selected honors and awards

- 2014 Oscar Pfister Award from American Psychiatric Association and Association of Professional Chaplains
- 2012 Honorary Doctor of Philosophy (PhD h.c.), Psychology and Social Sciences Faculty, University of Gothenburg, Sweden
- 2009 Judd Marmor Award, American Psychiatric Association
- 2003 Lifetime Achievement Award, International Society of Psychiatric Genetics
- 2000 Annual Award for Lifetime Achievement, American Society of Addiction Medicine
- 1993 Adolf Meyer Award, American Psychiatric Association
- 1993 Samuel Hamilton Award, American Psychopathological Association
- 1989 Institute of Medicine, National Academy of Sciences, USA
- 1988 Edward A. Strecker Award, Institute of Pennsylvania Hospital
- 1983 Honorary Doctor of Medicine (M.D. hc), University of Umea, Sweden

== Selected publications ==
=== Books ===
- Cloninger, C. R. (2004). Feeling Good: The Science of Well-Being. New York: Oxford University Press. (Italian translation with foreword by Mario Maj, Rome, CIC Edizioni Internationali, 2006).
- Hallett M., Fahn S., Jankovic J.J., Lang A.E., Cloninger C.R., Yudofsky S.C. (Eds.) (2005). Psychogenic Movement Disorders: Neurology and Neuropsychiatry. Philadelphia: Lippincott Williams & Wilkins.
- Cloninger, C. R., (Ed.) (1999). Personality and Psychopathology. Washington, D.C.: American Psychiatric Press.
- Cloninger C.R., Przybeck T.R., Svrakic D.M., Wetzel R.D., Richter J., Eisemann M., Richter G. (1999). Das Temperament und Charakter Inventar (TCI) Manual. Frankfurt: Swets Test Services.
- Gershon E.S. and Cloninger C.R. (Eds.) (1994). Genetic Approaches in Mental Disorders. Washington, D.C.: American Psychiatric Press.
- Cloninger C.R., Przybeck T.R., Svrakic D.M., Wetzel R.D. (1994). The Temperament and Character Inventory (TCI): A Guide to Its Development and Use. St. Louis: Washington University Center for Psychobiology of Personality.
- Cloninger C.R. and Begleiter H. (Eds.) (1991). Genetics and Biology of Alcoholism. Banbury Reports 33. Plainview, N.Y.: Cold Spring Harbor Laboratory Press.
- Maser J.D. and Cloninger C.R. (Eds.) (1990). Comorbidity in Anxiety and Mood Disorders. Washington, D.C., American Psychiatric Press.

=== Selected articles ===
- Cloninger, C. R. (2013) What makes people healthy, happy, and fulfilled in the face of current world challenges? Mens Sana Monographs, 11(1), 16–24.
- Cloninger, C. R., Zohar, A. H., Hirschmann, S., Dahan, D. (2012) The psychological costs and benefits of being highly persistent: personality profiles distinguish mood disorders from anxiety disorders. J Affective Disorder, 136(3), 758–66.
- Cloninger, C. R., Zohar, A. H. (2011) Personality and the perception of health and happiness. J Affective Disorders, 128(1-2), 24–32.
- Cloninger, C. R. (2009). On Well-Being: Current Research Trends And Future Directions. Editorial. Mens Sana Monographs, 6(1), 3–9.
- Sullivan, S., Cloninger, C.R., Przybeck, T.R., Klein, S. (2007). Personality characteristics in obesity and relationship with successful weight loss. Int J Obes (Lond.), 31, 667–674.
- Cloninger, C. R. (2006). The science of well-being: An integrated approach to mental health and its disorders. World Psychiatry, 5, 71–76.
- Cloninger, C. R., Svrakic, D.M., Przybeck, T.R. (2006) Can personality assessment predict future depression? A twelve-month follow-up of 631 subjects. J Affective Disorder, 92 (1), 35–44.
- Hansenne, M., Delhez, M., Cloninger, C.R. (2005). Psychometric properties of the Temperament and Character Inventory-Revised in a Belgian sample. J Person Assess, 85, 40–49.
- Grucza, R.A., Przybeck, T.R., Cloninger, C.R. (2005). Personality as a mediator of demographic risk factors for suicide attempts in a community sample. Comprehensive Psychiatry, 46, 214–222.
- Gillespie, N.A., Cloninger, C.R., Heath, A.C., Martin, N.G. (2003). The genetic and environmental relationship between Cloninger's dimensions of temperament and character. Personality and Individual Differences, 35, 1931–1946.
- Cloninger, C. R. (2003). Completing the psychobiological architecture of human personality development: Temperament, Character, & Coherence. In U. M. Staudinger & U. E. R. Lindenberger (Eds.), Understanding human development: Dialogues with lifespan psychology (pp. 159–182). Boston: Kluwer Academic Publishers.
- Cloninger, C. R. (2002). The discovery of susceptibility genes for mental disorders. Proceedings of the National Academy of Sciences USA, 99(21), 13365–13367.
- Cloninger, C. R. (2000). Biology of personality dimensions. Current Opinions in Psychiatry, 13, 611–616.
- Cloninger, C. R. (1999). A new conceptual paradigm from genetics and psychobiology for the science of mental health. Australian and New Zealand Journal of Psychiatry, 33, 174–186.
- Cloninger, C. R., Svrakic, N. M., & Svrakic, D. M. (1997). Role of personality self-organization in development of mental order and disorder. Development and Psychopathology, 9, 881–906.
- Cloninger, C. R. (1994). The genetic structure of personality and learning: a phylogenetic perspective. Clinical Genetics, 46, 124–137.
- Cloninger, C. R., Svrakic, D. M., & Przybeck, T. R. (1993). A psychobiological model of temperament and character. Archives of General Psychiatry, 50, 975–990.
- Cloninger, C. R., Przybeck, T. R., & Svrakic, D. M. (1991). The tridimensional personality questionnaire: U.S. normative data. Psychological Reports, 69, 1047–1057.

== See also ==
- Cloninger Model of Personality in Biological basis of personality
