= Openness to experience =

Personality trait

Openness to experience (also called openness/intellect) is one of the five broad domains of personality in the Five Factor Model. It describes the extent to which a person is imaginative, curious, and receptive to new ideas, feelings, and aesthetic and sensory experiences.

In the NEO model of Costa and McCrae, openness has six facets: fantasy (active imagination), aesthetics, feelings (attentiveness to inner states), actions (preference for variety), ideas (intellectual curiosity), and values (willingness to question authority and tradition). Other models divide the trait differently. The HEXACO model has four facets, and the Big Five Aspects model splits it into two aspects, intellect and openness Openness is usually measured by self-report, using either adjective lists or questionnaire statements.

Openness is roughly normally distributed, with most people scoring in the middle. People who score low are described as "closed to experience". They tend to prefer familiar routines and conventional views and have a narrower range of interests. Higher openness is moderately associated with creativity, knowledge (especially verbal knowledge), and, more weakly, intelligence. It is related to the construct of absorption and modestly to hypnotic susceptibility. In many Western samples, higher openness is associated with more liberal social and cultural attitudes.Twin studies estimate that about 40–60% of the variance in openness is heritable.

Openness has weaker links to subjective well-being than the other Big Five traits and is largely unrelated to the presence of most mental disorders as a group. Some of its facets, however, particularly unusual thinking and fantasy, are linked with schizotypy.

Openness to experience is one of the domains which are used to describe human personality in the Five Factor Model. Openness involves six facets, or dimensions: active imagination (fantasy), aesthetic sensitivity, attentiveness to inner feelings, preference for variety (adventurousness), intellectual curiosity, and challenging authority (psychological liberalism). A great deal of psychometric research has demonstrated that these facets or qualities are significantly correlated. Thus, openness can be viewed as a global personality trait consisting of a set of specific traits, habits, and tendencies that cluster together.

Openness tends to be normally distributed, with a small number of people scoring extremely high or low on the trait and most people scoring moderately. People who score low on openness are considered to be closed to experience. They tend to be conventional and traditional in their outlook and behavior. They prefer familiar routines to new experiences, and generally have a narrower range of interests.

Openness has moderate positive relationships with creativity, intelligence, and knowledge. Openness is related to the psychological trait of absorption, and like absorption has a modest relationship to individual differences in hypnotic susceptibility. Openness has more modest relationships with aspects of subjective well-being than other Five Factor Model personality traits.

On the whole, openness appears to be largely unrelated to symptoms of mental disorders.

== Measurement ==
Openness to experience is usually assessed with self-report measures, although peer-reports and third-party observation are also used. Self-report measures are either lexical or based on statements. Which measure of either type is used is determined by an assessment of psychometric properties and the time and space constraints of the research being undertaken.

- Lexical measures use individual adjectives that reflect openness to experience traits, such as creative, intellectual, artistic, philosophical, deep. L. R. Goldberg developed a 20-word measure as part of his 100-word Big Five markers. G. Saucier developed a briefer 8-word measure as part of his 40-word mini-markers. However, the psychometric properties of Saucier's original mini-markers have been found suboptimal for samples outside of North America. As a result, a systematically revised measure, the International English Mini-Markers, was developed and has proven to have good psychometric validity for assessing openness to experience and other five-factor personality model dimensions, both within and, especially, without American populations. Internal consistency reliability of the openness to experience measure is 0.84 for both native and non-native English-speakers.
- Statement measures tend to comprise more words, and hence take up more research instrument space, than lexical measures. For example, the openness (intellect) scale of Goldberg's International Personality Item Pool is 45 words, compared to Saucier or Thompson's (2008) 8-word lexical scale for Openness. Examples of statement measure items used, from the NEO PI-R, based on the Five Factor Model, and the HEXACO-PI-R based on the HEXACO model of personality, are "Love to think up new ways of doing things" and "Have difficulty understanding abstract ideas". In these tests, openness to experience is one of the five/six measured personality dimensions. In both tests openness to experience has a number of facets. The NEO PI-R assesses six facets called openness to ideas, feelings, values, fantasy, aesthetics, and actions respectively. The HEXACO-PI-R assesses four facets called inquisitiveness, creativity, aesthetic appreciation, and unconventionality.

A number of studies have found that openness to experience has two major subcomponents, one related to intellectual dispositions, the other related to the experiential aspects of openness, such as aesthetic appreciation and openness to sensory experiences. These subcomponents have been referred to as intellect and experiencing openness respectively, and have a strong positive correlation (r = .55) with each other.

According to research by Sam Gosling, it is possible to assess openness by examining people's homes and work spaces. People who are highly open to experience tend to have distinctive and unconventional decorations. They are also likely to have books on a wide variety of topics, a diverse music collection, and works of art on display.

== Psychological aspects ==
Openness to experience has both motivational and structural components. People high in openness are motivated to seek new experiences and to engage in self-examination. Structurally, they have a fluid style of consciousness that allows them to make novel associations between remotely connected ideas. Closed people by contrast are more comfortable with familiar and traditional experiences.

=== Creativity ===
Openness to experience correlates with creativity, as measured by tests of divergent thinking. Openness has been linked to both artistic and scientific creativity as professional artists, musicians, and scientists have been found to score higher in openness compared to members of the general population.

=== Intelligence and knowledge ===
Openness to experience correlates with intelligence, correlation coefficients ranging from about r=.30 to r=.45. These relations vary significantly based on which component of intelligence is examined. For example, meta-analyses have found relations ranging from .08 with processing speed abilities to .29 with verbal abilities. Another common distinction is between crystallized intelligence and fluid intelligence. Some studies have found moderate associations with crystallized intelligence but only weak associations with fluid intelligence. In contrast, more recent meta-analyses have found more similar relations for crystallized and fluid abilities (.20 and .19, respectively). A study examining the facets of openness found that the Ideas and Actions facets had modest positive correlations with fluid intelligence (r=.20 and r=.07 respectively). Meta-analyses have also found the ideas, curiosity, and need for cognition facets (i.e., facets most associated with the intellect aspect of openness) to be positive correlates of fluid abilities with correlations ranging from .18 to .21. Fluid abilities may come more easily for people who tend to be curious and open to learning. Alternatively, people with strong fluid abilities may find it more enjoyable to ponder and explore ideas. Several studies have found positive associations between openness to experience and general knowledge, especially verbal knowledge. People high in openness may be more motivated to engage in intellectual pursuits that increase their knowledge. Openness to experience, especially the Ideas facet, is related to need for cognition, a motivational tendency to think about ideas, scrutinize information, and enjoy solving puzzles, and to typical intellectual engagement (a similar construct to need for cognition).

=== Absorption and hypnotisability ===
Openness to experience is strongly related to the psychological construct of absorption, defined as "a disposition for having episodes of 'total' attention that fully engage one's representational (i.e. perceptual, enactive, imaginative, and ideational) resources."

The construct of absorption was developed in order to relate individual differences in hypnotisability to broader aspects of personality. The construct of absorption influenced Costa and McCrae's development of the concept of "openness to experience" in their original NEO model, due to the independence of absorption from extraversion and neuroticism. A person's openness to becoming absorbed in experiences seems to require a more general openness to new and unusual experiences. Openness to experience, like absorption, has modest positive correlations with individual differences in hypnotisability.

Factor analysis shows that the fantasy, aesthetics, and feelings facets of openness are closely related to absorption and predict hypnotisability, whereas the remaining three facets of ideas, actions, and values are largely unrelated to these constructs. This finding suggests that openness to experience may have two distinct yet related subdimensions: one related to aspects of attention and consciousness assessed by the facets of fantasy, aesthetics, and feelings; the other related to intellectual curiosity and social/political liberalism as assessed by the remaining three facets. However, all of these have a common theme of 'openness' in some sense. This two-dimensional view of openness to experience is particularly pertinent to hypnotisability. However, when considering external criteria other than hypnotisability, it is possible that a different dimensional structure may be apparent, e.g. intellectual curiosity may be unrelated to social/political liberalism in certain contexts.

=== Relationship to other personality traits ===
Although the factors in the Big Five model are assumed to be independent, openness to experience and extraversion as assessed in the NEO-PI-R have a substantial positive correlation. Openness to experience also has a moderate positive correlation with sensation-seeking, particularly, the experience seeking facet. In spite of this, it has been argued that openness to experience is still an independent personality dimension from these other traits because most of the variance in the trait cannot be explained by its overlap with these other constructs. A study comparing the Temperament and Character Inventory with the Five Factor model found that Openness to experience had a substantial positive correlation with self-transcendence (a "spiritual" trait) and to a lesser extent novelty seeking (conceptually similar to sensation seeking). It also had a moderate negative correlation with harm avoidance.

The Myers–Briggs Type Indicator (MBTI) measures the preference of "intuition," which is related to openness to experience. Robert McCrae pointed out that the MBTI sensation versus intuition scale "contrasts a preference for the factual, simple, and conventional with a preference for the possible, complex, and original," and is therefore similar to measures of openness.

=== Social and political attitudes ===
There are social and political implications to this personality trait. In Western countries, people who are highly open to experience tend to be liberal and tolerant of diversity. As a consequence, they are generally more open to different cultures and lifestyles. They are lower in ethnocentrism, right-wing authoritarianism, social dominance orientation, and prejudice. Openness has a stronger (negative) relationship with right-wing authoritarianism than the other five-factor model traits (conscientiousness has a modest positive association, and the other traits have negligible associations). Openness has a somewhat smaller (negative) association with social dominance orientation than (low) agreeableness (the other traits have negligible associations). Openness has a stronger (negative) relationship with prejudice than the other five-factor model traits (agreeableness has a more modest negative association, and the other traits have negligible associations). However, right-wing authoritarianism and social dominance orientation are each more strongly (positively) associated with prejudice than openness or any of the other five-factor model traits.

The relationship between openness and prejudice may be more complex, as the prejudice examined was prejudice against conventional minority groups (for example sexual and ethnic minorities) and that people who are high in openness can still be intolerant of those with conflicting worldviews.

Regarding conservatism, studies have found that cultural conservatism was related to low openness and all its facets, but economic conservatism was unrelated to total openness, and only weakly negatively related to the Aesthetics and values facets. The strongest personality predictor of economic conservatism was low agreeableness (r=−.23). Economic conservatism is based more on ideology whereas cultural conservatism seems to be more psychological than ideological and may reflect a preference for simple, stable, and familiar mores. Some research indicates that within-person changes in levels of openness do not predict changes in conservatism.

According to a 2021 analysis by Princeton University academic Rory Truex of survey results, those discontented with the Chinese Communist Party (CCP) generally showed lower levels of openness to experience. The study did not find that openness to experience in China led to more liberal or critical political attitudes.

=== Subjective well-being and mental health ===
Openness to experience has modest yet significant correlations with happiness, positive affect, and quality of life, but is unrelated to life satisfaction, negative affect, and overall affect in people in general. These relationships with aspects of subjective well-being tend to be weaker than those of other five-factor model traits, that is, extraversion, neuroticism, conscientiousness, and agreeableness.

Openness to experience correlates with life satisfaction in older adults after controlling for confounding factors.

Openness appears to be unrelated to the presence of mental disorders. A meta-analysis of the relationships between five-factor model traits and symptoms of psychological disorders found that none of the diagnostic groups examined differed from healthy controls on openness to experience.

Openness to experience may contribute to graceful aging, facilitating healthy memory and verbal abilities as well as a number of other significant cognitive features in older adults.

=== Personality disorders ===
At least three aspects of openness are relevant to understanding personality disorders: cognitive distortions, lack of insight, and impulsivity. Problems related to high openness that can cause issues with social or professional functioning are excessive fantasizing, peculiar thinking, diffuse identity, unstable goals, and nonconformity with the demands of the society.

High openness is characteristic to schizotypal personality disorder (odd and fragmented thinking), narcissistic personality disorder (excessive self-valuation), and paranoid personality disorder (sensitivity to external hostility). Lack of insight (shows low openness) is characteristic to all personality disorders and could explain the persistence of maladaptive behavioral patterns.

Problems associated with low openness are difficulties adapting to change, low tolerance for different worldview or lifestyles, emotional flattening, alexithymia, and a narrow range of interests. Rigidity is the most obvious aspect of (low) openness among personality disorders; it shows lack of knowledge of one's emotional experiences. It is most characteristic of obsessive-compulsive personality disorder. Its opposite, known as impulsivity (here: an aspect of openness that shows a tendency to behave unusually or autistically), is characteristic of schizotypal and borderline personality disorders.

=== Religiosity and spirituality ===
Openness to experience has mixed relationships with different types of religiosity and spirituality. General religiosity has a weak association with low openness. Religious fundamentalism has a somewhat more substantial relationship with low openness. Mystical experiences occasioned by the use of psilocybin were found to increase openness significantly (see 'Drug Use,' below).

=== Gender ===
A study examining gender differences in big-five personality traits in 55 nations found that across nations there were negligible average differences between men and women in openness to experience. By contrast, across nations women were found to be significantly higher than men in average neuroticism, extraversion, agreeableness, and conscientiousness. In eight cultures, men were significantly higher than women in openness, but in four cultures women were significantly higher than men. Previous research found that women tend to be higher on the feelings facet of openness, whereas men tend to be higher on the ideas facet, although the 55-nation study did not assess individual facets.

=== Dream recall ===
A study on individual differences in the frequency of dream recall found that openness to experience was the only big-five personality trait related to dream recall. Dream recall frequency has also been related to similar personality traits, such as absorption and dissociation. The relationship between dream recall and these traits has been considered as evidence of the continuity theory of consciousness. People who have vivid and unusual experiences during the day, such as those who are high in these traits, tend to have more memorable dream content and hence better dream recall.

=== Sexuality ===
Openness is related to many aspects of sexuality. Men and women high in openness are more well-informed about sex and have wider sexual experience, stronger sex drives, and more liberal sexual attitudes. In married couples, wives' but not husbands' level of openness is related to sexual satisfaction. This might be because open wives are more willing to explore a variety of new sexual experiences, leading to greater satisfaction for both spouses. Compared to heterosexuals, people who are homosexual, asexual, or bisexual—particularly bisexuals—average higher in openness.

== Genes and physiology ==
Openness to experience, like the other traits in the five-factor model, is believed to have a genetic component. Identical twins (who have the same DNA) show similar scores on openness to experience, even when they have been adopted into different families and raised in very different environments. A meta-analysis by Bouchard and McGue, of four twin studies, found openness to be the most heritable (mean = 57%) of the Big Five traits.

Higher levels of openness have been linked to activity in the ascending dopaminergic system and the dorsolateral prefrontal cortex. Openness is the only personality trait that correlates with neuropsychological tests of dorsolateral prefrontal cortical function, supporting theoretical links among openness, cognitive functioning, and IQ.

== Geography ==
An Italian study found that people who lived on Tyrrhenian islands tended to be less open to experience than those living on the nearby mainland, and that people whose ancestors had inhabited the islands for twenty generations tended to be less open to experience than more recent arrivals. Additionally, people who emigrated from the islands to the mainland tended to be more open to experience than people who stayed on the islands, and than those who immigrated to the islands.

People living in the eastern and western parts of the United States tend to score higher on openness to experience than those living in the Midwestern United States and the Southern United States. The highest average scores on openness are found in the states of New York, Oregon, Massachusetts, Washington, and California. Lowest average scores come from North Dakota, Wyoming, Alaska, Alabama, and Wisconsin.

== Drug use ==
Psychologists in the early 1960s used the concept of openness to experience to describe people who are more likely to use marijuana. Openness was defined in these studies as high creativity, adventuresomeness, internal sensation novelty seeking, and low authoritarianism. Several correlational studies confirmed that young people who score high on this cluster of traits are more likely to use marijuana. More recent research replicated this finding using contemporary measures of openness.

Cross-cultural studies found that cultures high in Openness to experience have higher rates of use of the drug MDMA, although a study at the individual level in the Netherlands found no differences in openness levels between users and non-users. MDMA users tended to be higher in extroversion and lower in conscientiousness than non-users.

A 2011 study found Openness (and not other traits) increased after the use of psilocybin, an effect that held even after 14 months. The study found that individual differences in levels of mystical experience while taking psilocybin were correlated with increases in Openness. Participants who met criteria for a 'complete mystical experience' (Note: Six aspects of mystical experience were assessed: unity, transcendence of time and space, ineffability and paradoxicality, sacredness, noetic quality, and positive mood. Participants were deemed to have a 'complete' mystical experience if they scored 60% or higher on all six aspects.) experienced a significant mean increase in Openness, whereas those participants who did not meet the criteria experienced no mean change in Openness. Five of the six facets of Openness (all except Actions) showed this pattern of increase associated with having a mystical experience. Increases in Openness (including facets as well as total score) among those whose had a complete mystical experience were maintained more than a year after taking the drug. Participants who had a complete mystical experience changed more than four T-score points between baseline and follow up. By comparison, Openness has been found to normally decrease with aging by one T-score point per decade.

== See also ==
- Trait theory – Approach to the study of human personality
- Boundaries of the mind – Postulated personality trait
