= Harm avoidance =

- Specialty: Psychiatry

Harm avoidance (HA) is a personality trait characterized by excessive worrying; pessimism; shyness; and being fearful, doubtful, and easily fatigued. In MRI studies HA was correlated with reduced grey matter volume in the orbito-frontal, occipital and parietal regions.

Harm avoidance is a temperament assessed in the Temperament and Character Inventory (TCI), its revised version (TCI-R) and the Tridimensional Personality Questionnaire (TPQ) and is positively related to the trait neuroticism and inversely to extraversion in the Revised NEO Personality Inventory and the Eysenck Personality Questionnaire. Researchers have contended that harm avoidance represents a composite personality dimension with neurotic introversion at one end of the spectrum and stable extraversion at the other end. Harm avoidance has also been found to have moderate inverse relationships with conscientiousness and openness to experience in the five factor model.

The HA of TPQ and TCI-R has four subscales:

1. Anticipatory worry (HA1)
2. Fear of uncertainty (HA2)
3. Shyness/Shyness with strangers (HA3)
4. Fatigability/Fatigability and asthenia (weakness) (HA4)

It has been suggested that HA is related to high serotonergic activity, and much research has gone into investigating the link between HA and components of the serotonin system, e.g. genetic variation in 5-HTTLPR in the serotonin transporter gene.
