= Psychoticism =

Personality trait

Psychoticism is one of the three traits used by the psychologist Hans Eysenck in his outdated P–E–N (psychoticism, extraversion and neuroticism) model of personality. Psychoticism includes the traits of "aggression, coldness, egocentrism, impulsivity, lack of empathy, tough-mindedness, and being antisocial."

== Nature ==
Psychoticism is conceptually similar to the constraint factor in Tellegen's three-factor model of personality. Psychoticism may be divided into narrower traits such as impulsivity and sensation-seeking. These may in turn be further subdivided into even more specific traits. For example, impulsivity may be divided into narrow impulsivity (unthinking responsivity), risk taking, non-planning, and liveliness. Sensation seeking has also been analysed into a number of separate facets.

Eysenck argued that there might be a correlation between psychoticism and creativity.

== Critics ==
Critics of the trait have suggested that the trait is too heterogeneous to be taken as a single trait. Costa and McCrae believe that agreeableness and conscientiousness (both of which represent low levels of psychoticism) need to be distinguished in personality models. It has also been suggested that "psychoticism" may be a misnomer and that "psychopathy" or "Impulsive Unsocialized Sensation Seeking" would be better labels.

== Biological bases ==
Psychoticism is believed to be associated with levels of dopamine. Other biological correlates of psychoticism include low conditionability and low levels of monoamine oxidase; beta-hydroxylase, cortisol, norepinephrine in cerebrospinal fluid also appear relevant to psychoticism level.

Eysenck's theoretical basis for the model was the theory of Einheitspsychosen (unitary psychosis) of the nineteenth-century German psychiatrist Heinrich Neumann.

== See also ==
- Big Five personality traits
- Extraversion
- Neuroticism
- Schizotypy
