= Conscientiousness =

Personality trait of being orderly and following the rules

Illustration in a 1856 British textbook. It illustrated a text describing work as a religious activity; elaborating that "You live for this [to work], and you must not waste one hour of life, or when death is near, you will think with grief on that lost hour."

Conscientiousness is the personality trait of being responsible, careful, or diligent. Conscientiousness implies a desire to do a task well, and to take obligations to others seriously. Conscientious people tend to be efficient and organized as opposed to easy-going and disorderly. They tend to show self-discipline, act dutifully, and aim for achievement; they display planned rather than spontaneous behavior; and they are generally dependable. Conscientiousness manifests in characteristic behaviors such as being neat, systematic, careful, thorough, and deliberate (tending to think carefully before acting).

Conscientiousness is one of the five traits of both the Five Factor Model and the HEXACO model of personality and is an aspect of what has traditionally been referred to as having character. Conscientious individuals are generally hard-working and reliable. When taken to an extreme, they may also be "workaholics", perfectionists, and compulsive in their behavior. People who score low on conscientiousness tend to be laid back, less goal-oriented, and less driven by success, if they also score high on Big Five Agreeableness; otherwise, they are also more likely to engage in anti-social behavior and commit blue-collared crimes and crimes of passion.

== Personality models ==
Conscientiousness is one of the five major dimensions in the Big Five model of personality (also called Five Factor Model or OCEAN), which consists of openness to experience, conscientiousness, extraversion, agreeableness, and neuroticism. Two of many personality tests that assess these traits are Costa and McCrae's NEO PI-R and Goldberg's NEO-IPIP. According to these models, conscientiousness is a continuous dimension of personality, rather than a categorical "type" of person.

In the NEO framework, Conscientiousness has six facets: Competence, Order, Dutifulness, Achievement Striving, Self-Discipline, and Deliberation. Other models suggest a smaller set of two "aspects": orderliness and industriousness form an intermediate level of organization, with orderliness associated with the desire to keep things organized and tidy and industriousness being more associated with productivity and work ethic.

Other Big Five personality traits such as low extraversion, high agreeableness, low openness, and low neuroticism are linked to high conscientiousness.

Conscientiousness also appears in other models of personality, such as Cloninger's Temperament and Character Inventory, in which it is related to both self-directedness and persistence. The traits of rule consciousness and perfectionism are included in Cattell's 16 PF model. It is negatively associated with impulsive sensation-seeking in Zuckerman's alternative five model.

Traits associated with conscientiousness are frequently assessed by self-report integrity tests given by various corporations to prospective employees.

== Origin ==
Terms such as "hard-working", "reliable", and "persevering" describe desirable aspects of character. Because conscientiousness was once believed to be a moral evaluation, it was overlooked as a psychological attribute. The reality of individual differences in conscientiousness has now been clearly established by studies of cross-observer agreement. Peer and expert ratings confirm the self-reports that people make about their degrees of conscientiousness. Furthermore, both self-reports and observer ratings of conscientiousness predict real-life outcomes such as academic success.

During most of the 20th century, psychologists believed that personality traits could be divided into two categories: temperament and character. Temperament traits were thought to be biologically based, whereas character traits were thought to be learned either during childhood or throughout life. With the advent of the FFM (Five-Factor Model), behavior geneticists began systematic studies of the full range of personality traits, and it soon became clear that all five factors are substantially heritable. Identical twins showed very similar personality traits even when they had been separated at birth and raised apart, and this was true for both character traits and temperament traits. Parents and communities influence the ways in which conscientiousness is expressed, but they apparently do not influence its level.

== Measurement ==
A person's level of conscientiousness is generally assessed using self-report measures, although peer-reports and third-party observation can also be used. Self-report measures are either lexical or based on statements. Deciding which measure of either type to use in research is determined by an assessment of psychometric properties and the time and space constraints of the study being undertaken.

=== Lexical ===
Lexical measures use adjectives that reflect conscientiousness traits, such as "efficient" and "systematic", and are very space- and time-efficient for research purposes. Goldberg developed a 20-word measure as part of his 100-word Big Five markers. Saucier developed a briefer 8-word measure as part of his 40-word mini-markers. Thompson revised these measures to develop the International English Mini-Markers which has superior validity and reliability in populations both within and outside North America. Internal consistency reliability of the International English Mini-Markers for the Conscientiousness measure for native English-speakers is reported as .90, that for non-native English-speakers is .86.

=== Statement ===
Statement measures tend to comprise more words than lexical measures, so consume more research instrument space and more respondent time to complete. Respondents are asked the extent to which they, for example, often forget to put things back in their proper place, or are careful to avoid making mistakes. Some statement-based measures of conscientiousness have similarly acceptable psychometric properties in North American populations to lexical measures, but their generally emic development makes them less suited to use in other populations. For instance, statements in colloquial North American English like Often forget to put things back in their proper place or Am careful to avoid making mistakes can be hard for non-native English-speakers to understand, suggesting internationally validated measures might be more appropriate for research conducted with non-North Americans.

== Behavior ==
=== Development ===
Currently, little is known about conscientiousness in young children because the self-report inventories typically used to assess it are not appropriate for that age group. There are likely individual differences in this factor at an early age. Children who have attention deficit/hyperactivity disorder are likely to struggle with concentration, organization, and persistence due to the disorder. Longitudinal and cross-sectional studies suggest that conscientiousness is relatively low among adolescents but increases between 18 and 30 years of age. Conscientiousness generally increases with age from 21 to 60, though the rate of increase is slow.

Individual differences are strongly preserved, meaning that a careful, neat, and scrupulous 30-year-old is likely to become a careful, neat, and scrupulous 80-year-old.

=== Daily life ===
People who score high on the trait of conscientiousness tend to be more organized and less cluttered in their homes and offices. For example, their books tend to be neatly shelved in alphabetical order, or categorized by topic, rather than scattered around the room. Their clothes tend to be folded and arranged in drawers or closets instead of lying on the floor. The presence of planners and to-do lists are also signs of conscientiousness. Their homes tend to have better lighting than the homes of people who score low on this trait.

=== Academic and workplace performance ===
Conscientiousness correlates with successful academic performance in students and workplace performance among managers and workers. Low levels of conscientiousness are strongly associated with procrastination. Conscientiousness has a moderate to large positive correlation with performance in the workplace, and in contrast, after general mental ability is taken into account, the other four Big Five personality traits do not aid in predicting career success.

Conscientious employees are generally more reliable, more motivated, and harder working. They have lower rates of absenteeism and counterproductive work behaviors such as stealing and fighting with other employees. Furthermore, conscientiousness is the personality trait that correlates the most with performance across all categories of jobs. Agreeableness and emotional stability may also be important, particularly in jobs that involve a significant amount of social interaction. Of all manager/leader types, top executives show the lowest level of rule-following, a conscientious trait. Conscientiousness is not always positively related to job performance; sometimes the opposite is true. Being too conscientious could lead to taking too much time in making urgent decisions and to being too attached to the rules and lacking innovation.

=== Subjective well-being ===
A 2008 meta-analysis found that conscientiousness has a positive relationship with subjective well-being, particularly satisfaction with life. Highly conscientious people tend to be happier with their lives than those who score low on this trait. Although conscientiousness is generally seen as a positive trait to possess, research suggests that in some situations it may be harmful for well-being. In a prospective study of 9,570 people over four years, highly conscientious people suffered more than twice as much if they became unemployed. The authors suggested this may be due to conscientious people making different attributions about why they became unemployed, or through experiencing stronger reactions following failure. This finding is consistent with perspectives which see no trait as inherently positive or negative, but rather the consequences of the trait being dependent on the situation and concomitant goals and motivations.

=== Problematic life outcomes ===
Low conscientiousness is linked to anti-social behavior, blue-collared crimes, and crimes of passion, as well as unemployment and homelessness. Low conscientiousness and low agreeableness taken together are also associated with substance use disorders. People low in conscientiousness have difficulty saving money and their risky borrowing practices make them fall prey to subprime and predatory lending more often than conscientious people. High conscientiousness is associated with more careful planning of shopping trips and less impulse buying of unneeded items. While conscientiousness is generally linked to a lower level of anti-social behaviour, it is not always the case, and conscientiousness is not always negatively correlated with criminality. It has been shown that conscientiousness is positively correlated with business, white-collared, and premeditated criminal behavior.

=== Health and longevity ===
According to a multi-decade study begun in 1921 by psychologist Lewis Terman on over 1,500 gifted adolescent Californians, "The strongest predictor of long life was conscientiousness." Specific behaviors associated with low conscientiousness may explain its influence on longevity. Nine different behaviors that are among the leading causes of mortality—alcohol use, disordered eating (including obesity), drug use, lack of exercise, risky sexual behavior, risky driving, tobacco use, violence, and suicide—are all predicted by low conscientiousness. Health behaviors are more strongly correlated with the "conventionality" rather than the "impulse-control" aspect of conscientiousness. Apparently, social norms influence many health-relevant behaviors, such as healthy diet, exercise, not smoking, and moderate drinking, and highly conscientious people adhere the most strongly to these norms. Conscientiousness is positively related to health behaviors such as regular visits to a doctor, checking smoke alarms, and adherence to medication regimens. Such behavior may better safeguard health and prevent disease. The only known health benefits of low conscientiousness are relaxation and reduced anxiety.

=== Relationships ===
Relationship quality is positively associated with partners' levels of conscientiousness. Highly conscientious people are less likely to get divorced due to their own fault. Conscientiousness is associated with lower rates of behavior associated with at-fault divorce, such as extramarital affairs, spousal abuse, and alcohol use disorder. Conscientious behaviors may have a direct influence on relationship quality, as people low in conscientiousness are less responsible, less responsive to their partners, more condescending, and less likely to hold back offensive comments. More conscientious people are better at managing conflict and tend to provoke fewer disagreements, perhaps because they elicit less criticism due to their well-controlled and responsible behavior.

=== Intelligence ===
Conscientiousness has distinct sub-components, including two major branches (i.e., orderliness and industriousness). The largest set of meta-analyses found that these branches of conscientiousness have disparate connections with cognitive abilities. Orderliness has negative correlations with some cognitive abilities (e.g., fluid reasoning abilities, math knowledge, lexical knowledge, and science knowledge) whereas industriousness has strikingly positive correlations with multiple abilities (e.g., general mental ability, memory, processing speed, and knowledge).

Some previous studies in selected samples (e.g., job candidates, university students) have found negative correlations between conscientiousness and intelligence. One potential explanation is that these negative correlations may be artificially created by the selection of the sample. For example, with students who are low on one trait and high on the other (negative relationship) using the strong one to compensate and pass the selection, while students who are low on both (positive relationship) are removed by the selection.

=== Political attitudes ===
Conscientiousness correlates with conservative political attitudes.

Because conscientiousness is positively related to job performance, conservative service workers have been shown to earn higher ratings, evaluations, and tips than their liberal counterparts.

Although right-wing authoritarianism is one of the most powerful predictors of prejudice, a large scale meta-analysis found that conscientiousness itself is uncorrelated with general prejudice. Rebellion against control is significantly negatively correlated with conscientiousness.

Hence, conscientiousness is associated only with rule compliance, obedience, and integrity, not necessarily with right-wing authoritarianism, which requires reduced Big Five Agreeableness as well.

High conscientiousness does not always lead to prosocial behaviour. In a Milgram experiment, conscientious and agreeable people, when advised by an ill-intending authority, are more willing to administer high-intensity electric shocks to a victim, because conscientious and agreeable people are less capable of resistance.

==== China ====
According to a 2021 analysis by Princeton University academic Rory Truex of survey results, high contentiousness in China correlates with support and membership of the Chinese Communist Party (CCP), while low contentiousness correlates with discontent with the CCP.

==== Russia ====
According to a 2017 research, higher conscientiousness in Russia is correlated with support for President Vladimir Putin, while lower contentiousness is correlated with the opposite.

=== Creativity ===
The orderliness/dependability subfactors (order, dutifulness, and deliberation) of conscientiousness correlate negatively with creativity while the industriousness/achievement subfactors (competence, achievement striving, and self-discipline) correlate positively. People who score high on the order subfactor of conscientiousness show less innovative behavior, especially if coupled with a low score on the industrious subfactor. Group conscientiousness has a negative effect on group performance during creative tasks. Groups with only conscientious members have difficulty solving open-ended problems.

=== Adaptability ===
A study from 2006 found that those scoring low on conscientiousness make better decisions after unanticipated changes in the context of a task. Specifically, the subfactors order, dutifulness, and deliberation negatively correlated with decision-making quality, but not competence, achievement striving, and self-discipline.

=== Religiosity ===
General religiosity was mainly correlated with high Agreeableness and Conscientiousness among the Big Five traits.

=== Conscience ===
Conscientiousness in psychology is defined, as noted above, by notions such as "orderliness and industriousness", not by reference to the ordinary language notion of conscience, or such as is referred to in the legal doctrine of equity, by concern with preventing unconscionable actions.

== Geography ==
=== United States ===
Average levels of conscientiousness vary by state in the United States. People living in the central part, including the states of Kansas, Nebraska, Oklahoma, and Missouri, on average have higher scores than people living in other regions. People in the southwestern states of New Mexico, Utah, and Arizona also have relatively high average scores on conscientiousness. Among the eastern states, Florida is the only one that scores in the top ten for this personality trait. The four states with the lowest scores on conscientiousness on average were, in descending order, Rhode Island, Hawaii, Maine, and Alaska.

=== Great Britain ===
A large scale survey of residents of Great Britain found that average levels of all the Big Five, including conscientiousness, vary across regional districts in England, Wales, and Scotland. High levels of conscientiousness were found throughout much of Southern England, scattered areas of the Midlands, and most of the Scottish Highlands. Low levels of conscientiousness were observed in London, Wales, and parts of the North of England. Higher mean levels of regional conscientiousness were positively correlated with voting for Toryism and the Conservative Party, and negatively correlated with voting for the Labour Party, in the 2005 and 2010 elections, and also correlated with a higher proportion of married residents, with higher life expectancy for men and women, fewer long-term health problems, and with lower rates of mortality from stroke, cancer, and heart disease. Higher regional conscientiousness was also correlated with lower median annual income in 2011.

== See also ==
- Personality psychology – Branch of psychology focused on personality
