= Trait theory =

Approach to the study of human personality

In psychology, trait theory (also called dispositional theory) is an approach to the study of human personality. Trait theorists are primarily interested in the measurement of traits, which can be defined as habitual patterns of behavior, thought, and emotion. According to this perspective, traits are aspects of personality that are relatively stable over time, differ across individuals (e.g., some people are outgoing whereas others are not), are relatively consistent over situations, and influence behaviour. Traits are in contrast to states, which are more transitory dispositions. Traits such as extraversion vs. introversion are measured on a spectrum, with each person placed somewhere along it.

Trait theory suggests that some natural behaviours may give someone an advantage in a position of leadership.

There are two approaches to define traits: as internal causal properties or as purely descriptive summaries. The internal causal definition states that traits influence our behaviours, leading us to do things in line with that trait. On the other hand, traits as descriptive summaries are descriptions of our actions that do not try to infer causality.

== History ==
American psychologist Gordon Allport was an early pioneer in the study of traits. This early work was viewed as the beginning of the modern psychological study of personality. He also referred to traits within his work as dispositions. In his approach, "cardinal" traits are those that dominate and shape a person's behavior; their ruling passions/obsessions, such as a need for money, fame etc. By contrast, "central" traits such as honesty are characteristics found in some degree in every person – and finally "secondary" traits are those seen only in certain circumstances (such as particular likes or dislikes that a very close friend may know), which are included to provide a complete picture of human complexity.

A wide variety of alternative theories and scales were later developed, including:

- Raymond Cattell's 16PF Questionnaire
- J. P. Guilford's Structure of Intellect
- Henry Murray's System of Needs
- Timothy Leary's Interpersonal circumplex
- Myers–Briggs Type Indicator
- Gray's Biopsychological theory of personality

Currently, two general approaches are the most popular:

- Eysenck Personality Questionnaire, (EPQ) ("the three-factor model"). Using factor analysis, Hans Eysenck suggested that personality is reducible to three major traits: neuroticism, extraversion, and psychoticism.
- Big Five personality traits, ("the five-factor model"). Many psychologists currently believe that five factors are sufficient: neuroticism, extraversion, openness to experience, agreeableness, and conscientiousness.

== Trait theory in cross-cultural use ==
Cultures are widely known and accepted as being different in varying degrees. This can make the study of personality difficult as meaning and the expression of traits may be different within cultural groups. Trait theory uses a hierarchy of traits in order to separate culture from the traits; it can be said the culture is ignored in order to focus on the individual traits and how they are connected to the individual. Gordon Allport's trait theory not only served as a foundational approach within personality psychology, but also is continued to be viewed and discussed by other disciplines such as anthropology because of how he approached culture within trait theory.

Trait theory tends to focus on the individual over the situation in which they are in. This focus has relaxed within modern studies allowing for a consideration of the external factors outside of the self. As the focus becomes more relaxed (but still prominent as it is a main part of the theory) research expands.

== Comparing EPQ and Big Five ==
=== Testing methodology, and factors ===
Both the EPQ and Big Five approaches extensively use self-report questionnaires. The factors are intended to be orthogonal (uncorrelated), though there are often small positive correlations between factors. The five factor model in particular has been criticized for losing the orthogonal structure between factors. British psychologist Hans Eysenck has argued that fewer factors are superior to a larger number of partly related ones. Although these two approaches are comparable because of the use of factor analysis to construct hierarchical taxonomies, they differ in the organization and number of factors.

Whatever the causes, psychoticism marks the two approaches apart, as the five factor model contains no such trait. Moreover, psychoticism, unlike any of the other factors in either approach, does not fit a normal distribution curve. Indeed, scores are rarely high, thus skewing a normal distribution. However, when they are high, there is considerable overlap with psychiatric conditions such as antisocial and schizoid personality disorders. Similarly, high scorers on neuroticism are more susceptible to sleep and psychosomatic disorders. Five factor approaches can also predict future mental disorders.

=== Lower-order factors ===
Similarities between lower-order factors for psychoticism and the facets of openness, agreeableness, and conscientiousness (from Matthews, Deary & Whiteman, 2003)

There are two higher-order factors that both taxonomies clearly share: extraversion and neuroticism. Both approaches broadly accept that extraversion is associated with sociability and positive affect, whereas neuroticism is associated with emotional instability and negative affect.

Many lower-order factors, or facets, are similar between the two taxonomies. For instance, both approaches contain factors for sociability/gregariousness, for activity levels, and for assertiveness within the higher order factor extraversion. However, there are differences too. First, the three-factor approach contains nine lower-order factors and the five-factor approach has six.

Eysenck's psychoticism factor incorporates some of the polar opposites of the lower order factors of openness, agreeableness and conscientiousness. A high scorer on tough-mindedness in psychoticism would score low on tender-mindedness in agreeableness. Most of the differences between the taxonomies stem from the three factor model's emphasis on fewer high-order factors.

=== Causality ===
Although both major trait models are descriptive, only the three-factor model offers a detailed causal explanation. Eysenck suggests that different personality traits are caused by the properties of the brain, which themselves are the result of genetic factors. In particular, the three-factor model identifies the reticular system and the limbic system in the brain as key components that mediate cortical arousal and emotional responses respectively. Eysenck advocates that extraverts have low levels of cortical arousal and introverts have high levels, leading extraverts to seek out more stimulation from socializing and being venturesome. Moreover, Eysenck surmised that there would be an optimal level of arousal, after which inhibition would occur and that this would be different for each person.

In a similar vein, the three-factor approach theorizes that neuroticism is mediated by levels of arousal in the limbic system and that individual differences arise because of variable activation thresholds between people. Therefore, highly neurotic people when presented with minor stressors, will exceed this threshold, whereas people low in neuroticism will not exceed normal activation levels, even when presented with large stressors. By contrast, proponents of the five-factor approach assume a role of genetics and environment but offer no explicit causal explanation.

Given this emphasis on biology in the three-factor approach, it would be expected that the third trait, psychoticism, would have a similar explanation. However, the causal properties of this state are not well defined. Eysenck has suggested that psychoticism is related to testosterone levels and is an inverse function of the serotonergic system, but he later revised this, linking it instead to the dopaminergic system.

== List of personality traits ==
After examining thousands of personality measures and numerous personality trait frameworks, researchers have created "super-frameworks" that aim to encapsulate all personality traits into a single model (e.g., Pan-Hierarchical Five Factor Model). These models also sometimes identify measures that can be used to measure traits/constructs in the models.

Other examples of personality traits
Openness to experience	Composed of two related but separable traits, Openness to Experience and Intellect. Behavioral aspects include having wide interests, and being imaginative and insightful, correlated with activity in the dorsolateral prefrontal cortex. Considered primarily a cognitive trait.
Conscientiousness	Scrupulous, meticulous, principled behavior guided or conforming to one's own conscience. Associated with the dorsolateral prefrontal cortex.
Extroversion	Gregarious, outgoing, sociable, projecting one's personality outward. The opposite of extroversion is introversion. Extroversion has shown to share certain genetic markers with substance abuse. Extroversion is associated with various regions of the prefrontal cortex and the amygdala.
Agreeableness	Refers to a compliant, trusting, empathic, sympathetic, friendly and cooperative nature.
Neuroticism	Identifies people who are prone to psychological distress. Individuals who are high in neuroticism tend to be anxious, depressed, self-conscious, impulsive, vulnerable and display angry hostility. "Neuroticism is the major factor of personality pathology." Neuroticism has been linked to serotonin transporter (5-HTT) binding sites in the thalamus: as well as activity in the insular cortex. Neuroticism also predicts the occurrence of more negative life experiences.
Honesty-humility	Tendency towards sincerity, modesty, fairness, and greed avoidance. Those who score high on this trait feel little desire to manipulate others or to break the rules for personal gain.
Self-esteem	A "favorable or unfavorable attitude toward oneself". An individual's sense of his or her value or worth, or the extent to which a person values, approves of, appreciates, prizes, or likes him or herself".
Harm avoidance	A tendency towards shyness, being fearful and uncertain, tendency to worry. Neonatal complications such as preterm birth have been shown to affect harm avoidance. People affected by eating disorders exhibit high levels of harm avoidance. The volume of the left amygdala in girls was correlated to levels of HA, in separate studies HA was correlated with reduced grey matter volume in the orbitofrontal, occipital and parietal regions.
Novelty seeking	Impulsive, exploratory, fickle, excitable, quick-tempered, and extravagant. Associated with addictive behavior.
Sensory processing sensitivity (SPS)	The defining trait of highly sensitive persons, characterized by the increased depth of processing of sensory input that underlies HSPs' greater proclivity to overstimulation, emotional reactivity and empathy, and sensitivity to stimuli.
Perfectionism	"I don't think needing to be perfect is in any way adaptive." (Paul Hewitt, PhD) Socially prescribed perfectionism – "believing that others will value you only if you are perfect." Self-oriented perfectionism – "an internally motivated desire to be perfect." Perfectionism is one of the traits associated with obsessional behavior and like obsessionality is also believed to be regulated by the basal ganglia.
Alexithymia	The inability to express emotions. "To have no words for one's inner experience". In studies done with stroke patients, alexithymia was found to be more prevalent in those who developed lesions in the right hemisphere following a cerebral infarction. There is a positive association with post-traumatic stress disorder (PTSD), childhood abuse and neglect and alexithymia. Utilizing psychometric testing and fMRI, studies showed positive response in the insula, posterior cingulate cortex (PCC), and thalamus.
Rigidity	Inflexibility, difficulty making transitions, adherence to set patterns. Mental rigidity arises out of a deficit of the executive functions. Originally termed frontal lobe syndrome it is also referred to as dysexecutive syndrome and usually occurs as a result of damage to the frontal lobe. This may be due to physical damage, disease (such as Huntington's disease) or a hypoxic or anoxic insult.
Impulsivity	Risk taking, lack of planning, and making up one's mind quickly. A component of disinhibition. Abnormal patterns of impulsivity have been linked to lesions in the right inferior frontal gyrus and in studies done by Antonio Damasio, author of Descartes' Error, damage to the ventromedial prefrontal cortex has been shown to cause a defect in real-life decision making in individuals with otherwise normal intellect. Those who sustain this type of damage are oblivious to the future consequences of their actions and live in the here and now.
Disinhibition	Behavioral disinhibition is an inability or unwillingness to constrain impulses, it is a key component of executive functioning. Researchers have emphasized poor behavioral inhibition as the central impairment of ADHD. It may be symptomatic of orbitofrontal lobe syndrome, a subtype of frontal lobe syndrome which may be an acquired disorder as a result of traumatic brain injury, hypoxic ischemic encephalopathy (HIE), anoxic encephalopathy, degenerative diseases such as Parkinson's, bacterial or viral infections such as Lyme disease and neurosyphilis. Disinhibition has been consistently associated with substance abuse disorders, obesity, higher BMI, excessive eating, an increased rate of eating, and perceived hunger.
Psychoticism	Psychoticism is a personality pattern typified by aggressiveness and interpersonal hostility, one of four traits in Hans Eysenck's model of personality. High levels of this trait were believed by Eysenck to be linked to increased vulnerability to psychosis such as schizophrenia. He also believed that blood relatives of psychotics would show high levels of this trait, suggesting a genetic basis to the trait.
Obsessionality	Persistent, often unwelcome, and frequently disturbing ideas, thoughts, images or emotions, rumination, often inducing an anxious state. Obsessionality may result as a dysfunction of the basal ganglia.

== See also ==
- 16 Personality Factors – Self-report personality test
- Alternative five model of personality
- Big Five personality traits – Personality model consisting of five broad dimensions
- Cultural schema theory – Cognitive theory at the cultural level
- HEXACO model of personality structure – Six-dimensional model of human personality
- Minnesota Multiphasic Personality Inventory – Standardized psychometric measure of psychopathology and personality
- NEO-PI – Big Five personality trait inventory
- Personality psychology – Branch of psychology focused on personality
- Social investment theory – Psychological theory
- Szondi test – 1935 discredited psychological test
- Trait activation theory – Theory of personality-job fit
