= Detachment in personality disorder =

Detachment in personality disorder may refer to:

- Detachment in personality disorder or personality difficulty – an ICD-11 trait diagnosis
- Emotional detachment – a phenomenon sometimes seen in personality disorders
- Social withdrawal – a phenomenon sometimes seen in personality disorders
- Detachment as a pathological trait domain within criterion B of the Alternative DSM-5 model for personality disorders
