= Malignant narcissism =

Theoretical personality disorder construct

Malignant narcissism is a theoretical personality disorder construct conceptually distinguished from typical narcissistic personality disorder (NPD) by the presence of antisocial behavior, egosyntonic sadism, and a paranoid orientation, while still retaining some capacity for guilt and loyalty.

Malignant narcissism is conceptualized as a subcategory of NPD, rather than being recognized as a diagnostic category in any major classification system for mental disorders, namely DSM-5-TR, or ICD-11, the latter of which diagnoses personality disorders dimensionally rather than categorically. Although it is not recognized as its own distinct disorder, the Alternative DSM-5 Model for Personality Disorders - presented in section III of both DSM-5 and DSM-5-TR - explicitly mentions "malignant narcissism" as an example of a case when additional antagonistic traits characteristic of antisocial personality disorder may be specified for NPD.

== History ==
=== Early uses of the term ===
The social psychologist Erich Fromm first coined the term "malignant narcissism" in 1964. He characterized the condition as a solipsistic form of narcissism, in which the individual takes pride in their own inherent traits rather than their achievements, and thus does not require a connection to other people or to reality. Edith Weigert (1967) saw malignant narcissism as a "regressive escape from frustration by distortion and denial of reality", while Herbert Rosenfeld (1971) described it as "a disturbing form of narcissistic personality where grandiosity is built around aggression and the destructive aspects of the self become idealized." Psychoanalyst George H. Pollock wrote in 1978: "The malignant narcissist is presented as pathologically grandiose, lacking in conscience and behavioral regulation with characteristic demonstrations of joyful cruelty and sadism". In 1983, M. Scott Peck used malignant narcissism as a way to explain evil.

=== Proposal as a diagnosis ===
Psychoanalyst Otto Kernberg first introduced his ideas on narcissistic personalities in 1970. At that time, he used the word "psychopathy" to describe a form of narcissistic personality that included antisocial and sadistic traits, but he did not yet use the term "malignant narcissism". He described the antisocial personality as fundamentally narcissistic and lacking morality, with a sadistic element that created, in essence, a sadistic psychopath.

In 1984, Kernberg first proposed malignant narcissism as a psychiatric diagnosis. He described malignant narcissism as a syndrome characterized by a narcissistic personality disorder (NPD), antisocial features, paranoid traits, and egosyntonic aggression. Other symptoms may include an absence of conscience, a psychological need for power, and grandiosity.

In November 2025, in an interview with Der Spiegel, Kernberg stated that, in his assessment, the president of the United States, Donald Trump, exhibits defining features of malignant narcissism in his political conduct, including grandiosity, aggression, vindictiveness, and a willingness to disregard moral constraints in order to prevail.

As of 2025, malignant narcissism has not been included as a diagnostic category in any of the diagnostic manuals, such as the International Classification of Diseases (ICD) or the Diagnostic and Statistical Manual of Mental Disorders (DSM). The conceptual framework for personality disorders in the ICD-11 – the latest edition of the ICD – does indeed not have any separate diagnoses for distinct personality disorders; rather, personality disorder itself is classified dimensionally based on severity, and can be specified by prominent personality traits or patterns. The DSM-5 and DSM-5-TR have retained the categorical, polythetic personality disorder classification from the DSM-IV-TR. However, both also contain the Alternative DSM-5 Model for Personality Disorders, which contains its own conceptual model of NPD; for this diagnosis, the AMPD exemplifies additional antagonistic specifiers as in the case of "malignant narcissism".

== Relation to other concepts and diagnoses ==
Kernberg believed that malignant narcissism exists on a spectrum of pathological narcissism, with varying degrees of severity. He viewed it as more severe than typical narcissistic personality disorder but not as extreme as psychopathy. In malignant narcissism, NPD is accompanied by additional symptoms of antisocial, paranoid and sadistic personality disorders.

Because malignant narcissism entails traits associated with antisocial personality disorder, individuals exhibiting malignant narcissism are believed to show a more pervasive lack of empathy and a diminished capacity for guilt or remorse compared to those with narcissistic personality disorder alone. Contemporary research distinguishes between cognitive empathy, the capacity to recognize what another person is feeling, and affective empathy, the capacity to share that feeling. Narcissistic pathology is most consistently associated with deficits in affective empathy, while cognitive empathy is often preserved or even heightened, which can support the strategic and exploitative use of social information characteristic of malignant narcissism. In Kernberg's view, malignant narcissists, unlike psychopaths, have the capacity to internalize moral structures, including both positive (idealized) and negative (aggressive) influences from early childhood. However, instead of feeling guilt or moral conflict, they admire and idealize their aggressive and sadistic tendencies, seeing them as a source of strength and superiority.

Psychopaths, by contrast, lack this capacity for internalization altogether—they have no real moral framework to either reject or embrace. Malignant narcissists, in contrast to psychopaths, also have the capacity to identify with powerful, idealized figures, often as part of a tightly connected "gang." This identification enables them to develop a limited sense of loyalty and some internalized object relations. As a result, some malignant narcissists may engage in antisocial behavior, such as leading violent gangs or terrorist groups, while maintaining a sense of loyalty toward their fellow members.

=== Sadism and cruelty ===
Psychologist Keith Campbell has defined malignant narcissism specifically as the rare but dangerous combination of narcissism and sadism. Malignant narcissism is highlighted as a key area in the study of mass murder, sexual sadism, and serial murder. Due to the sadistic component of malignant narcissism, an individual with this disorder may not only lack feelings of guilt or remorse for, but may even derive pleasure from inflicting emotional or physical pain on others. Sadistic traits were formerly codified in the DSM-III-R under sadistic personality disorder, but no subsequent editions of the DSM recognize a personality disorder associated specifically with sadism.

=== Paranoia ===
The importance of malignant narcissism and of projection as a defense mechanism has been confirmed in paranoia, as well as "the patient's vulnerability to malignant narcissistic regression". Because a malignant narcissist's personality cannot tolerate any criticism, being mocked typically causes paranoia.

== Therapy ==
Treatment is recommended in a therapeutic community, as well as a psychoeducational preventative program aimed at both mental health professionals and the general public.

Typically, in the analysis of a malignant narcissist, "the patient attempts to triumph over the analyst by destroying the analysis and himself or herself"; an extreme version of what Jacques Lacan described as "that resistance of the amour-propre... which is often expressed thus: 'I can't bear the thought of being freed by anyone other than myself'".

== See also ==
- Narcissism (personality style)
- Subtypes of NPD
- Narcissistic leadership
- Narcissistic supply
- The Mask of Sanity
- Dangerous and severe personality disorder
