= Classification of personality disorders =

Classification of personality disorders varies significantly, with the predominant models being either categorical or dimensional. As in the case of broader classification of mental disorders, personality disorders are mainly classified in accordance with two diagnostic frameworks: namely, the Diagnostic and Statistical Manual of Mental Disorders (DSM) and the International Classification of Diseases (ICD). As of 2026, the latest editions of these are the DSM-5-TR and ICD-11, respectively. While the main system in the former classifies personality disorders as distinct categories; the latter classifies a single personality disorder dimensionally according to severity, with the option to additionally diagnose trait domains. A hybrid approach is implemented in the Alternative DSM-5 Model for Personality Disorders, with diagnoses being specific or trait specified; both of these are based on both severity and traits. The ICD-11 classifies schizotypal disorder among primary psychotic disorders rather than as a personality disorder as in the DSM-5.

== Conceptual approaches ==
Personality disorder classification can generally be broken down into a categorical approach and a dimensional approach. The categorical approach views personality disorders as discrete entities that are distinct from each other as well as from normal personality. In contrast, the dimensional approach suggests that personality disorders exist on a continuum, with traits varying in degree rather than kind. There has been a sustained movement toward replacing categorical models of personality disorder classification with dimensional approaches. This dimensional perspective may allow for more nuanced understanding and flexible diagnostic practices.

=== Categorical approach ===
Classical views of personality disorder as discrete categories have had benefits for understanding and communicating psychopathology throughout history, such as for: a contained organization of symptoms to facilitate standardized research, organizing public awareness and stigma reduction campaigns, allocating public health funding and appropriate treatment intensities, and normalizing clear labels for communicating patient formulations (a description of symptoms and their inter-relationships) to professionals and families.

Since its inception, the categorical system has steadily accumulated criticism. Attempts to reproduce the factor structure of the DSM-IV-TR's categorical model have been unsuccessful, suggesting that the categorical structure cannot robustly describe the architecture of personality psychopathology. Such issues are exacerbated by the substantial symptom overlap between disorders that facilitates their excessive and unwarranted comorbidity, with the majority of people with a PD being eligible for another PD diagnosis. As a result, individuals are substantially more likely to be diagnosed with several PDs than a singular one, contradicting the notion that categories provide neat constellations of inter-related symptoms.

Equally, this approach appears unable to accurately capture the full range of personality psychopathology. Estimates of patients who do not fit neatly into current categories range from 21 to 49%, accordingly given the general diagnosis of Personality Disorder – Not Otherwise Specified (PD-NOS). PD-NOS also appears to be in regular usage to describe mixed or complex presentations given the difficulties in classifying individuals within the current framework. It has been found that "many patients in clinical practice misleadingly receive multiple PD diagnoses, a 'not otherwise specified' PD diagnosis, or no PD diagnosis at all, even if a PD diagnosis is relevant to the presentation". Another issue is the heterogeneity within categories.

Setting standardized diagnostic thresholds (based upon polythetic symptoms) is difficult particularly when each symptom is given equal weighting. This means that individuals with the same number of symptoms can have substantially different levels of distress. Between each PD, diagnostic thresholds occur at different levels of pathology. Due to these issues, it is likely that many clinicians use their clinical judgment based upon an internalized representation of the disorder when making diagnoses. The current categorical approach falls short of fully representing personality psychopathology and providing a scientifically robust understanding of what personality is and what disorders of personality are.

=== Dimensional approach ===
In response to observed deficiencies in the categorical approach, dimensional models, which suggest that humans differ in degree not in kind, have been developed, assessing personality disorders in terms of severity of impairment and maladaptive personality traits. Within this perspective, PD occurs at maladaptive extremes of the standard personality traits all humans share and as specific combinations of these trait extremes. The degree of life impairment forms the basis for a PD diagnosis. This approach has gained substantial support, with broad calls and movements toward mainstream adoption.

The shift towards dimensional models is reflected in the inclusion of the AMPD in Section III of the DSM-5, and in the ICD-11's adoption of a dimensional system. These are believed to ameliorate several shortcomings of the categorical model, as well as improve clinical utility and potentially reduce stigma, although no research has so far specifically examined the effect on stigma. Emerging research indicates that dimensional models may also facilitate the personalization of psychotherapy by aligning treatment strategies with underlying trait dimensions rather than diagnostic categories. Despite some important differences in the prevailing approaches, dimensional models of PD typically consider two key criteria: severity and style.

Mapping of ICD-11 PD classification to the AMPD
ICD-11	AMPD
Severity level	Criterion A
None	No impairment (0)
Personality difficulty	Mild impairment (1)
Mild personality disorder	Moderate impairment (2)
Moderate personality disorder	Severe impairment (3)
Severe personality disorder	Extreme impairment (4)
Traits and patterns	Criterion B
Negative affectivity	Negative Affectivity
Detachment	Detachment
Disinhibition	Disinhibition
Dissociality	Antagonism
Anankastia	(Rigid perfectionism) (Note: Conceptualized as low level of Disinhibition in the AMPD.)
(Schizotypal disorder)	Psychoticism

==== Severity ====
Severity captures the core distress that is common to all PDs, its impact on the individual's self-direction and identity (intrapersonal functioning), as well as their ability to form close relationships and empathize with others (interpersonal functioning). Indices of global severity are robust predictors of both the presence of a personality disorder and prognosis, and track with fluctuations in clinical functioning. According to the ICD-11, severity is the key and sole requirement for making a diagnosis of PD. The central placement of impairment is grounded in research that global severity ratings are sensitive and specific predictors of PD, and provide better estimates of clinician-rated psychosocial impairment than specific categorical diagnoses do. The severity of personality disorder (i.e., mild, moderate, severe) may be more indicative of dysfunction and outcomes than the specific typology of the disorder.

==== Style ====
The second criterion describes the stylistic features of the presentation, largely in relation to some derivation of the Five-Factor Model (FFM) of personality. The DSM-5's Alternative Model of Personality Disorders (AMPD) Criterion B comprises the traits of negative affectivity (continua from emotional stability to neuroticism), detachment (introversion to extroversion), antagonism (agreeableness to antagonism), disinhibition (conscientiousness to impulsivity), and psychoticism (closed to experience to open to experience). The DSM-5's approach to diagnosing PD in the AMPD differs from the ICD-11 as it requires the presence of one or more elevated traits. Nevertheless, there is a growing interest in using only Criterion A for understanding, diagnosing, and managing PD. The FFM has the ability to explain all personality variation, with current dimensional PD models capturing dysfunctional versions or extremes of these traits.

== DSM-5 (section II) ==
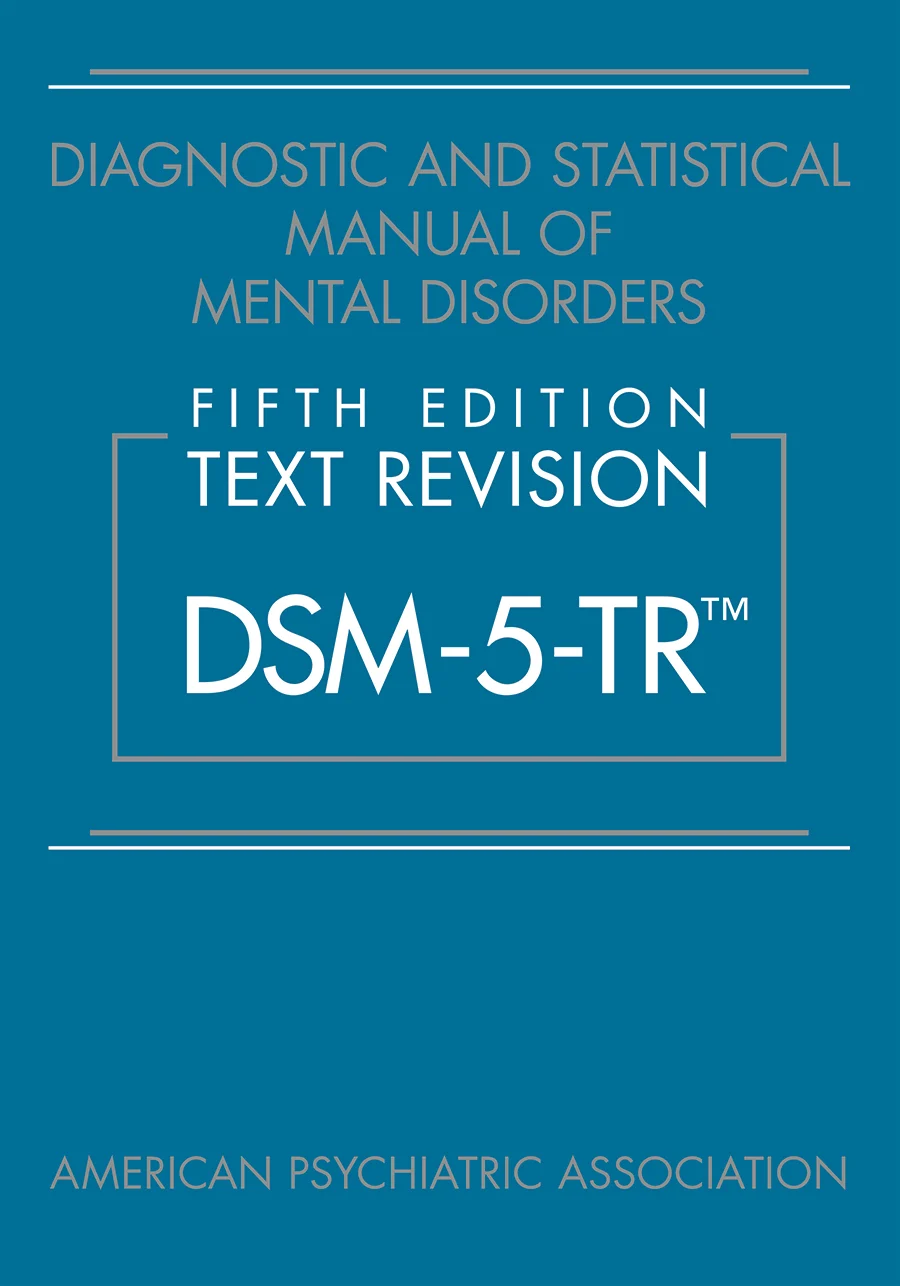
The cover of the latest DSM edition

In the fifth edition of the Diagnostic and Statistical Manual of Mental Disorders, a categorical classification was retained for personality disorders. Located in Section II (Diagnostic Criteria and Codes; where official diagnoses are listed), it contains ten specific personality disorders grouped into three clusters (A, B, and C), as well as three other diagnoses. Thus, it lists personality disorders in the same way as other mental disorders, rather than on a separate "axis", as previously. The clusters are based on descriptive similarity between the disorders they encompass, and it is not proven that they possess clinical utility.

The clusters, as well as definition of personality disorders being done through specific sets of criteria, have been part of the DSM since the DSM-III (1980). The classification system was retained from the DSM-IV (1994) due to the Board of Trustees of the American Psychiatric Association having decided to reject the AMPD. This system was carried forward in the more recent DSM-5-TR.

The DSM-5 and the more recent DSM-5-TR provide a definition and six criteria for general personality disorder. Any of its ten personality disorder diagnoses is subject to this definition, which requires that a differential diagnosis is performed in order to verify that the disturbance is not the result of other mental disorders, medical conditions or substances, and that the disturbance is stable over time and "inflexible and pervasive across a broad range of personal and social situations", having evident continuity since "at least to adolescence or early adulthood". Additionally, disturbance must be evident in regards to at least two of four specified aspects of functioning, namely: cognition, affectivity, interpersonal functioning and impulse control.

=== Cluster A ===
People with these disorders can be paranoid and have difficulty being understood by others, as they often have odd or eccentric modes of speaking and an unwillingness and inability to form and maintain close relationships. Significant evidence suggests a small proportion of people with Cluster A personality disorders, especially schizotypal personality disorder, have the potential to develop schizophrenia and other psychotic disorders. These disorders also have a higher probability of occurring among individuals whose first-degree relatives have either schizophrenia or a Cluster A personality disorder. Importantly, contrary to common belief, a recent meta-analysis shows that diagnosis remission rates and treatment dropout rates in patients with Cluster A personality disorders are not significantly different from those of other personality disorders.

- Paranoid personality disorder (PPD) is characterized by paranoia, and a pervasive, long-standing suspiciousness and generalized mistrust of others.
- Schizoid personality disorder (SzPD or ScPD) is characterized by a lack of interest in social relationships, a tendency toward a solitary or sheltered lifestyle, reservedness, emotional coldness, detachment, and apathy. Affected individuals may be unable to form intimate attachments to others and simultaneously possess a rich and elaborate but exclusively internal fantasy world. Other associated features include stilted speech, a lack of deriving enjoyment from most activities, feeling as though one is an "observer" rather than a participant in life, an intolerance towards meeting emotional expectations of others, apparent indifference when praised or criticized, being on the asexual spectrum, and idiosyncratic moral or political beliefs.
- Schizotypal personality disorder (StPD or SPD) is characterized by thought disorder, paranoia, a characteristic form of social anxiety, derealization, transient psychosis, and unconventional beliefs. People with this disorder often feel pronounced discomfort in forming and maintaining social connections with other people, primarily due to the belief that other people harbor negative thoughts and views about them. People with StPD may react oddly in conversations, such as not responding as expected, or talking to themselves. They frequently interpret situations as being strange or having unusual meanings for them; paranormal and superstitious beliefs are common. Those with the disorder often score high on measures for self-disorder.

=== Cluster B ===
Cluster B personality disorders are characterized by dramatic, impulsive, self-destructive, emotional behavior and sometimes incomprehensible interactions with others.

- Antisocial personality disorder (ASPD) is defined by a chronic pattern of behavior that disregards the rights and well-being of others. People with ASPD often exhibit behavior that conflicts with social norms, leading to issues with interpersonal relationships, employment, and legal matters. The condition generally manifests in childhood or early adolescence, with a high rate of associated conduct problems and a tendency for symptoms to peak in late adolescence and early adulthood.
- Borderline personality disorder (BPD) is characterized by a pervasive, long-term pattern across several contexts of significant interpersonal relationship instability, extreme fear of abandonment, and intense emotional outbursts. People with BPD frequently exhibit self-harming behaviors and engage in risky activities, primarily caused by difficulties in regulating emotions. Symptoms such as dissociation, a pervasive sense of emptiness, and distorted sense of self are prevalent.
- Histrionic personality disorder (HPD) is characterized by a pattern of excessive attention-seeking behaviors, usually beginning in adolescence or early adulthood, including inappropriate seduction and an excessive desire for approval.
- Narcissistic personality disorder (NPD) is characterized by patterns of grandiosity, entitlement, low empathy, and interpersonal difficulties, which can manifest as either grandiose ("thick-skinned") or vulnerable ("thin-skinned") forms. Grandiose individuals display arrogance, social dominance, and exploitative behaviors, while vulnerable individuals show shame, inferiority, hypersensitivity, and extreme reactions to criticism. NPD often involves impaired emotional empathy, superficial relationships, and difficulty tolerating disagreement.

=== Cluster C ===
Cluster C personality disorders are characterised by a consistent pattern of anxious thinking or behavior. Earlier, this cluster has included passive–aggressive personality disorder in the DSM-III-R.

- Avoidant personality disorder (AvPD) is characterized by marked social inhibition and avoidance, accompanied by feelings of inadequacy and a strong sensitivity to rejection or negative evaluation. People with AvPD may therefore avoid social interaction, while at the same time strongly desiring more involvement with other people.
- Dependent personality disorder (DPD) is characterized by a pervasive dependence on other people and subsequent submissiveness and clinginess. This personality disorder is a long-term condition in which people depend on others to meet their emotional and physical needs. Individuals with DPD often struggle to make independent decisions and seek constant reassurance from others. This dependence can result in a tendency to prioritize the needs and opinions of others over their own.
- Obsessive–compulsive personality disorder (OCPD) is marked by a spectrum of obsessions with rules, lists, schedules, and order, among other things. Symptoms are usually present by the time a person reaches adulthood, and are visible in a variety of situations. The cause of OCPD is thought to involve a combination of genetic and environmental factors, namely problems with attachment, but in some individuals there may be a link to brain trauma or Parkinson's disease.

=== Other personality disorders ===
The DSM-5 chapter on personality disorders also contains three diagnoses for conditions not matching these ten disorders, which nevertheless exhibit characteristics of a personality disorder:

- Personality change due to another medical condition – personality disturbance due to the direct effects of a medical condition
- Other specified personality disorder – used when recording the presence of personality disorder along with the reasons for the condition not being classified as one of the specific personality disorders.
- Unspecified personality disorder – used when a patient presents with personality disorder symptoms that cause distress or impairment, but the clinician either chooses not to indicate the specific reason these criteria are not met for any one disorder, or there isn't enough information available to make a more precise diagnosis.

== DSM-5 (section III; AMPD) ==
Located in section III of the DSM-5, the Alternative DSM-5 Model for Personality Disorders (AMPD) is a dimensional–categorical hybrid, yielding diagnoses based on combinations of ratings of impairment in personality functioning (criterion A) and pathological personality traits (criterion B). Created with the aim of ameliorating issues such as arbitrary thresholds and excessive comorbidity, it was intended to replace the categorical model in the at the time upcoming DSM-5; however, upon its rejection, it was instead placed in Section III (Emerging Measures and Models).

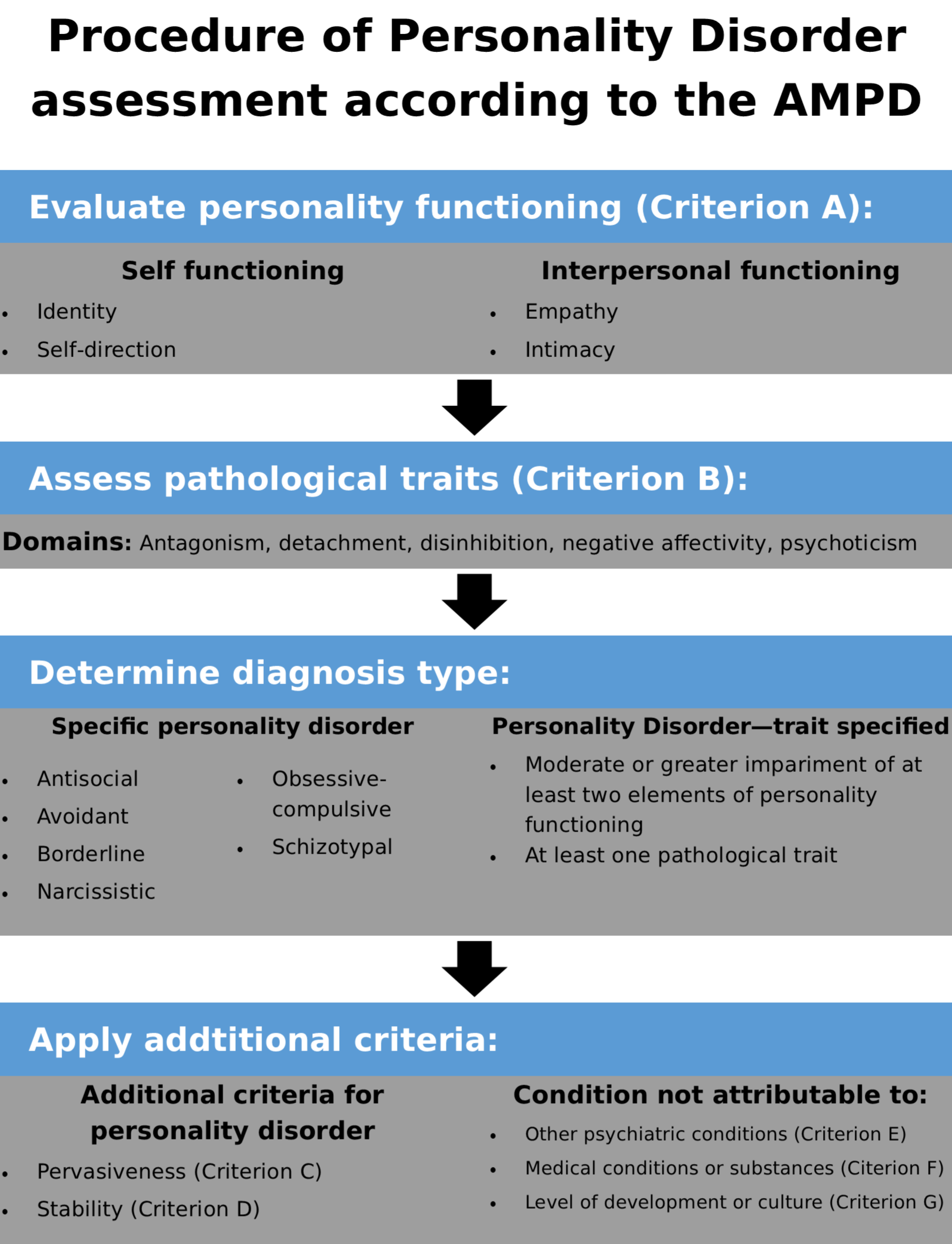
Overview diagram showing the steps of assessing a personality disorder using the AMPD

Assessed across self and interpersonal domains, the level of personality functioning (criterion A) consists of four elements, namely: identity, self-direction, empathy and intimacy; the first two of these constitute self functioning, while the other two comprise interpersonal functioning. Supposed to capture fundamental problems specific and common to personality disorders, the level of functioning is rated on the Level of Personality Functioning Scale (LPFS), which ranges from 0 (little or no impairment) to 4 (extreme impairment). Describing the manner in which the disorder is manifested, criterion B encompasses the assessment of pathological personality traits; these are grouped into the following five domains: Negative Affectivity, Detachment, Antagonism, Disinhibition, and Psychoticism. These domains consist of twenty-five specific trait facets, such as irresponsibility and risk taking within the domain of disinhibition.

Defined by combinations of criteria A and B, available in the AMPD are both six specific personality disorders and a trait specified diagnosis. The six specific ones – based on diagnoses from the categorical system in the DSM-IV – are: antisocial, avoidant, borderline, narcissistic, obsessive-compulsive, and schizotypal; while personality disorder–trait specified is available for presentations differing a lot from the predefined categories. This applies to mixed presentations and categorical diagnoses which were not specifically included in the alternative model. Additional requirements for diagnosis are defined in criteria C–G, which require that the disturbance has affected the individual broadly and continuously since they were young, and that it is not better explained by substances, medical conditions or other mental disorders; nor may it be considered normal for the individual's social environment or developmental stage.

== ICD-11 ==
Example of an ICD-11 severity and trait profile of an individual's personality disorder

Departing from the categorical classification in the ICD-10, the ICD-11 classification of personality disorders implements a dimensional model containing a single personality disorder (6D10), which can be coded as mild, moderate, severe, or severity unspecified. Personality disorder as well as personality difficulty may be further described by qualifiers for five trait domains as well as a borderline pattern, similar to borderline personality disorder; in contrast to the AMPD, no categorical PD types were retained in the ICD-11.

=== Severity levels ===
Once the presence of personality disorder is established, its severity may be determined; classified as mild, moderate, or severe, it is based on how pervasive and disabling the disturbances are. The evaluation considers impairments in several areas of functioning, such as identity and self-direction, interpersonal relationships, emotional and behavioural problems, the extent of psychosocial dysfunction or distress, and risk of harm to self or others. These indicators serve as guidelines for global clinical judgment rather than as fixed diagnostic criteria. Severity may also be coded as unspecified (6D10.Z).

- Mild Personality Disorder (6D10.0): Disturbance is limited to certain aspects of personality functioning. The person may struggle with decisions, relationships, or handling criticism while retaining a coherent identity and overall reality testing. Distress and impairment are present but circumscribed, and harm to self or others is uncommon.
- Moderate Personality Disorder (6D10.1): Disturbance extends across multiple domains, such as self-concept, relationships, and moderation of behaviour, yet some capacities remain intact. Harm to self or others may occur but is typically moderate.
- Severe Personality Disorder (6D10.2): There are profound disturbances in identity and interpersonal functioning. The person may lack a stable sense of self, display rigid or chaotic self-concepts, and experience pervasive conflict or exploitation in relationships. Social and occupational functioning is severely compromised, and significant risk of self-injury or violence is common.

=== Trait and pattern qualifiers ===
In addition to coding severity, clinicians may use trait and pattern qualifiers to describe the specific stylistic dimensions and configurations of personality disturbance. These qualifiers indicate prominent traits contributing to the overall dysfunction but do not represent distinct categories or syndromes. Although the traits exist dimensionally, for coding purposes they are recorded as either present or absent. The combination and number of trait qualifiers typically reflect the individual's global severity, with more complex or numerous traits often accompanying greater impairment.

- Negative Affectivity (6D11.0): Involves a tendency to experience frequent and intense negative emotions, such as anxiety, anger, guilt, or shame, accompanied by impaired emotional self-regulation. Common problems are excessive dependency on others, suicidal ideation and hopelessness.
- Detachment (6D11.1): Characterized by social withdrawal and emotional detachment, anhedonia, and avoidance of intimacy or social engagement.
- Dissociality (6D11.2): Characterized by self-centeredness, lack of empathy, and disregard for the rights and feelings of others. Individuals often display grandiosity, entitlement, and manipulativeness, pursuing their own needs and comfort without concern for others, or expecting attention or admiration from them. Lack of empathy may be manifested in callousness, aggression, and exploitation, and sometimes in taking pleasure in others' suffering.
- Disinhibition (6D11.3): Involves impulsivity, recklessness, and poor self-control, with actions driven by immediate desires without regard for long-term consequences.
- Anankastia (6D11.4): Marked by perfectionism, rigidity, and excessive orderliness, accompanied by a preoccupation with rules, control, and moral standards.
- Borderline Pattern (6D11.5): A pattern qualifier corresponding closely to the DSM-5 borderline personality disorder diagnosis.

== History ==
=== ICD-10 ===
In the ICD-10, personality disorders were grouped as specific or mixed and other. The former grouping (F60) includes the following categories: paranoid, schizoid, dissocial, emotionally unstable (borderline type and impulsive type), histrionic, anankastic, anxious (avoidant) and dependent. Moreover, this group contains other specific personality disorders, which includes PDs characterized as eccentric, haltlose, immature, narcissistic, passive–aggressive, or psychoneurotic; additionally, it contains personality disorder, unspecified, which includes "character neurosis" and "pathological personality".

On the other hand, mixed and other personality disorders (F61) denotes conditions that are often troublesome but do not demonstrate the specific pattern of symptoms that characterize the named disorders. Finally, there is also enduring personality changes, not attributable to brain damage and disease (F62), used for conditions that seem to arise in adults without a diagnosis of personality disorder, following catastrophic or prolonged stress or other psychiatric illness.

== See also ==
- Classification of mental disorders

== Sources ==
- * American Psychiatric Association (2013). Diagnostic and Statistical Manual of Mental Disorders (5th ed.). American Psychiatric Publishing. ISBN 978-0-89042-555-8.
