= Dangerous and severe personality disorder =

UK policy term, used from 1999 to 2013

Dangerous and Severe Personality Disorder (DSPD) is a former categorization of personality disorder which manifests in a manner which poses a significant risk of serious crime and harm to others. It is not, and has never been, a clinical diagnosis; rather it was used in policy for categorizing dangerous individuals who should not be released, but were at the same time not treatable under the Mental Health Act 1983. DSPD was used in the United Kingdom, where the concept had been introduced in 1999 by the UK Home Office and Department of Health. The programme was launched in 2001, and it continued until 2013.

The introduction of the DSPD programme was inspired by Michael Stone's murder of Lin and Megan Russel, as the murderer had been known to suffer from antisocial personality disorder, but was however not being treated due to lack of belief in his treatability. This led to calls for reform, so that individuals with severe personality disorders could be detained regardless of whether or not they were considered treatable or whether or not they had committed a crime.

DSPD gave rise to controversy, as it was viewed as an unethical justification for preventative detention, resulting in "major concerns about civil liberties". In addition, DSPD was criticised for being grounded in politics rather than in psychiatry.

== See also ==
- Classification of personality disorders
- Malignant narcissism
- Psychopathy
- Severe personality disorder
