= Disinhibition =

Lack of restraint

Disinhibition, also referred to as behavioral disinhibition, is medically recognized as an orientation towards immediate gratification, leading to impulsive behavior driven by current thoughts, feelings, and external stimuli, without regard for past learning or consideration for future consequences. It is one of five pathological personality trait domains in certain psychiatric disorders. In psychology, it is defined as a lack of restraint manifested in disregard of social conventions, impulsivity, and poor risk assessment. Hypersexuality, hyperphagia, substance abuse, money mismanagement, frequent faux pas, and aggressive outbursts are indicative of disinhibited instinctual drives.

Certain psychoactive substances that have effects on the limbic system of the brain may induce disinhibition.

== Clinical concept ==
Disinhibition in psychology is defined as a lack of inhibitory control manifested in several ways, affecting motor, instinctual, emotional, cognitive, and perceptual aspects with signs and symptoms, such as impulsivity, disregard for others and social norms, aggressive outbursts, misconduct, and oppositional behaviors, disinhibited instinctual drives including risk-taking behaviors and hypersexuality.

=== Brain injury ===
Disinhibition is a common symptom following brain injury, or lesions, particularly to the frontal lobe and primarily to the orbitofrontal cortex. The neuropsychiatric sequelae following brain injuries could include diffuse cognitive impairment, with more prominent deficits in the rate of information processing, attention, memory, cognitive flexibility, and problem-solving. Prominent impulsivity, affective instability, and disinhibition are seen frequently, secondary to injury to frontal, temporal, and limbic areas. In association with the typical cognitive deficits, these sequelae characterize the frequently noted "personality changes" in TBI (Traumatic Brain Injury) patients.

Disinhibition syndromes, in brain injuries and insults including brain tumors, strokes and epilepsy range from mildly inappropriate social behavior, and lack of control over one's behavior to the full-blown mania, depending on the lesions to specific brain regions. The previous several studies in brain traumas and insults have demonstrated significant associations between disinhibition syndromes and dysfunction of orbitofrontal and basotemporal cortices, affecting visuospatial functions, somatosensation, spatial memory, motoric, instinctive, affective, and intellectual behaviors.

=== Psychiatric disorder ===
Disinhibition syndromes have also been reported with mania-like manifestations in old age with lesions to the orbitofrontal and basotemporal cortex involving limbic and frontal connections (orbitofrontal circuit), especially in the right hemisphere. Behavioral disinhibition as a result of damage to frontal lobe could be seen as a result of consumption of alcohol and other central nervous system (CNS) depressants (e.g., benzodiazepines that disinhibit the frontal cortex from self-regulation and control). It has also been argued that the hyperactive/impulsive subtype of attention deficit hyperactivity disorder (ADHD) has a general behavioral disinhibition beyond impulsivity and many morbidities or complications of ADHD (e.g., conduct disorder, antisocial personality disorder, substance abuse, and risk-taking behaviors are all consequences of untreated behavioral disinhibition).

==== Personality disorder trait domain ====
Disinhibition is a pathological trait domain in two prominent dimensional models of personality disorders, namely the Alternative DSM-5 model for personality disorders and the ICD-11 classification of personality disorders. In the former, it is part of predefined specific personality disorders and can also be used for construction of a personality disorder–trait specified diagnosis. In the ICD-11 system, a unified personality disorder is instead classified by severity, with there also being a personality difficulty diagnosis for subclinical presentations. These diagnoses may be further specified by a qualifier, such as disinhibition in personality disorder or personality difficulty.

== Substance-induced disinhibition ==
Certain psychoactive substances that have effects on the limbic system of the brain may induce disinhibition. It is commonly induced by GABAergic depressants such as alcohol, and benzodiazepines.

== Treatment approaches ==
Positive Behavior Support (PBS) is a treatment approach that looks at the best way to work with each individual with disabilities. In this treatment, a behavioral therapist conducts a functional analysis of behavior which helps to determine ways to improve the quality of life for the person, rather than trying only to lessen problematic behavior. Furthermore, PBS relies on the belief in humans' ability to change, and it is most commonly applied to resolving problems in educational settings. There are two main objectives: reacting situationally when the behavior occurs, and then acting proactively to prevent the behavior from occurring.

=== Reactive ===
Reactive strategies include:

- Redirection: This strategy can be employed by distracting the person by offering another activity, or changing the topic of conversation. In addition, offer the person a choice of 2 or 3 things, but no more than 3, because this can be overwhelming. In offering a choice, make sure to pause to allow the person time to process the information and give a response.
- Talking to the person and finding out what the problem is.
- Working out what the person's behavior is trying to communicate.
- Employing crisis management tactic.

=== Proactive ===
Proactive strategies to prevent problems can include:

- Changing the environment: This can include increasing opportunities for access to a variety of activities, balancing cognitively and physically demanding activities with periods of rest, providing a predictable environment in order to reduce the level of cognitive demands on the person, trying to provide consistent routines (be mindful of events that may not occur, try not to make promises that cannot be kept, if unable to go out at a particular time then say so), checking for safety in the home environment (e.g., changing/moving furniture).
- Teaching a skill: This can include general skills development of useful communication strategies, coping skills (e.g., teach the person what to do when feeling angry, anxious).
- Individual behavior support plans: These involve reinforcing specific desirable behavior and ignoring the specific undesirable behavior (unless it is dangerous, the priority is to keep both people safe through a crisis plan which might involve removing sharp objects or weapons, escaping to a safe place, giving the person time to calm down), avoiding things you know upsets the person, strategies to increase engagement in activities.

== See also ==
- Boldness
- Frontotemporal dementia
- Online disinhibition effect
- Orbitofrontal cortex
- Spendthrift

== Bibliography ==
- Diagnostic and Statistical Manual of Mental Disorders, Fifth Edition (DSM-5). United States: American Psychiatric Association. 2013. ISBN 978-0-89042-554-1. OCLC 830807378.
- Bone, Alyson (January 1998). "Drug-Induced Behavioural Disinhibition". Molecular Diagnosis & Therapy. 9: 41–57. doi:10.2165/00023210-199809010-00005.
