= Structured Clinical Interview for DSM =

Psychiatric diagnostic interview protocol

- Synonyms: SCID
- Purpose: determine major DSM disorders
- Based on: Diagnostic and Statistical Manual of Mental Disorders

The Structured Clinical Interview for DSM (SCID) is a semi-structured interview guide for making diagnoses according to the diagnostic criteria published in the Diagnostic and Statistical Manual of Mental Disorders (DSM). The development of SCID has followed the evolution of the DSM and multiple versions are available for a single edition covering different categories of mental disorders. The first SCID (for DSM-III-R) was released in 1989, SCID-IV (for DSM-IV) was published in 1994 and the current version, SCID-5 (for DSM-5), is available since 2015.

It is administered by a clinician or trained mental health professional who is familiar with the DSM classification and diagnostic criteria. The interview subjects may be either psychiatric or general medical patients or individuals who do not identify themselves as patients, such as participants in a community survey of mental illness or family members of psychiatric patients. SCID users should have had sufficient clinical experience to be able to perform diagnostic evaluation, however, nonclinicians who have comprehensive diagnostic experience with a particular study population may be trained to administer the SCID. Generally additional training is required for individuals with less clinical experience.

== DSM-III editions ==
The SCID for the DSM-III-R helped determine Axis I (SCID-I) and Axis II disorders (SCID-II). Separate versions were used to assess psychiatric patients (SCID-P) and to study non-patient populations (SCID-NP). Another form of the SCID-P, SCID-P W/PSY SCREEN, was developed for patients in which psychotic disorders were expected to be rare and only included screening questions for these disorders but not the complex module. Special versions were also created for studying panic disorder, assessing PTSD and combat experience in Vietnam veterans and studying the social and psychiatric consequences of HIV infection.

The reliability and validity of the SCID for DSM-III-R has been reported in several published studies. With regard to reliability, the range in reliability is enormous, depending on the type of the sample and research methodology (i.e., joint vs. test-retest, multi-site vs. single site with raters who have worked together, etc.)

== SCID-D ==
The Structured Clinical Interview for DSM-IV Dissociative Disorders (SCID-D) is used to diagnose dissociative disorders, especially in research settings. It was originally designed for the DSM-III-R but early access to DSM-IV criteria for dissociative disorders allowed them to be incorporated into the SCID-D.

For subjects with non-dissociative disorders administration takes between 30 minutes and 1.5 hours. Subjects with dissociative disorders usually require between 40 minutes to 2.5 hours. These subjects should be given enough time to describe their experiences fully.

The SCID-D has been translated into Dutch and Turkish and is used in the Netherlands and Turkey.

== DSM-IV editions ==
SCID for DSM-IV also follows the multi-axial system, SCID-I for Axis I disorders (major mental disorders) and SCID-II for Axis II disorders (personality disorders).

There are several variants of SCID-I addressed to different audiences. Similarly to the previous edition SCID-I is available for examining psychiatric patients (SCID-I/P) and studying non-patients (SCID-I/NP) and patient populations where psychotic disorders are not expected (SCID-I/P W/ PSY SCREEN). Specific version for clinicians (SCID-CV) and clinical trials (SCID-CT) were also developed. The SCID-II for DSM-IV comes in a single edition.

A variant of the tool (KID-SCID) was developed at York University for generating childhood DSM-IV diagnoses for clinical research studies. In 2015 a study evaluated the psychometric properties of the KID-SCID in a Dutch sample of children and adolescents which later led to the creation of SCID-5-Junior for the DSM-5 (see below).

An Axis I SCID assessment with a psychiatric patient usually takes between 1 and 2 hours, depending on the complexity of the subject's psychiatric history and their ability to clearly describe episodes of current and past symptoms. A SCID with a non-psychiatric patient takes 1/2 hour to 1 1/2 hours. A SCID-II personality assessment takes about 1/2 to 1 hour.

There are at least 700 published studies in which the SCID was the diagnostic instrument used. Major parts of the SCID have been translated into other languages, including Danish, French, German, Greek, Hebrew, Italian, Portuguese, Spanish, Swedish, Turkish, and Zulu.

== DSM-5 editions ==
SCID-5-RV (Research Version) is the most comprehensive version of the SCID-5. It contains more disorders and includes all of the relevant subtypes and severity and course specifiers. An important feature is its customizability, allowing the instrument to be tailored to meet the requirements of a particular study. SCID-5-CV (Clinician Version) is a reformatted version of the SCID-5-RV for use by clinicians. It covers the most common diagnoses seen in clinical settings. Despite the "clinician" designation, it can be used in research as long as the disorders of interest are among those included in this version. SCID-5-CT (Clinical Trials version) is an adaptation of the SCID-5-RV that has been optimized for use in clinical trials.

SCID-5-PD (Personality Disorders version) is used to evaluate the 10 personality disorders. Its name reflects the elimination of the multiaxial system of the SCID-IV. The SCID-5-AMPD (Alternative DSM-5 Model for Personality Disorders) provides dimensional and categorical approaches to personality disorders. Designed for trained clinicians, the modular format allows the researcher or clinician to focus on those aspects of the Alternative Model of most interest.

Various versions of the SCID-5 have been translated to Chinese, Danish, Dutch, German, Greek, Hungarian, Italian, Japanese, Korean, Norwegian, Polish, Portuguese, Romanian, Spanish, Turkish.

As a result of earlier studies conducted on Dutch youth a variant of the tool, SCID-5-Junior, a revision of the KID-SCID, is available in Dutch. There are plans to create a more widely available version for children and adolescents.

=== Electronic versions ===
The NetSCID-5 is an online version of the SCID-5, developed and marketed in consultation with the SCID-5 authors by TeleSage, Inc. in Chapel Hill, North Carolina. NetSCID-5 is offered as an online service with user accounts and payment per-administration. Diagnoses and response data are made available in the form of reports and raw data download. TeleSage currently offers the NetSCID-5 in Research, Clinician, and Personality Disorders versions. The content (e.g. text, branching and scoring) of each of these instruments is intended to match the corresponding paper version. Initial development was funded by a grant from the National Institute of Mental Health. Public availability was announced June 30, 2017.

An electronic versions of the SCID-5 instrument is also offered with eInterview from Sunilion Software

Computerized versions of mental health interviews has been suggested by some research to result in fewer branching and scoring errors compared to pencil-and-paper versions of the same instruments.
