= Personality Inventory for DSM-5 =

Psychological assessment

The Personality Inventory for DSM-5 (PID-5) is an instrument for operationalization of pathological personality traits (criterion B) of the Alternative DSM-5 Model for Personality Disorders (AMPD). Criterion B entails assessment of five trait domains, consisting of 25 trait facets; the PID-5 operationalizes these through 220 items.

== See also ==
- Personality disorder
- Dimensional models of personality disorders
- Classification of personality disorders
- Diagnostic and Statistical Manual of Mental Disorders, fifth edition (DSM-5)
- Big Five personality traits
