= Revised NEO Personality Inventory =

Big Five personality trait inventory

The Revised NEO Personality Inventory (NEO PI-R) is a personality inventory that assesses an individual on five dimensions of personality. These are the same dimensions found in the Big Five personality traits. These traits are openness to experience, conscientiousness, extraversion (-introversion), agreeableness, and neuroticism. In addition, the NEO PI-R also reports on six subcategories of each Big Five personality trait (called facets).

Historically, development of the Revised NEO PI-R began in 1978 when Paul Costa and Robert McCrae published a personality inventory. The researchers later published three updated versions of their personality inventory in 1985, 1992, and 2005. These were called the NEO PI (Neuroticism, Extraversion, Openness Personality Inventory), NEO PI-R (or Revised NEO PI), and NEO PI-3, respectively. The revised inventories feature updated vocabulary that could be understood by adults of any education level, as well as children.

The inventories have both longer and shorter versions, with the full NEO PI-R consisting of 240 items and providing detailed facet scores. By contrast, the shorter NEO-FFI (NEO Five-Factor Inventory) comprised 60 items (12 per trait). The test was originally developed for use with adult men and women without overt psychopathology. It has also been found to be valid for use with children.

== Personality dimensions ==
A table of the personality dimensions measured by the NEO PI-R, including facets, is as follows:

Neuroticism	Extraversion	Openness to experience	Agreeableness	Conscientiousness
Anxiety	Warmth	Fantasy/ Imagination/	Trust (in Others)	Competence/ Self-efficacy/
Hostility/ Anger/	Gregariousness	Aesthetics/ Artistic Interest/	Straightforwardness/ Morality/	Order(liness)/ Organizing
Depression	Assertiveness	Feelings/ Emotionality	Altruism	Dutifulness/ Sense of Duty/Obligation
Self-consciousness	Activity (Level)/ Lively Temperament	Actions/ Adventurousness/Exploration	Compliance/ Cooperation	Achievement Striving
Impulsiveness/ Immoderation	Excitement Seeking	Ideas/ Intellectual Interest/Curiosity	Modesty	Self-Discipline/ Willpower
Vulnerability to Stress/ Fear/Learned helplessness	Positive Emotion/ Cheerfulness/Vivacity	Values/ Psychological liberalism/Tolerance to ambiguity	Tendermindedness/ Sympathy	Deliberation/ Cautiousness

== Forms and administration ==
In the most recent publication, there are two forms for the NEO, self-report (form S) and observer-report (form R) versions. Both forms consist of 240 items (descriptions of behavior) answered on a five-point Likert scale. Finally, there is a 60-item inventory, the NEO FFI. There are paper and computer versions of both forms.

The manual reports that administration of the full version should take between 30 and 40 minutes. Costa and McCrae reported that an individual should not be evaluated if more than 40 items are missing. They also state that despite the fact that the assessment is "balanced" to control for the effects of acquiescence and nay-saying, that if more than 150 responses, or fewer than 50 responses, are "agree" or "strongly agree", the results should be interpreted with caution.

Scores can be reported to most test-takers on "Your NEO Summary", which provides a brief explanation of the assessment, and gives the individuals domain levels and a strengths-based description of three levels (high, medium, and low) in each domain. For example, low N reads "Secure, hardy, and generally relaxed even under stressful conditions," whereas high N reads "Sensitive, emotional, and prone to experience feelings that are upsetting." For profile interpretation, facet and domain scores are reported in T scores and are recorded visually as compared to the appropriate norming group.

== Reliability ==
The internal consistency of the NEO scales was assessed on 1,539 individuals. The internal consistency of the NEO PI-R was high, at: N = .92, E = .89, O = .87, A = .86, C = .90. The internal consistency of the facet scales ranged from .56 to .81. The internal consistency of the NEO PI-3 was consistent with that of the NEO PI-R, with α ranging from .89 to .93 for the five domains. Internal consistency coefficient from the facets, with each facet scale comprising fewer items than each of the Big Five scales, were necessarily smaller, ranging from .54 to .83.

For the NEO FFI (the 60 item domain only version) the internal consistencies reported in the manual were: N = .79, E = .79, O = .80, A = .75, C = .83. In the literature, the NEO FFI is used more often, with investigators using the NEO PI-R usually using the items from just the domains they are interested in. Sherry et al. (2007) found internal consistencies for the FFI to be as follows: N = .85, E = .80, O = .68, A = .75, C = .83.

The NEO has been translated into many languages. The internal consistency coefficients of the domain scores of a translation of the NEO that has been used in the Philippines are satisfactory. The alphas for the domain scores range from .78 to .90, with facet alphas having a median of .61. Observer-ratings NEO PI-R data from 49 cultures was used as criterion in a recent study which tested whether individuals' perceptions of the "national character" of a culture accurately reflected the personality of the members of that culture (it did not).

The test-retest reliability of the NEO PI-R has also been found to be satisfactory. The test-retest reliability of an early version of the NEO after 3 months was: N = .87, E = .91, O = .86. The test-retest reliability for over 6 years, as reported in the NEO PI-R manual, was the following: N = .83, E = .82, O = .83, A = .63, C = .79. Costa and McCrae pointed out that these findings not only demonstrate good reliability of the domain scores, but also their stability (among individuals over the age of 30). Scores measured six years apart varied only marginally more than scores measured a few months apart.

The psychometric properties of NEO PI-R scales have been found to generalize across ages, cultures, and methods of measurement.

== Effect of age ==
Although individual differences (rank-order) tend to be relatively stable in adulthood, there are maturational changes in personality that are common to most people (mean-level changes). Most cross-sectional and longitudinal studies suggest that neuroticism, extraversion, and openness tend to decline, whereas agreeableness and conscientiousness tend to increase during adulthood. A meta-analysis of 92 personality studies that used several different inventories (among them NEO PI-R) found that social dominance, conscientiousness, and emotional stability increased with age, especially in the age span of 20 to 40.

== Validity ==
Costa and McCrae reported in the NEO manual research findings regarding the convergent and discriminant validity of the inventory. Examples of these findings include the following:

- For the Myers-Briggs Type Indicator, Introversion is correlated with the NEO facet Warmth at −0.61, and with the NEO facet Gregariousness at −0.59. Intuition is correlated with the NEO facet Fantasy at 0.43 and with the NEO facet Aesthetics at 0.56. Feeling is correlated with the NEO facet Tender-mindedness at 0.39.
- For the Self-Directed Search (a personality inventory developed by John L. Holland for careers work), Artistic is correlated with the NEO facet Aesthetic at 0.56, Investigative is correlated with the NEO facet Ideas at 0.43, and Social is correlated with the NEO facet Tender-mindedness at 0.36.

A number of studies evaluated the criterion validity of the NEO. For example, Conard (2005) found that Conscientiousness significantly predicted the GPA of college students, over and above using SAT scores alone. In a study conducted in Seville, Spain, Cano-Garcia and his colleagues (2005) found that, using a Spanish version of the inventory, dimensions of the NEO correlated with teacher burnout. Neuroticism was related to the "emotional exhaustion" dimension of burnout, and Agreeableness, with the "personal accomplishment" burnout dimension. Finally, Korukonda (2007) found that Neuroticism was positively related to computer anxiety; Openness and Agreeableness were negatively related to computer anxiety.

== Translations ==
The NEO-PI-R has been extensively used across cultures. Per the information on the Psychological Assessment Resources (PAR) website (PAR is the publisher of the NEO-PI-R), the NEO-PI-R has been translated into 40 languages. These languages are Afrikaans, Albanian, Arabic, Bulgarian, Chinese, Croatian, Estonian, Filipino, Finnish, Hebrew, Hindi, Hmong, Hungarian, Icelandic, Indonesian, Italian, Japanese, Kannada, Korean, Latvian, Lithuanian, Malay, Marathi, Persian, Peruvian, Polish, Portuguese, Romanian, Russian, Serbian, Slovene, Sotho, Spanish, Taiwanese, Thai, Tigrignan, Turkish, Urdu, Vietnamese, and Xhosa.

== Critiques ==
Critical reviews of the NEO PI-R were published in the 12th edition of the Mental Measurements Yearbook (MMY). The NEO-Pi-R (which only measures 57% of the known trait variance in the normal personality sphere alone) has been severely criticized both in terms of its factor analytic/construct validity and its psychometric properties. Widiger criticized the NEO for not controlling for social desirability bias. He argued that test developers cannot assume participants will be honest, especially in settings where it benefits people to present themselves in a better light (e.g., forensic or personnel settings). Ben-Porath and Waller pointed out that the NEO Inventories could be improved with the addition of controls for dishonesty and social desirability.

Juni, in another review of the NEO PI-R for the MMY, praised the NEO PI-R for including both self- and other-report scales, making it easier for psychologists to corroborate information provided by a client or research participant. Juni criticized the NEO PI-R for its conceptualization using the Five Factor Model (FFM) of personality. Juni argued that the existence of the FFM was phenomenological and atheoretical, the model gaining popularity as a result of the influence of the authors (McCrae and Costa) in the psychological community. The NEO PI-R has also been criticized because of its market-oriented, proprietary nature. In response to the expense involved in using proprietary personality inventories such as the NEO, other researchers have contributed to the development of the International Personality Item Pool (IPIP); IPIP items and scales are available free of charge.

NEO PI-R was also criticised for being possibly too complex to understand for less educated or less intelligent individuals.

== Alternative versions ==
A shortened version of NEO PI-R has been published. The shortened version is the NEO Five-Factor Inventory (NEO-FFI). It comprises 60 items and is designed to take 10 to 15 minutes to complete; by contrast, the NEO PI-R takes 45 to 60 minutes to complete. The NEO-FFI was revised in 2004. With the publication of the NEO PI-3 in 2005, a revised version of the NEO-FFI was also published. The revision of the NEO-FFI involved the replacement of 15 of the 60 items. The revised edition is thought to be more suitable for younger individuals. The new version had a stronger factor structure and increased reliability.

Public domain inventories that correlate well with NEO PI-R have been published using items from the International Personality Item Pool and are collectively known as the "IPIP-NEO". Lewis Goldberg published a 300-question version of the 30-facet scale in 1999. John Johnson and Maples et al. have developed a few 120-question versions based on IPIP questions.

Very short (5 items each) IPIP-based analogues to the NEO PI-R scales are also part of the Analog for Multiple Broadband Inventories, an inventory designed to approximate a large number of different personality scales with a minimal number of items.

== Cross-cultural research ==
Evidence of the NEO scales' stability in different countries and cultures can be considered evidence of its validity. A great deal of cross-cultural research has been carried out on the Five-Factor Model of Personality. Much of the research has relied on the NEO PI-R and the shorter NEO-FFI. McCrae and Allik (2002) edited a book consisting of papers bearing on cross-cultural research on the FFM. Research from China, Estonia, Finland, the Philippines, France, German-speaking countries, India, Portugal, Russia, South Korea, Turkey, Vietnam, and Zimbabwe have shown the FFM to be robust across cultures.

Rolland, on the basis of the data from a number of countries, asserted that the neuroticism, openness, and conscientiousness dimensions are cross-culturally valid. Rolland further advanced the view that the extraversion and agreeableness dimensions are more sensitive to cultural context. Age differences in the five-factors of personality across the adult life span are parallel in samples from Germany, Italy, Portugal, Croatia, and South Korea. Data examined from many countries have shown that the age and gender differences in those countries resembled differences found in U.S. samples. An intercultural factor analysis yielded a close approximation to the five-factor model.

McCrae, Terracciano et al. (2005) further reported data from 51 cultures. Their study found a cross-cultural equivalency between NEO PI-R five factors and facets.

With the recent development of the NEO PI-3, cross-cultural research will likely begin to compare the newer version with the NEO PI-R. Piedmont and Braganza (2015) compared the NEO PI-R to the NEO PI-3 using an adult sample from India. They used an English version of the NEO PI-3 in order to measure its utility in individuals who speak English as a second language. Piedmont and Braganza found that the NEO PI-3 had slightly higher item/total correlations and better test-retest reliability than the NEO PI-R. They suggested that the NEO PI-3 has the potential to be utilized with those who do not speak English as their first language.

== Brain and genetics ==
The NEO PI-R has been used in research pertaining to both (a) genotype and personality and (b) brain and personality. Such studies have not always been conclusive. For example, one study found some evidence for an association between NEO PI-R facets and polymorphism in the tyrosine hydroxylase gene, while another study could not confirm the finding.

In a study published in Science, Lesch et al. (1996) found a relationship between the serotonin transporter gene regulatory region (5-HTTLPR) and the neuroticism subscale. Individuals with a shorter allele had higher neuroticism scores than individuals with the longer allele. The effect was significant for heterozygotes and even stronger for people homozygous for the shorter allele. Although the finding is important, this specific gene contributes to only 4% of the phenotypic variation in neuroticism. The authors concluded that "if other genes were hypothesized to contribute similar gene dosage effects to anxiety, approximately 10 to 15 genes might be predicted to be involved."

== See also ==
- Psychological testing
- Psychometrics
- Minnesota Multiphasic Personality Inventory
- 16PF Questionnaire
- Synthetic Aperture Personality Assessment
- Dimensional models of personality disorders
- Alternative DSM-5 model for personality disorders
- ICD-11 classification of personality disorders
