= ICD-11 classification of personality disorders =

Dimensional classification system for personality disorders

The ICD-11 classification of personality disorders, introduced in the 11th revision of the International Classification of Diseases (ICD-11), is an implementation of a dimensional model for classification of personality disorders. This means that individuals are assessed along continuous trait dimensions, with personality disorders reflecting extreme or maladaptive variants of traits that are continuous with normal personality functioning, and classified according to both severity of dysfunction and prominent trait domain specifiers. The ICD-11 classification of personality disorders differs substantially from the one in the previous edition, ICD-10; all distinct PDs have been merged into one: personality disorder, which can be coded as mild, moderate, severe, or severity unspecified.

Severity is determined by the level of distress experienced and degree of impairment in day-to-day activities as a result of difficulties in aspects of self-functioning, (e.g., identity, self-worth and agency) and interpersonal relationships (e.g., desire and ability for close relationships and ability to handle conflicts), as well as behavioral, cognitive, and emotional dysfunctions. There is also an additional category called personality difficulty, which can be used to describe personality traits that are problematic, but do not meet the diagnostic criteria for a PD. A personality disorder or difficulty can be specified by one or more of the following prominent personality traits or patterns: Negative affectivity, Detachment, Dissociality, Disinhibition, and Anankastia. In addition to the traits, a Borderline pattern – similar in nature to borderline personality disorder – may be specified.

== Background ==
Described as a clinical equivalent to the Big Five model, the five-trait system addresses several problems of the old category-based system. Of the ten PDs in the ICD-10, two were used with a disproportionate high frequency: emotionally unstable personality disorder, borderline type (F60.3) and dissocial (antisocial) personality disorder (F60.2). (Note: The ICD has never featured the category narcissistic personality disorder (NPD), unlike the DSM, which has it since DSM-III and codes it under the ICD-category Other specific personality disorders (ICD-9: 301.8; ICD-10: F60.8). Patients who might have NPD are sometimes also diagnosed with Dissocial/Antisocial personality disorder (ICD-9: 301.7; ICD-10: F60.2).) Many categories overlapped, and individuals with severe disorders often met the requirements for multiple PDs, which Reed et al. described as "artificial comorbidity". PD was therefore reconceptualized in terms of a general dimension of severity, focusing on five negative personality traits which a person can have to various degrees.

Mapping of ICD-11 PD classification to the Alternative DSM-5 Model for Personality Disorders
ICD-11 Severity of Personality Dysfunction	DSM-5 Criterion A: level of personality functioning
None	No impairment (0)
Personality difficulty	Mild impairment (1)
Mild personality disorder	Moderate impairment (2)
Moderate personality disorder	Severe impairment (3)
Severe personality disorder	Extreme impairment (4)
ICD-11 trait domain qualifiers	DSM-5 Criterion B: Trait domains
Negative affectivity	Negative Affectivity
Detachment	Detachment
Disinhibition	Disinhibition
Dissociality	Antagonism
Anankastia	(Rigid perfectionism) (Note: Conceptualized as low level of Disinhibition in the AMPD.)
(Schizotypal disorder)	Psychoticism

There was considerable debate regarding this new dimensional model, with many believing that categorical diagnosing should not be abandoned. In particular, there was disagreement about the status of borderline personality disorder. Geoffrey Reed wrote: "Some research suggests that borderline PD is not an independently valid category, but rather a heterogeneous marker for PD severity. Other researchers view borderline PD as a valid and distinct clinical entity, and claim that 50 years of research support the validity of the category. Many – though by no means all – clinicians appear to be aligned with the latter position. In the absence of more definitive data, there seemed to be little hope of accommodating these opposing views. However, the WHO took seriously the concerns being expressed that access to services for patients with borderline PD, which has increasingly been achieved in some countries based on arguments of treatment efficacy, might be seriously undermined." Thus, the WHO believed the inclusion of a borderline pattern category to be a "pragmatic compromise".

The Alternative DSM-5 Model for Personality Disorders (AMPD) included near the end of the DSM-5 is similar to the PD-system of the ICD-11. It was considered for inclusion in the ICD-11, but the WHO decided against it because it was considered "too complicated for implementation in most clinical settings around the world", since an explicit aim of the WHO was to develop a simple and efficient method that could also be used in low-resource settings. Research has found that the PD system of the ICD-11 aligns well with the AMPD, meaning that AMPD-related research findings are also possible to apply to the model used in the ICD-11. While there has been a limited amount of research conducted on the utility of the ICD-11 system for PD classification, studies have found favorable results.

== Personality disorder ==
After establishing the presence of Personality Disorder (6D10), a practitioner may determine whether the patient’s level of personality problems overall corresponds to a Mild Personality Disorder, a Moderate Personality Disorder, or a Severe Personality Disorder. Severity is determined by the degree and pervasiveness of disturbance in the person’s relationships and their sense of self; the intensity and breadth of the emotional, cognitive and behavioural manifestations of the person’s disturbance; the extent to which these patterns and problems cause distress or psychosocial impairment; and the level of risk of harm to self and others. For example, some patients’ sense of self may only be contradictory or inconsistent (Mild Personality Disorder), while other patients have a highly unstable or internally contradictory sense of self (Severe Personality Disorder).

Likewise, the patient’s situational and interpersonal appraisals may in certain cases involve some distortions but with intact reality testing (i.e., Mild Personality Disorder), while other patients experience extreme distortions under stress, often including dissociative states or psychotic-like perceptions and interpretations (i.e., Severe Personality Disorder). The ICD-11 classification of PD severity also incorporates harm to self and others, where patients with milder PD cause no significant harm while patients with severe PD often cause severe harm (e.g., repetitive self-injurious or aggressive behaviors).

The ICD-11 provides a list of essential features for each of the three categories of severity (i.e., mild, moderate, severe), which are accompanied by a list of examples that may guide practitioners in their decision-making. These features and examples are not supposed to be used as diagnostic “criteria”; they should only be used as guidelines for a more global evaluation.

Personality disorder can also be coded as severity unspecified (6D10.Z).

=== Mild personality disorder ===
In mild personality disorder (6D10.0), only some areas of personality functioning are affected. For example, a person might have difficulty making decisions or deciding on the direction of their career yet have a strong sense of self-worth and identity. Problems in many interpersonal relationships or in the performance of social and occupational roles are evident but some relationships are maintained or social roles carried out. The manifestations of a person’s difficulties are generally mild and not typically associated with harm to the self or others. For example, they may struggle to recover from minor setbacks or criticisms when stressed or they may distort how they perceive situations or other people’s motives without losing total contact with reality. Whilst the personality disturbance may be mild, the person may still experience substantial distress and impairment. The distress and impairment are limited to a narrower range of functioning or, if the difficulties span many areas, the difficulties are less intense.

=== Moderate personality disorder ===
For moderate personality disorder (6D10.1), disturbance affects multiple areas of personality functioning such as identity, sense of self, formation and maintenance of intimate relationships, and capacity to control and moderate behaviour. Despite these difficulties, some areas of functioning may be relatively less affected. Occasionally, moderate personality disorder is associated with harm to self or others. When this is present, typically, it will be of moderate severity.

=== Severe personality disorder ===
People with severe personality disorder (6D10.2) have major disturbances in their sense of self functioning. For example, they may have no sense of who they are, experience intense numbness, or report that their beliefs and thoughts change dramatically from one context to another. Some individuals may have a very rigid view of themselves and the world and have very regimented routines and approaches to situations. The sense of self may be grandiose or highly eccentric or characterized by disgust and self-contempt.

Virtually all relationships in all contexts are adversely affected. Often, relationships are very one-sided, unstable or highly conflictual. There may even be a degree of physical violence. Family relationships are likely to be severely limited or highly conflictual. The person’s ability, and sometimes willingness, to fulfil social and occupational roles is severely impaired; for example, they may be unwilling or unable to sustain regular work as a result of lack of interest, or effort, or poor performance. Alternatively, the poor work performance may derive from interpersonal difficulties or inappropriate behaviour such as angry outbursts or insubordination. Severe personality disorder is often associated with harm to the person or other people. Severe impairment is evident in all areas of the person’s life.

== Personality difficulty ==
In addition to the personality disorder diagnosis, there is an option to assign a sub-diagnostic code for the presence of personality difficulty (QE50.7). While not a disorder per se, it is available as a code to inform treatment and preventive care, and is located in the section of the ICD-11 classification for non-disease entities that constitute factors influencing health status and encounters with health services. Thus, personality difficulty can be compared to the ICD-10 non-disorder codes for “accentuation of personality traits” (Z73.1) or “borderline intellectual functioning” (R41.83).

Like a personality disorder diagnosis, personality difficulty is characterized by relatively stable difficulties (e.g., at least 2 years). Such difficulties are associated with some problems in functioning which are insufficiently severe to cause notable disruption in social, occupational, and interpersonal relationships and that may be limited to specific relationships or situations. Problems with emotions, cognitions, and behaviors are only expressed intermittently (e.g., during times of stress) or at low intensity. In contrast to mild personality disorder, the individual with personality difficulty only has some intermittent or low intensity personality-related problems (e.g., in circumscribed risk situations), but not to the extent that it compromises the individual’s ability to keep a job, initiate and maintain friendships, and have somewhat satisfactory intimate relationships.

This code may typically be used in cases where there is an issue with personality that must be addressed (e.g., perfectionism or anxiousness) or to recognize that a patient, who has undergone successful treatment of a PD, still has some residual features of the personality disturbance, which other health professionals should pay attention to. In contrast to a personality disorder diagnosis, personality difficulty is typically less complex and only limited to specific situations or relationships. Problems typically occur with less intensity or are only expressed intermittently, such as during times of stress and pressure.

== Prominent personality traits or patterns ==
In addition to the coding of severity, more detailed specifier codes are available. Under Prominent personality traits or patterns (6D11), the ICD-11 lists five trait domains, listed below, for specification of pathological traits within the clinical picture of a personality disorder or personality difficulty diagnosis. In addition to the trait specifiers, there is also a borderline pattern, which is similar to the specific categorical diagnosis of BPD.

Given that personality functioning might be impaired in different ways, the trait domain specifiers are available to characterize the specific pattern of traits (i.e., style) that contribute to the global personality dysfunction. These specifiers serve to describe the individual trait expressions of the personality disturbance (i.e., the flavor of the disorder). For example, it makes a substantial difference whether the impairment is related to being overly anxious and avoidant (e.g., Negative Affectivity and Detachment) or very self-centered and dominant (e.g., Dissociality). Those two different trait expressions reflect different kinds of problems and may inform different treatment approaches. The trait qualifiers are not like categories or syndromal diagnoses, but instead denote stylistic dimensions that contribute to the expression of the personality dysfunction. However, for the purpose of coding, the prominent trait qualifiers can only be indicated as present or absent even though they exist on a continuum.

It is possible to assign as many trait specifiers as necessary to describe the individual. Interpretation of different trait domain combinations tends to say more about the person than interpretations at the individual domain level. For example, two persons characterized by Negative Affectivity may evidently share certain features of this trait domain. However, the first person has a combination with Detachment (e.g., internalized anger and self-blaming), whereas the other has a combination with Dissociality (e.g., externalized anger and blaming others). Moreover, the number or complexity of trait domain specifiers often mirrors the global severity. Thus, a severe PD is likely to be associated with several trait domain specifiers, whereas a Mild PD may be associated with the presence of only one trait specifier. However, in some cases a patient may have a severe PD and manifest only one prominent trait specifier (e.g., Dissociality causing severe danger towards others).

=== Negative affectivity ===
Tendency to experience a broad range of negative emotions forms the central element of negative affectivity (6D11.0). In people with a personality disorder diagnosis, this typically means that they experience a broad range of negative emotions with a frequency and intensity that others judge as being out of proportion to the situation. Common negative emotions include anxiety, worry, sadness, fear, anger, hostility, guilt and shame. The person often experiences emotional lability with accompanying difficulties in emotional self-regulation. They are often easily distressed and it takes them longer than average for their emotions to return to their baseline levels.

As a result of intense and frequent emotions, negative thoughts and attitudes commonly occur which, in turn, further fuel strong emotional reactions. Hopeless thoughts are frequent, as well as a tendency to assume that interventions or solutions suggested by friends, family and professionals will not help their situation. Individuals often have low self-esteem and self-confidence which may result in avoiding situations or activities as they anticipate difficulty. Often, they do find situations difficult, because of their emotional sensitivity. They may become highly dependent on others for advice, reassurance, help and direction. At times, they may be envious of other’s abilities and successes, given their own challenges. In more severe cases they may experience intense feelings of worthlessness and suicidal ideation.

=== Detachment ===
Detachment (6D11.1) has both social and emotional manifestations. Social detachment in people with a personality disorder diagnosis consists of significant avoidance of social interactions and what they may consider unnecessary interpersonal contact. The person may often respond in ways that actively discourage social interaction. As a result, the person often lacks friends or even acquaintances, often avoiding intimacy of all kinds, including sexual intimacy. In the professional realm, detachment may incentivize attempting to obtain a job which does not require social interactions. Emotional detachment is evident in a reserved and aloof manner with limited emotional expression and experience, both verbally and non-verbally. In extreme cases a person may report a lack of emotional experience altogether; they may be unreactive to positive or negative events and both report and demonstrate a limited capacity for enjoyment.

=== Dissociality ===
At the centre of the dissociality (6D11.2) trait domain is disregard for the feelings and rights of others which includes self-centeredness and lack of empathy. People with this trait may demonstrate grandiosity, a sense of entitlement, and expectation of others to admire them. They may display attention-seeking behavior, endeavouring to attract the attention of others or to ensure that they are at the centre of other people’s attention. If others do not respond as they wish they may dramatically express their dissatisfaction. For example, such individuals respond with anger or denigration of others when they are not granted admiration. Dissociality may lead to a disregard of the importance of others and the person may have a relentless focus on their own needs, desires and comfort. Lack of empathy includes being deceptive, manipulative, exploiting, ruthless, mean, callous, and physically aggressive, while sometimes taking pleasure in others’ suffering.

=== Disinhibition ===
The disinhibition (6D11.3) trait domain involves impulsive action in response to immediate internal or environmental stimuli without consideration of longer-term consequences. People with this trait tend to act rashly without considering the impact of their actions on themselves or others in the longer term; this can include putting themselves or others at risk. Difficulties delaying reward or satisfaction result in strong associations with such behaviours as substance use, gambling, and unplanned sexual activity. Alongside impulsive action, appraisal of risk is impaired combined with an absence of an appropriate sense of caution resulting in, for example, reckless driving, dangerous sports, and activities without appropriate training and preparation.

People with this trait are frequently distractible, becoming easily bored or frustrated with routine, difficult or tedious tasks and may often be seen scanning the environment for more pleasurable options. People with a personality disorder with this trait often demonstrate a lack of planning preferring spontaneous over planned activities with a focus on immediate emotions and sensations with little attention to long-, and sometimes even short-, term goals. Consequently, they often fail to reach any of the goals that they set themselves.

=== Anankastia ===
Individuals high on anankastia (6D11.4) have a very clear and detailed personal sense of perfection and imperfection that extends beyond the typical standards of their community. Focusing intensely on detail, they are highly systematic and organized to the point of being rigid. They believe strongly that everyone should follow all rules exactly and meet all obligations, and they are preoccupied with social rules and obligations and what should be considered right and wrong.

To ensure that their perfectionistic standards are met, individuals with this trait strongly believe in controlling themselves and situations. Their intensity of focus on issues or orderliness, neatness and structure frequently leads to interpersonal difficulties because they expect these same high standards from everyone else, and may redo the work of others because it does not meet their perfectionistic standards.

Applying the same rules of order to their emotional and behavioural expression, such that they do not express emotions or only in a very minimal way, is common manifestation of the trait. Their extreme planfulness means that they are often incapable of spontaneity or of making changes to their schedule. They are very risk-aware and so are highly unlikely to engage in any activity that would be likely to have a negative consequence. They may also have extreme difficulty making decisions as they are not sure that they have considered every aspect of the situation.

The ICD-11 classification's inclusion of a separate domain of Anankastia stands in contrast to the Alternative DSM-5 model for personality disorders, and corresponds to Compulsivity and partially to reversed Disinhibition. Negative associations with Disinhibition (i.e., reversed Disinhibition) does not seem to account for these features, which supports WHO’s decision of including a separate domain of Anankastia. For example, narcissistic personality disorder has been found to be characterized by both Disinhibition (e.g., entitlement expressed as difficulty delaying reward and satisfaction) and Anankastia (e.g., narcissistic perfectionism, vanity, and control), which would not be possible to portray and code simultaneously on a single bipolar domain of Disinhibition (i.e., low versus high Disinhibition). This is overall consistent with empirical findings and clinical arguments supporting the utility of a separate domain of Anankastia, while recognizing that this domain is substantially but not entirely the polar opposite of Disinhibition.

=== Borderline pattern ===
In addition to the classification of PD severity and the most prominent trait domains, the ICD-11 also provides a borderline pattern specifier (6D11.5), which is very similar to the DSM-IV and DSM-5 definitions of borderline personality disorder. Thus, in contrast to the ICD-10 operationalization of Emotionally unstable personality disorder (F60.3; i.e., F60.30 impulsive subtype and F60.31 borderline subtype), the ICD-11 borderline pattern specifier is defined by the nine familiar DSM-IV/5 features, including “dissociative symptoms or psychotic-like features (e.g., brief hallucinations, paranoia in situations of high affective arousal)”. In supplement to these nine features, the user may also take three additional manifestations of the borderline pattern into consideration, which may be of help for both diagnostic pattern recognition, more fine-grained clinical description, and treatment planning: 1) a view of self as bad, inadequate, guilty, and contemptible; 2) a sense of alienation or loneliness; and 3) rejection sensitivity, problems with trust, and misinterpretation of social signals.

The validity and usefulness of inclusion of borderline pattern in the ICD-11 has been questioned and disputed, on the grounds that it may be redundant. One research paper states that: "Regression and item-level factor analyses reveal that borderline criteria do not form a separate construct and are indissociable from negative affectivity. Furthermore, borderline adds nothing to the remaining domains when it comes to predict PD severity. The borderline pattern appears as largely superfluous and even misguiding, unless their criteria are properly integrated within the structure of personality pathology." Reasons for inclusion of the borderline pattern included a longstanding coverage of BPD in clinical literature and research, and its specific association with treatment and insurance reimbursement.

== See also ==
- Dangerous and severe personality disorder – UK policy term, used from 1999 to 2013
- List of diagnostic classification and rating scales used in psychiatry
- List of ICD-9 codes 290–319: mental disorders
- Revised NEO Personality Inventory – Big Five personality trait inventory
