= Grandiosity =

Unrealistic sense of superiority and of uniqueness

In psychology, grandiosity is a sense of superiority, uniqueness, or invulnerability that is unrealistic and not based on personal capability. It may be expressed by exaggerated beliefs regarding one's abilities, the belief that few other people have anything in common with oneself, and that one can only be understood by a few, very special people. Grandiosity is a core diagnostic criterion for hypomania/mania in bipolar disorder and narcissistic personality disorder.

== Measurement ==
Few scales exist for the sole purpose of measuring grandiosity, though one recent attempt is the Narcissistic Grandiosity Scale (NGS), an adjective rating scale where one indicates the applicability of a word to oneself (e.g. superior, glorious).

Grandiosity is also measured as part of other tests, including the Specific Psychotic Experiences Questionnaire (SPEQ), Personality Inventory for DSM-5 (PID-5), Psychopathy Checklist-Revised, and diagnostic interviews for bipolar disorders and NPD. The Grandiosity section of the Diagnostic Interview for Narcissism (DIN), for instance, describes:

1. The person exaggerates talents, capacity, and achievements in an unrealistic way.
2. The person believes in their invulnerability or does not recognize their limitations.
3. The person has grandiose fantasies.
4. The person believes that they do not need other people.
5. The person overexamines and downgrades other people's projects, statements, or dreams in an unrealistic manner.
6. The person regards themself as unique or special when compared to other people.
7. The person regards themself as generally superior to other people.
8. The person behaves self-centeredly and/or self-referentially.
9. The person behaves in a boastful or pretentious way.

== Specific manifestations ==
=== In narcissism ===
Grandiose narcissism is a subtype of narcissism with grandiosity as its central feature, in addition to other agentic and antagonistic traits (e.g., dominance, attention-seeking, entitlement, manipulation). The term "narcissistic grandiosity" is sometimes used as a synonym for grandiose narcissism.

In the Alternative DSM-5 model for personality disorders (AMPD), grandiosity is one out of two pathological personality traits required for a diagnosis of narcissistic personality disorder, with the other one being attention seeking.

=== In bipolar disorder ===
Grandiosity is a core diagnostic feature of the manic and hypomanic episodes of bipolar disorder type 1 and 2, respectively. The presentation varies across disorder type, but generally manifests as extreme self-confidence associated with a bold, proactive pursuit of certain (often unrealistic) goals, including writing a book, publicity-seeking over ideas or inventions devised without appropriate knowledge, experience or expertise, or taking major risks (e.g., in business or with finances) on the assumption that one cannot fail.

In bipolar type 1, grandiosity can transition into full-blown delusions of grandeur (e.g., being a famous intellectual; having a special relationship with important world figures), often associated with other mood-congruent psychotic features.

=== In psychopathy ===
Grandiosity features in Factor 1, Facet 1 (Interpersonal) in the Hare Psychopathy Checklist-Revised (PCL-R) test. Individuals endorsing this criterion appear arrogant and boastful, and may be unrealistically optimistic about their future. The American Psychiatric Association's DSM-5 also notes that persons with antisocial personality disorder often display an inflated self-image, and can appear "excessively opinionated, self-assured, or cocky", and often hold others in contempt.

== Mechanism ==
Despite the prominence of grandiosity in the research literature, few theories or even studies of its underlying mechanisms exist. Approximately 23% of the variance in grandiosity is explained by genetics, with the majority of remaining variance attributable to non-shared environmental factors.

=== Cognitive ===
Research has consistently indicated a role of positive rumination (repetitive positive self-focused thoughts). Recently, an experimental study found that having participants engage in overly-positive rumination (i.e. think about times when they felt special, unique, important or superior) lead to increases in state grandiosity, whereas a control distraction condition conferred no such increment. Another study confirmed that positive ruminations confer grandiose self-perceptions in the moment, and found that (grandiosity-prone) patients with bipolar disorder (compared with healthy controls) exhibited heightened connectivity between brain regions associated with self-relevant information-processing during this task (medial prefrontal and anterior cingulate cortices) Further, experimental studies suggest that grandiose narcissists maintain their inflated self-esteem following criticism by recalling self-aggrandizing memories.

Correlational designs further confirm the associations of mania/hypomania and grandiose narcissism with positive self-rumination, and to specific expressions of positive rumination after success (e.g. believing that success in one domain indicates likely success in another). Grandiose fantasies, conceptually similar to positive rumination, also feature in narcissism. While grandiose narcissism has been associated with attentional and mnemonic biases to positive self-related words,

=== Other theories ===
A common characteristic of disorders and traits associated with grandiosity is heightened positive affect and potential dysregulation thereof. This is true of mania/hypomania in bipolar disorder, grandiose narcissism, and the interpersonal facet of psychopathy. Such associations partially inspired the Narcissism Spectrum Model, which posits grandiosity reflects the combination of self-preoccupation and "boldness" – exaggerated positive emotionality, self-confidence, and reward-seeking, which is ostensibly linked with neurobiological systems mediating behavioural approach motivation.

While no neuroimaging studies have specifically assessed the association between grandiosity and the reward system (or any other system), some neuroimaging studies using composite scales of grandiosity with other traits offer tentative support of these assertions, while others using the same measure suggest no association.

Contrary to frequent assertions by narcissism researchers, and despite much study of the matter, there is only weak and inconsistent evidence that grandiosity (when specifically and reliably measured) and grandiose narcissism have any association with parental overvaluation. The largest study on the matter found no association whatsoever.

== Relationship with other variables ==
Grandiosity is well documented to have associations with both positive/adaptive and negative/maladaptive outcomes, leading some researchers to question whether it is necessarily pathological.

=== Positive/adaptive ===
Grandiosity demonstrates moderate-to-strong positive correlations with self-esteem, typically becoming larger in size when controlling for confounding variables. It relates positively to self-rated superiority and is inversely associated with self-rated worthlessness. It is also associated with a host of other variables (often even when controlling for self-esteem), including positive affect, optimism, life satisfaction, behavioural activation system functioning, and all forms of emotional resilience. It also correlates positively with adaptive narcissism, namely authoritativeness, charisma, self-assurance and ambitiousness. Moreover, it exhibits negative associations with depression, anxiety, pessimism and shame. Grandiosity has a small positive relationship with intelligence and achievement.

=== Negative/maladaptive ===
Grandiosity has a well-studied association with aggression (both physical and verbal), risk-taking (e.g. financial, social, sexual) and competitiveness. It also has reliable associations with maladaptive narcissistic traits like entitlement and interpersonal exploitativeness. Even when controlling for exploitativeness, however, grandiosity still predicts unethical behaviours like lying, cheating and stealing. Grandiosity seems to be specifically related to rationalised cheating (i.e. opportunistic cheating behaviour whose context allows the behaviour to be construed as something other than cheating), but not deliberative cheating (i.e. conscious premeditation to violate rules and cheat).

== Related traits ==
Grandiosity is associated and often confused with other personality traits, including self-esteem, entitlement, and contemptuousness.

Self-esteem
While the exact difference between high self-esteem and grandiosity has yet to be fully elucidated, research suggests that, while strongly correlated, they predict different outcomes. While both predict positive outcomes like optimism, life and job satisfaction, extraversion and positive affect, grandiosity uniquely predicts entitlement, exploitativeness and aggression.

Entitlement
Entitlement is regularly confused with grandiosity even in peer-reviewed articles, but the literature nevertheless offers a clear discrimination of the two. Psychological entitlement is a sense of deservingness to positive outcomes, and can be founded on either grandiosity or feelings of deprivation. Like self-esteem, grandiosity and entitlement are well documented to predict different outcomes. Entitlement appears to be associated with more maladaptive outcomes, including low empathy, antisocial behaviour, and poor mental health, whereas grandiosity predicts better mental health.

Devaluation/contempt
Grandiosity is only weakly related to regarding others as worthless (devaluation or contemptuousness).

== Other aspects ==
=== Reality testing ===
A distinction is made between individuals exhibiting grandiosity which includes a degree of insight into their unrealistic thoughts (they are aware that their behavior is considered unusual), and those experiencing grandiose delusions who lack this capability for reality-testing. Some individuals may transition between these two states, with grandiose ideas initially developing as "daydreams" that the patient recognises as untrue, but which can subsequently turn into full delusions that the patient becomes convinced reflect reality.

=== Psychoanalytic theories of grandiosity ===
Otto Kernberg saw the unhealthily grandiose self as merging childhood feelings of specialness, personal ideals, and fantasies of an ideal parent.

Heinz Kohut saw the grandiose self as a normal part of the developmental process, only pathological when the grand and humble parts of the self became decisively divided. Kohut's recommendations for dealing with the patient with a disordered grandiose self were to tolerate and so re-integrate the grandiosity with the realistic self.

== See also ==
- God complex
- Egotism
- Omnipotence
- Supremacism
