= Alternative DSM-5 model for personality disorders =

Dimensional–categorical hybrid model of personality disorders

The cover of the DSM-5, in which the Alternative DSM-5 Model for Personality Disorders was introduced

The Alternative DSM-5 Model for Personality Disorders (AMPD), introduced in Section III of the Diagnostic and Statistical Manual of Mental Disorders, Fifth Edition (DSM-5), is a dimensional–categorical hybrid model of personality disorders, meaning that it integrates a dimensional model of personality disorders with a categorical one. This is achieved through mapping of individual, categorical personality disorders to specific combinations of impairment in personality functioning and pathological personality traits.

The alternative model features the following specific personality disorders: antisocial, avoidant, borderline, narcissistic, obsessive–compulsive, and schizotypal, constituting a reduction of entities, as the standard model contains the diagnoses of dependent, histrionic, paranoid, and schizoid personality disorders in addition to those in the AMPD. It also contains a trait specified diagnosis for manifestations of personality disorder not covered by the specific diagnoses, such as the four omitted categories.

Designed to address limitations of the categorical classification of personality disorders – such as heterogeneous PD categories, excessive comorbidity, arbitrary thresholds and insufficient diagnostic precision – the AMPD has generally been found to hold validity; however, it remains subject to ongoing debate and research in regards to aspects such as the relationship between traits and functioning level.

== Background ==
The categorical model of personality disorders in the DSM was originally introduced in the DSM-III, released in 1980, replacing the previously used narrative-based diagnoses with diagnoses based on clearly defined criteria. This categorical model persisted in subsequent editions – such as the DSM-III-R and DSM-IV – of the DSM. In the 2000s, when the upcoming DSM-5 was being planned and developed, there was a consensus that the categorical model was insufficient due to personality disorders being better understood as dimensional, while the categorical approach was understood to have had a negative impact on the development of conceptual and clinical aspects of personality disorders. Shifting the paradigm in psychiatric diagnosis in the direction of a dimensional approach was a significant intention behind the proposal to create a new DSM edition.

=== Early undertakings ===
The Personality and Personality Disorders Work Group (PPDWG) was responsible for the development of the chapter on PDs for the DSM-5. Originally named the Personality Disorders Work Group (PDWG), it was headed by chair Andrew E. Skodol beginning in 2007; the renaming occurred due to the understanding that the group was to shift to a dimensional approach. The paradigm shift had come to be manifested in the exclusion of the majority of individuals who worked on the DSM-IV from the early stages of development of the DSM-5, including from the work groups, with Larry Siever being the only one of the eleven members of the PPDWG who had been part of the DSM-IV PDWG.

During their initial work, there was disagreement among the members of the PPDWG in regards to several aspects of the establishment of a new system for PDs for the upcoming DSM. While initially opting for a broad approach towards the selection of a conceptual model for PDs, agreement in favor of a dimensional approach emerged; however, disagreements continued regarding which specific model should be used. For example, there was tension between the use of one of several established models and the creation of a new one with lesser basis in research. Another matter of debate was whether all, or merely some, of the categorical PD diagnoses should remain, with consideration given to their validity and utility – as well as to these in relation to their entrenchment in practice and to the thus possible benefits of retention of continuity with the extant categorical model.

=== Emergence and rejection ===
The PPDWG iteratively developed what became a dimensional–categorical hybrid model of personality disorders which was to replace the previously used categorical model. In 2009, Skodol made the first proposal of a model, consisting of ratings of impairment in functioning, as well as of six trait domains consisting of specific traits – with both impairment and traits rated numerically. The five herein included personality disorders – namely: antisocial, avoidant, borderline, obsessive–compulsive, and schizotypal – were described through narratives, the correspondence of a subject with which was to be rated along with a rating of the elevation of the traits associated with the PD.

During the evolution of the model, it was redesigned as a hybrid model anchored in impairment in areas of personality functioning and dimensional traits. Initially absent, narcissistic personality disorder was brought into the model following feedback from clinicians and researchers. The model also faced scrutiny against strict standards for evidence and utility. The Work Group and the DSM-5 Task Force recommended the transition to the model in its final form; however, in 2012, the American Psychiatric Association (APA) Board of Trustees voted against it, resulting in the new model being included in section III of the DSM-5 as the Alternative DSM-5 Model for Personality Disorders, with the DSM-IV categorical model being retained as the standard model in section II.

== Core features ==
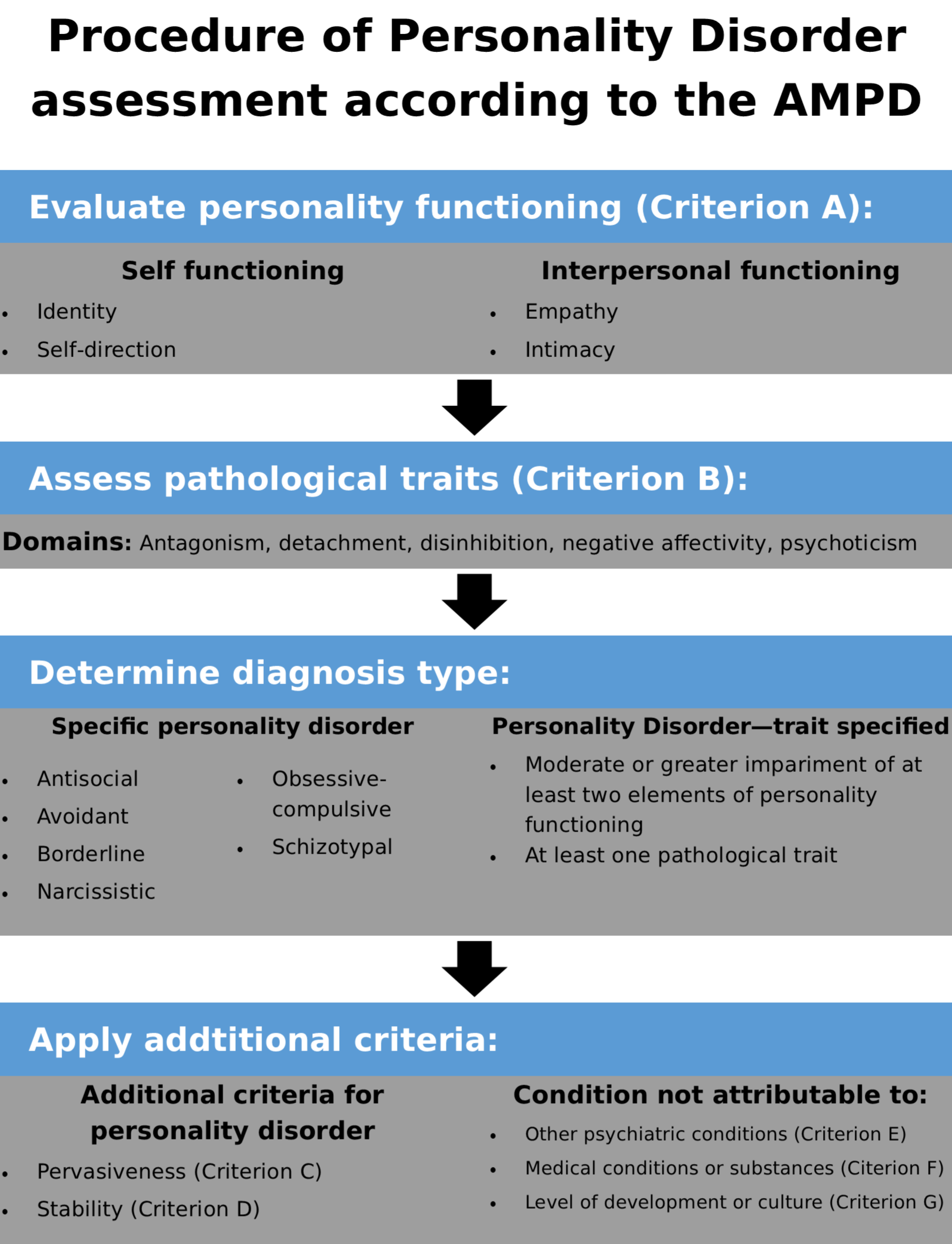
Flowchart showing an overview of the AMPD's PD assessment procedure.

The alternative model contains seven general criteria for what constitutes a personality disorder (PD), as well as criteria for specific and trait specified personality disorders. Of the general criteria, criterion A, i.e., an assessment of personality functioning level; and criterion B, i.e., an assessment of pathological personality traits; are the most prominent, both in clinical practice and as subjects of research.

Further requirements are embodied in the additional general criteria, necessitating that a subject's manifestation of criteria A and B impacts them broadly (criterion C), having remained temporally stable since youth (criterion D); while criteria E and F account for differential diagnosis in regards to other mental disorders and effects of medical conditions or substances; and criterion G excludes what is normal for the individual's social environment or developmental stage. These additional criteria align with traditional PD requirements.

The general criteria apply to any diagnosis of a PD, and as such, to any specified personality disorder, as well as to Personality Disorder - Trait Specified.

=== Criterion A: Level of personality functioning ===
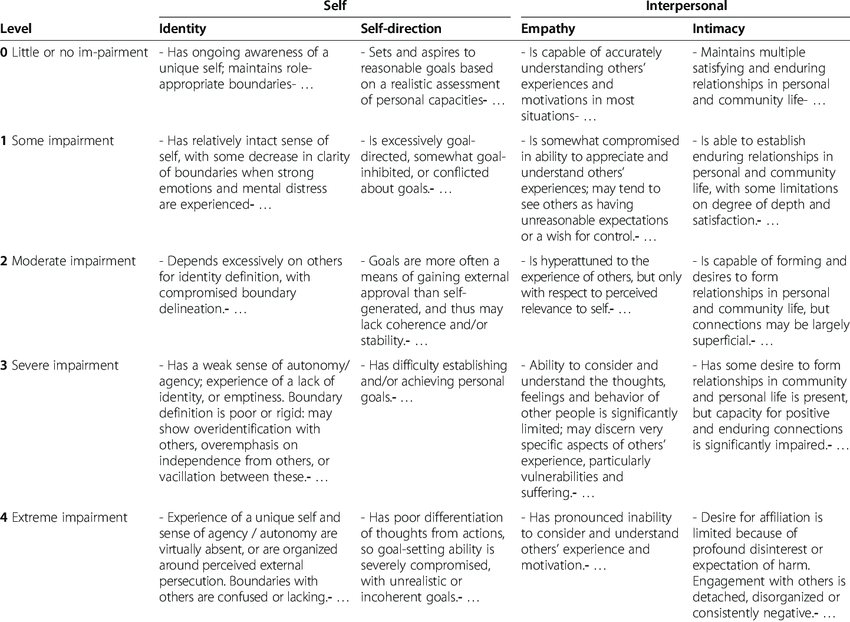
Table showing a prototypical description of one subdomain of each LPFS element at every level of impairment

Supposed to capture fundamental problems specific and common to personality disorders, the level of personalty functioning is assessed in accordance with a scale provided with the AMPD called the Level of Personality Functioning Scale (LPFS). It ranges from 0 ("Little or no impairment") to 4 ("Extreme impairment"), thus making the model truly dimensional and inclusive of the entire spectrum of personality functioning.

In the LPFS, personality functioning is conceptualized as consisting of self functioning, comprising identity and self-direction; and interpersonal functioning, comprising empathy and intimacy. Each element consists of three subdomains, such as "comprehension and appreciation of others’ experiences, tolerance of differing perspectives, and understanding the effects of one’s own behavior on others" for the empathy element. However, the severity is conceptualized as being unidimensional.

A diagnosis of a personality disorder requires that the overall impairment is moderate or greater (impairment ≥ 2), stemming from this having been found to be the best threshold value for alignment with the population receiving DSM-IV PD diagnoses. The manner in which the overall level of functioning is determined is not universally defined; instruments of measure vary from reliance on clinical judgement to the average impairment across the twelve subdomains.

=== Criterion B: Pathological personality traits ===
The pathological traits of criterion B serve to describe the characteristics of any personality disorder, with identification of traits providing an explanation to specific reasons for impairment in personality functioning. Twenty-five pathological personality traits, known as trait facets, are grouped into the following domains: negative affectivity, detachment, antagonism, disinhibition, and psychoticism. Each domain is indexed by three specific facets; the other ten facets can be used for further characterization of individuals’ personality traits. For example, the core facets of Antagonism are Manipulativeness, Deceitfulness, and Grandiosity, whereas Attention Seeking, Callousness, and Hostility may additionally characterize some individuals who manifest pathological-range Antagonism.

Predominantly, these traits are assessed using the Personality Inventory for DSM-5 (PID-5). There is also the Structured Clinical Interview for Personality Traits, which is Module II of the SCID-5-AMPD.

The trait domains in the AMPD align with the more broadly used Five Factor Model of personality, but with focus on the mal-adaptive ends of each of these personality factor spectra. The relationship between the Five Factor Model's openness and the AMPD's psychoticism has been subject to dispute. Studies on the topic have utilized different measures and definitions of the two concepts and have given mixed results, with some studies showing little to no connection while other studies report a weak correlation. Conceptualizations of openness differ from each other, with some focusing on traits such as self-actualization and open-mindedness, whereas others align more closely with schizotypal tendencies, the latter resulting in higher correlations with psychoticism.

Trait domains and facets in the AMPD
Trait domain	Description	Facet	Further information
Negative affectivity	A disposition toward frequent and intense negative emotions	**Anxiousness**	Anxiety
Negative affectivity	A disposition toward frequent and intense negative emotions	**Emotional lability**	Emotional lability
Negative affectivity	A disposition toward frequent and intense negative emotions	**Separation insecurity**	Separation insecurity
Negative affectivity	A disposition toward frequent and intense negative emotions	Hostility (also under Antagonism)	Hostility
Negative affectivity	A disposition toward frequent and intense negative emotions	Perseveration	Perseveration
Negative affectivity	A disposition toward frequent and intense negative emotions	Submissiveness	Deference § Psychology
Detachment	A pattern of withdrawing from social interactions and emotional expression, with pleasurable experiences restricted	**Anhedonia**	Anhedonia
Detachment	A pattern of withdrawing from social interactions and emotional expression, with pleasurable experiences restricted	**Intimacy avoidance**	Fear of intimacy
Detachment	A pattern of withdrawing from social interactions and emotional expression, with pleasurable experiences restricted	**Withdrawal**	Social withdrawal
Detachment	A pattern of withdrawing from social interactions and emotional expression, with pleasurable experiences restricted	Depressivity	Depression (mood)
Detachment	A pattern of withdrawing from social interactions and emotional expression, with pleasurable experiences restricted	Restricted affectivity (lack thereof under Negative affectivity)	Emotional detachment
Detachment	A pattern of withdrawing from social interactions and emotional expression, with pleasurable experiences restricted	Suspiciousness (also under Negative affectivity)	Suspicion (emotion)
Antagonism	Behaviors marked by disregard for others and which are conducive to disharmony	**Deceitfulness**	Deceitfulness (redirect to Wiktionary)
Antagonism	Behaviors marked by disregard for others and which are conducive to disharmony	**Grandiosity**	Grandiosity
Antagonism	Behaviors marked by disregard for others and which are conducive to disharmony	**Manipulativeness**	Manipulation (psychology)
Antagonism	Behaviors marked by disregard for others and which are conducive to disharmony	Attention seeking	Attention seeking
Antagonism	Behaviors marked by disregard for others and which are conducive to disharmony	Callousness	Callous and unemotional traits
Disinhibition	Inclination towards immediate rewards being given priority over long-term planning	**Distractability**	Distraction
Disinhibition	Inclination towards immediate rewards being given priority over long-term planning	**Impulsivity**	Impulsivity
Disinhibition	Inclination towards immediate rewards being given priority over long-term planning	**Irresponsibility**	Responsibility (disambiguation)
Disinhibition	Inclination towards immediate rewards being given priority over long-term planning	Rigid perfectionism (lack of)	Perfectionism (psychology)
Disinhibition	Inclination towards immediate rewards being given priority over long-term planning	Risk taking	Risk-taking
Psychoticism	A pattern of unusual perceptions, thoughts, and behaviors that may seem eccentric or disconnected from shared social and cultural expectations	**Cognitive and preceptual dysregulation**	Dissociation (psychology)
Psychoticism	A pattern of unusual perceptions, thoughts, and behaviors that may seem eccentric or disconnected from shared social and cultural expectations	**Eccentricity**	Eccentricity (behavior)
Psychoticism	A pattern of unusual perceptions, thoughts, and behaviors that may seem eccentric or disconnected from shared social and cultural expectations	**Unusual beliefs and experiences**	Thought disorder
The three main facets for each domain are formatted in **bold** font. Other facets are in the regular format. The target articles of wikilinks under "Further information" are intended to provide context and do not necessarily reflect the definitions of the corresponding trait facets.

== Diagnoses ==
For the purpose of establishing a diagnosis, criteria A and B are applied together. An assessment of correspondence with the specific personality disorders is conducted; if the presentation does not match one of these, a personality disorder–trait specified (PD-TS) diagnosis is given, subject to the requirements of the general criteria. For both specific PDs and PD-TS, the criterion A requirement is impairment in any two out of the four elements of criterion A – in contrast to requiring any one, or at least one for self and one for interpersonal functioning; this stems from this having been found to yield the most optimal correspondence with DSM-IV personality disorders.

=== Specific personality disorders ===
The six specific personality disorders included in the AMPD are based on PDs as described in the DSM-IV, though conceptualized through functioning level and pathological traits. For the two main criteria of these PDs, a particular constellation of personality impairments and maladaptive traits that indicate that specific PD are described. More specifically, at least moderate impairment in at least two elements of personality functioning, as well as at least a certain number of pathological personality traits characteristic of the specific PD, must be present in order for the criteria to be met.

Short AMPD description of avoidant personality disorder

Typical features of avoidant personality disorder are avoidance of social situations and inhibition in interpersonal relationships related to feelings of ineptitude and inadequacy, anxious preoccupation with negative evaluation and rejection, and fears of ridicule or embarrassment.

For every specific personality disorder, there is a description of the characteristic manner in which the elements of personality functioning are impacted. For example, the identity element in criterion A for antisocial PD is “[e]gocentrism; self-esteem derived from personal gain, power, or pleasure”, whereas for avoidant PD it is “[l]ow self-esteem associated with self-appraisal as socially inept, personally unappealing, or inferior; excessive feelings of shame”. Level of personality functioning may optionally be recorded for any of the disorders.

There are also descriptions of how mal-adaptive traits characteristic of the disorder commonly manifest themselves as part thereof, such as obsessive–compulsive PD’s Criterion B requiring a pathological level of three of the following four trait facets: Rigid perfectionism, Perseveration Intimacy Avoidance, and Restricted Affectivity, whereas that for Schizotypal PD requires four or more of six trait facets: Cognitive and Perceptual Dysregulation, Unusual beliefs and Experiences, Eccentric Perceptions (all three of which are facets of the Psychoticism domain), Restricted Affectivity, Withdrawal, and Suspiciousness. Moreover, some facets are modified to reflect a specific PD more precisely. For example, the description of trait facet Withdrawal for Avoidant PD, omits the phrase “preference for being alone to being with others,” while retaining the other descriptors: “reticence in social situations; avoidance of social contacts and activity; [and] lack of initiation of social contact”.

Lastly, it is stated in the AMPD that if an individual has “one or even several prominent traits that may have clinical relevance in addition to those required for a specific PD, the option exists for these to be noted as specifiers”. One example of this is narcissistic personality disorder (NPD) having suggested specifiers of additional antagonistic traits as well as traits of negative affectivity for malignant and vulnerable manifestations of NPD, respectively.

=== Personality Disorder–Trait Specified ===
The AMPD also contains a diagnostic category called Personality Disorder–Trait Specified (PD-TS), which is applicable to subjects meeting the general criteria of the AMPD in cases where the clinical presentation is a mixture of, or atypical for, those of the specific personality disorders, including clinical presentations that would be diagnosed with Section II paranoid, schizoid, histrionic, or dependent PD, or those of previous DSMs (e.g., passive–aggressive personality disorder).

A diagnosis of PD-TS consists of pathology within at least two elements of personality functioning, as well as of at least one pathological trait. These being specified makes PD-TS more useful for description and informing treatment than its counterpart in the DSM-IV system, personality disorder not otherwise specified (PD-NOS).

== Reception and validity ==
Since its publication in the DSM-5, the AMPD has given rise to and been subject to a multitude of research aimed at proving or disproving its validity and usefulness in clinical settings, as well as comparing it to other models, such as the standard model in the DSM-5. The results of the research have largely supported the model's overall validity.

=== Complexity ===
Although the AMPD has been criticized for possibly complicating communication and classification of personality disorders, due to its dimensional nature comprising a multitude of factors, a diagnosis based in a dimensional model may prove more useful because it provides a descriptive rather than purely categorical diagnosis. As such, an AMPD diagnosis has advantages such as giving a more in-depth description of the nature of an individual's mental impairment and suffering, in addition to documenting both the presence of a personality disorder and the specific ways in which it manifests, with the specified PD categories found in the AMPD maintaining a degree of compatibility with the standard model. This compatibility has been demonstrated through correlations between personality disorders in the AMPD and their standard model counterparts being strong for all AMPD PDs except obsessive–compulsive and schizotypal PDs, which had moderate correlations of 0.57 and 0.63, respectively; this was suggested to "likely to be as high as [the agreement] between two diagnosticians on DSM-IV (and now DSM-5 Section II) diagnoses".

Contrary to the aforementioned concern regarding possible complexities introduced by the AMPD, ease of use has also been described as being an advantage pertaining to the alternative model. In addition to this, although the standard model – in this case the one in the DSM-IV-TR, which is the same as the standard model in section II of the DSM-5 – has been described as useful and easy to use by professionals, a study has shown that in the majority of domains measured, professionals rated the AMPD to be at least equal to or even superior to the standard model. The standard model was not evidently perceived as being superior to the AMPD, whereas there is significant evidence for the alternative model being perceived by professionals as having multiple advantages compared to the standard model.

=== Criteria A and B ===
A significant theoretic-empirical question that remains undecided is the degree of overlap that “should” exist both among and between measures of Criterion A and B. That is, given that maladaptive traits are the overt expressions of personality dysfunction, some degree of overlap (i.e., cross-correlation) is expected, but a high degree of overlap would indicate redundancy and poor discriminant validity. However, there is no consensus yet on the “theoretically ideal” degree of overlap. Research has found a strong correlation between results from assessment regarding level of personality functioning and maladaptive personality traits, respectively, which makes it difficult to separate which way each of these influences the personality disorder. Interpretations of this are a significant subject of the literature on the alternative model.

Criterion A, specifically, has been criticized for being inadequate at capturing the core essence of personality disorders and differentiating them from other types of mental disorders. It has been suggested that criterion A should be removed from the AMPD in favor of measuring the impacts of criterion B traits. Assessment of the level of personality functioning as a core element in the diagnosis of personality disorder has been argued to have the benefit of clearly defining how severe the impairment must be and how it manifests in general functioning, rather than diagnosis relying merely on traits, which may not necessarily cause impairment significant enough to warrant a diagnosis. In addition, the LPFS captures a clearly defined core of what personality functioning is and how impairment generally manifests, regardless of specified pathological traits.

A point of criticism leveled against criterion B is that the model does not define the amplitude of a trait required for its inclusion in the basis for a diagnosis.

=== Inclusion of specific personality disorders ===
The AMPD has received criticism for not including four of the distinct diagnostic categories found in the standard model, which lacked broad professional consensus when the AMPD was created. Thus, an online survey was conducted among members of the Association for Research on Personality Disorders and the International Society for the Study of Personality Disorders to assess perceptions of the utility and validity of the DSM-IV-TR personality disorder categories, which are the same as the categories found in the DSM-5 standard model. The results indicated that most respondents regarded all personality disorders, particularly antisocial and borderline personality disorders, as valid. The only diagnosis regarding the inclusion of which the majority of respondents were not clearly supportive was histrionic personality disorder. Likewise, most participants opposed the removal of any personality disorder from the classification system, with no disorder receiving majority support for deletion.

A study conducted among a sample of outpatients as well as non-patients deemed high-risk showed that slightly more than a fifth of people who met criterion A for personality disorder fit a specific personality disorder well, meaning that a great majority of people who are eligible for a diagnosis of personality disorder have a clinical picture better captured by PD-TS, unless diagnosed with several specific personality disorders and/or specifiers to those disorders, in case the criteria for at least one specific PD are met.

Both the categorical standard model and, to a lesser extent, the specific PD diagnoses in the AMPD share the weakness of being polythetic in nature; a diagnostic category may require only a subset of the total amount of criteria to be fulfilled in order for a diagnosis to be made. For example, the standard model requires that five out of nine criteria be met for a borderline personality disorder diagnosis, which means that two individuals diagnosed with it could exhibit substantially different symptom profiles, with only one overlapping criterion and 256 possible combinations of criteria met. The aforementioned problem is ameliorated by the introduction of the PD-TS diagnosis, which is specific with regard to the traits present in a subject.

Lee Anna Clark and colleagues have presented “strong evidence that the AMPD yields the same overall prevalence of PD as the current model and, further, identifies largely the same overall population. It also … provides more complete, individualized characterizations of persons with PD”. In a review article, she argues that these findings provide compelling arguments for simplifying the AMPD by eliminating the specific PDs.

== Clinical utility ==
An example of the AMPD being useful in practice is its use to assess one patient by several different treatment providers at different points in time. In this case, changes in the level of personality functioning, assessed in accordance with the LPFS, have and can be noted for inclusion in the basis for treatment. Research suggests that clinicians tend to provide consistent assessments of both personality functioning and mal-adaptive traits. While the level of personality functioning may vary across time, subject to treatment, research supports that mal-adaptive traits tend to be more consistent. While the benefit has not been as clear in the case of criterion A, clinicians have noted several benefits to the AMPD's criterion B, such as its ability to capture an individual's personal set of trait pathology, which is useful both for communication with the patient and for documenting an individual's clinical picture more comprehensively.

Although there is limited research and scientific knowledge regarding the relationship between AMPD criterion B pathological traits and treatment decision-making as well as the results thereof, there is some evidence indicating that negative affectivity, by virtue of being related to neuroticism, could predict SSRI-type antidepressants having an ameliorating effect. The AMPD has additionally undergone a trial in clinical settings as part of a psychological assessment conducted on patients before they undergo bariatric surgery, which has shown the AMPD's assessment of mal-adaptive personality traits to hold significance in the pre-surgery psychological assessment. There is empirical support for Five Factor Model traits – to which AMPD criterion B traits are related – being useful when deciding on treatment approaches.

== See also ==
- Global Assessment of Functioning – Scale to rate how well one is meeting various problems in living
- List of diagnostic classification and rating scales used in psychiatry
- Revised NEO Personality Inventory – Big Five personality trait inventory
- Structured Clinical Interview for DSM – Psychiatric diagnostic interview protocol
