= Dimensional models of personality disorders =

Psychological model

Dimensional models of personality disorders (also known as the dimensional approach to personality disorders, dimensional classification, and dimensional assessments) conceptualize personality disorders as quantitatively—not qualitatively—distinct from normal personality, viewing disorders as extreme positions on continuous trait dimensions shared by the general population. They consist of extreme, maladaptive levels of certain personality characteristics – commonly described as facets within broader personality factors or traits. This is contrasted with the categorical approach, such as the standard model of classification in the DSM-5.

Within the context of personality psychology, a "dimension" refers to a continuum on which an individual can have various levels of a characteristic, in contrast to the dichotomous categorical approach in which an individual does or does not possess a characteristic. In regards to personality disorders, this means that they are classified according to which characteristics are expressed at which levels. This stands in contrast to the traditional categorical models of classification, which are based on the boolean presence or absence of symptoms and do not take into account levels of expression of a characteristic or the presence of any underlying dimension.

The way in which these diagnostic dimensions should be constructed has been under debate, particularly in the run up to the publication of the DSM-5. A number of dimensional models have been produced, differing in the way in which they are constructed and the way in which they are intended to be interpreted. There are four broad types of dimensional representation, although others also exist:

1. Dimensional representation of the original DSM categories of personality disorders;
2. Dimensional representation based on identification of latent traits with the DSM disorders;
3. Dimensional representation based on the traits from normal personality research;
4. Representation based on integration of dimensional modals, e.g. by using network analysis.

The dimensional approach is included in Section III ("Emerging Measures and Models") of the fifth edition of the Diagnostic and Statistical Manual of Mental Disorders (DSM-5), where it is titled Alternative DSM-5 Model for Personality Disorders. The decision to retain the old DSM-IV categorical model of personality disorders in DSM-5 was controversial, and efforts continue to persuade the American Psychiatric Association to replace it with the dimensional model in DSM 5.1.

== Usage ==
Dimensional models are intended to reflect what constitutes personality disorder symptomology according to a spectrum, rather than in a dichotomous way. As a result of this they have been used in three key ways; firstly to try to generate more accurate clinical diagnoses, secondly to develop more effective treatments and thirdly to determine the underlying etiology of disorders.

=== Clinical diagnosis ===
The "checklist" of symptoms that is currently used is often criticized for a lack of empirical support and its inability to recognize personality-related issues that do not fit within the current personality disorder constructs or DSM criteria. It has also been criticized for leading to diagnoses that are not stable over time, have poor cross-rater agreement and high comorbidity suggesting that they do not reflect distinct disorders. In contrast the dimensional approach has been shown to predict and reflect current diagnostic criteria, but also add to them. It has been argued to be especially useful in explaining comorbidity which is often high for patients diagnosed with a personality disorder. Following from these claims, the fifth edition of the Diagnostic and Statistical Manual of Mental Disorders (DSM-5) incorporates a combined categorical-dimensional approach to diagnosing personality disorders based on the degree to which a person shows elevated levels of particular personality characteristics. However, one of the issues in using a dimensional approach to diagnosis has been determining appropriate cut off points so as to know who belongs to the category of people requiring treatment; this is partly why both categorical and dimensional diagnoses are included.

Since the categorical model is widely used in clinical practice and has a significant body of research supporting it, its common usage is compelling to laypeople when they are judging the credibility of professional opinion. Therefore, the dimensional approach is often further criticized for being difficult to interpret and less accessible. It is however widely used in some professional settings as the established approach, for example by forensic psychologists.

=== Treatment effectiveness ===
Another suggested usage of the dimensional approach is that it can aid clinicians in developing treatment plans and assessing other mechanisms contributing to patient's difficulty in functioning within the social, personal, or occupational domains. The approach can improve treatment in two ways. Firstly it can enable development of more personalized care plans for individuals based on their adaptive and maladaptive characteristics. Secondly, it means that relevant symptomology which is not considered maladaptive can be considered when developing and evaluating general therapeutic and medical treatment.

=== Determining cause ===
Attempts at presenting an etiological description of personality disorders have been avoided due to the influence of the DSM and its principles in psychiatric research (See history section). However some techniques are looking at potential interrelated causalities between symptoms of personality disorders and broader influences including aspects of normal personality (See integrated approaches section).

== History ==
=== Initial development of a categorical model ===
The adoption of a categorical approach to personality disorders can be understood in part due to ethical principles within psychiatry. The 'do no harm principle' led to Kraepelinian assumptions about mental illness and an emphasis on empirically grounded taxonomic systems that were not biased by unsubstantiated theories about etiology. A taxonomic checklist based on empirical observations rather than bias prone theoretical assumptions developed. It was both categorical and hierarchical, with the diagnosis of a disorder being dependent on the presence of a threshold number categories (usually five) out of a total number (seven to nine) Disorders were organized into three clusters, existing purely to make the disorders easier to remember by associating them with others that have similar symptoms, not based on any theory about their relatedness.

=== Emerging problems with the categorical model ===
The dimensional model was developed in response to the limitations of this standard categorical model. The expectations from a Kraepelinian approach were that as systematic research into psychiatric health increased; diagnostic categories would be refined and targeted reliable treatments would be developed. However this reductionist approach to diagnostic categorization has led to disorders with high comorbidity, life course instability, poor treatment effectiveness and poor diagnostic agreement. In addition the findings from psychopathological research have led to an increasing body of evidence suggesting overlaps between normal and maladaptive personality and interrelatedness across disorders. These findings have been further supported by genetic and developmental studies which have constantly pointed towards greater interrelatedness then the diagnostic categories can offer. These consistently disconformity findings, alongside the successful shift to a continuous rather than categorical approach in other areas of research, such as regarding ASD, led to consideration of alternative approaches.

=== Development of methodological techniques ===
==== Factor analysis ====
The development of factor analysis as a popular statistical technique in differential psychology has led to an increase in attempts at finding underlying traits. More recently this has been used in the context of personality disorders both as a means of looking at which personality traits current categorical diagnoses are related to and also as a method of looking for new psychopathological latent variables. Factor analysis has helped illustrate that the full range of relevant personality pathology is not included in the DSM psychiatry nosology. However the technique does not show information about a continuum from normal to clinically relevant personality.

==== Dimensional analysis ====
Dimensional classification techniques show individual multidimensional profiles and therefore they can show information about a personality continuum (from normal to atypical), one such technique is Hybrid modeling. Cut off points can be introduced into these modals to show where a diagnosis may lie. However the number of different rating scales that need to be looked at and the lack of interdisciplinary research between statisticians and psychologists has meant that attempts at finding a 'worldwide' criteria for dimensional diagnosis using this method has been of limited success.

==== Comparative analysis ====
Analyses have been conducted to test the relative fit of categorical and dimensional modals to evaluate whether single diagnostic categories are suited to either status. These types of analysis can include a range of data, including endophenotypes or other genetic or biological markers which increases their utility. Multivariate genetic analysis helps establish how well the current phenotypically developed structure of personality disorder diagnosis fits with the genetic structure underlying personality disorders. Results from these types of analysis support dimensional over categorical approaches.

==== Network analysis ====
Network Analysis has been used as a means of integrating information about personality with personality disorders and as well as information about other genetic, biological and environmental influences into a single system and looking at interrelated causalities between them (See integrated modals).

== Model development ==
=== Adapted categorical models ===
There are different ways to 'dimensionalize' categorical personality disorders; these can be summarised into two categories.

1. The first involves quantifying DSM-5 pathology. This can be done either based on the degree to which symptoms are present or on how close to a prototypic presentation a patient's presentation may be. The prototype approach includes features not present in the DSM.
2. The second approach involves identification of DSM disorder traits by means of factor analysis to show underlying dimensions of the personality disorder criteria, this method may also include relevant psychopathology.

=== Normal personality models ===
==== Five-factor model ====
The Five-Factor model of personality, which is the most dominant dimensional model, has been used to conceptualize personality disorders and has received various empirical support. Under this approach, extreme levels of the basic personality traits identified by the FFM are what contributes to the maladaptive nature of personality disorders. Over 50 published studies supporting this model have been identified, providing much empirical support for this approach. Most of these studies examine the relationship between scores on separate measures of Big Five trait and personality disorder symptoms.

The Five-Factor model was first extended to personality disorders in the early 1990s, when it was established that a satisfactory profile of each personality disorder in the DSM-III-R could be created through various levels of Big Five traits. Thomas Widiger and his colleagues have demonstrated that many of the central elements of personality disorders can be explained in terms of Big Five traits – for example, borderline personality disorder is characterized by high levels of hostility, trait anxiety and depression, and vulnerability, all of which are facets of neuroticism. This approach also helps to differentiate characteristics of disorders that overlap under the current categorical model, such as avoidant and schizoid personality disorders. The Five-Factor-based approach explains much of that overlap as well as the ways in which they are different. For example, both are characterized primarily by maladaptive excessive introversion, but avoidant personality disorder also includes high levels of facets of neuroticism (such as self-consciousness, anxiety, and vulnerability), while schizotypal personality disorder includes the addition of low assertiveness. The Five-Factor approach also resolves previous anomalies in factor analyses of personality disorders, which makes it a more explanatory model than the current categorical approach, which only includes three factors (odd-eccentric, dramatic-emotional, and anxious-fearful).

DSM-IV-TR Personality disorders from the perspective of the five-factor model of general personality functioning (including previous DSM revisions)

Neuroticism (vs. emotional stability)
Factors	PPD	SzPD	StPD	ASPD	BPD	HPD	NPD	AvPD	DPD	OCPD	PAPD	DpPD	SDPD	SaPD
Anxiousness (vs. unconcerned)	—N/a	—N/a	High	Low	High	—N/a	—N/a	High	High	High	—N/a	—N/a	—N/a	—N/a
Angry hostility (vs. dispassionate)	High	—N/a	—N/a	High	High	—N/a	High	—N/a	—N/a	—N/a	High	—N/a	—N/a	—N/a
Depressiveness (vs. optimistic)	—N/a	—N/a	—N/a	—N/a	High	—N/a	—N/a	—N/a	—N/a	—N/a	—N/a	High	—N/a	—N/a
Self-consciousness (vs. shameless)	—N/a	—N/a	High	Low	—N/a	Low	Low	High	High	—N/a	—N/a	High	—N/a	—N/a
Impulsivity (vs. restrained)	—N/a	—N/a	—N/a	High	High	High	—N/a	Low	—N/a	Low	—N/a	—N/a	—N/a	—N/a
Vulnerability (vs. fearless)	—N/a	—N/a	—N/a	Low	High	—N/a	—N/a	High	High	—N/a	—N/a	—N/a	—N/a	—N/a

Extraversion (vs. introversion)
Factors	PPD	SzPD	StPD	ASPD	BPD	HPD	NPD	AvPD	DPD	OCPD	PAPD	DpPD	SDPD	SaPD
Warmth (vs. coldness)	Low	Low	Low	—N/a	—N/a	—N/a	Low	—N/a	High	—N/a	Low	Low	—N/a	High
Gregariousness (vs. withdrawal)	Low	Low	Low	—N/a	—N/a	High	—N/a	Low	—N/a	—N/a	—N/a	Low	—N/a	High
Assertiveness (vs. submissiveness)	—N/a	—N/a	—N/a	High	—N/a	—N/a	High	Low	Low	—N/a	Low	—N/a	—N/a	—N/a
Activity (vs. passivity)	—N/a	Low	—N/a	High	—N/a	High	—N/a	—N/a	—N/a	—N/a	Low	—N/a	High	—N/a
Excitement seeking (vs. lifeless)	—N/a	Low	—N/a	High	—N/a	High	High	Low	—N/a	Low	—N/a	Low	—N/a	High
Positive emotionality (vs. anhedonia)	—N/a	Low	Low	—N/a	—N/a	High	—N/a	Low	—N/a	—N/a	—N/a	—N/a	—N/a	High

Open-mindedness (vs. closed-minded)
Factors	PPD	SzPD	StPD	ASPD	BPD	HPD	NPD	AvPD	DPD	OCPD	PAPD	DpPD	SDPD	SaPD
Fantasy (vs. concrete)	—N/a	—N/a	High	—N/a	—N/a	High	—N/a	—N/a	—N/a	—N/a	—N/a	—N/a	Low	High
Aesthetics (vs. disinterest)	—N/a	—N/a	—N/a	—N/a	—N/a	—N/a	—N/a	—N/a	—N/a	—N/a	—N/a	—N/a	—N/a	—N/a
Feelings (vs. alexithymia)	—N/a	Low	—N/a	—N/a	High	High	Low	—N/a	—N/a	Low	—N/a	—N/a	—N/a	High
Actions (vs. predictable)	Low	Low	—N/a	High	High	High	High	Low	—N/a	Low	Low	—N/a	Low	—N/a
Ideas (vs. closed-minded)	Low	—N/a	High	—N/a	—N/a	—N/a	—N/a	—N/a	—N/a	Low	Low	Low	Low	—N/a
Values (vs. dogmatic)	Low	High	—N/a	—N/a	—N/a	—N/a	—N/a	—N/a	—N/a	Low	—N/a	—N/a	High	—N/a

Agreeableness (vs. antagonism)
Factors	PPD	SzPD	StPD	ASPD	BPD	HPD	NPD	AvPD	DPD	OCPD	PAPD	DpPD	SDPD	SaPD
Trust (vs. mistrust)	Low	—N/a	—N/a	Low	—N/a	High	Low	—N/a	High	—N/a	—N/a	Low	High	Low
Straightforwardness (vs. deception)	Low	—N/a	—N/a	Low	—N/a	—N/a	Low	—N/a	—N/a	—N/a	Low	—N/a	High	Low
Altruism (vs. exploitative)	Low	—N/a	—N/a	Low	—N/a	—N/a	Low	—N/a	High	—N/a	—N/a	—N/a	High	Low
Compliance (vs. aggression)	Low	—N/a	—N/a	Low	—N/a	—N/a	Low	—N/a	High	—N/a	Low	—N/a	High	Low
Modesty (vs. arrogance)	—N/a	—N/a	—N/a	Low	—N/a	—N/a	Low	High	High	—N/a	—N/a	High	High	Low
Tender-mindedness (vs. tough-minded)	Low	—N/a	—N/a	Low	—N/a	—N/a	Low	—N/a	High	—N/a	—N/a	—N/a	—N/a	Low

Conscientiousness (vs. disinhibition)
Factors	PPD	SzPD	StPD	ASPD	BPD	HPD	NPD	AvPD	DPD	OCPD	PAPD	DpPD	SDPD	SaPD
Competence (vs. laxness)	—N/a	—N/a	—N/a	—N/a	—N/a	—N/a	—N/a	—N/a	—N/a	High	Low	—N/a	Low	High
Order (vs. disorderly)	—N/a	—N/a	Low	—N/a	—N/a	—N/a	—N/a	—N/a	—N/a	High	High	Low	—N/a	—N/a
Dutifulness (vs. irresponsibility)	—N/a	—N/a	—N/a	Low	—N/a	—N/a	—N/a	—N/a	—N/a	High	Low	High	High	—N/a
Achievement striving (vs. lackadaisical)	—N/a	Low	—N/a	—N/a	—N/a	—N/a	—N/a	—N/a	—N/a	High	—N/a	—N/a	High	Low
Self-discipline (vs. negligence)	—N/a	—N/a	—N/a	Low	—N/a	Low	—N/a	—N/a	—N/a	High	Low	—N/a	High	Low
Deliberation (vs. rashness)	—N/a	—N/a	—N/a	Low	Low	Low	—N/a	—N/a	—N/a	High	—N/a	High	High	Low

Abbreviations used: PPD – Paranoid personality disorder, SzPD – Schizoid personality disorder, StPD – Schizotypal personality disorder, ASPD – Antisocial personality disorder, BPD – Borderline personality disorder, HPD – Histrionic personality disorder, NPD – Narcissistic personality disorder, AvPD – Avoidant personality disorder, DPD – Dependent personality disorder, OCPD – Obsessive–compulsive personality disorder, PAPD – Passive–aggressive personality disorder, DpPD – Depressive personality disorder, SDPD – Self-defeating personality disorder, SaPD – Sadistic personality disorder, and n/a – not available.

A prototype diagnostic technique has been developed in which Five-Factor-based prototypes for each disorder were created, based on the aggregated ratings of personality disorder experts. These prototypes agree well with DSM diagnostic criteria. The Five-Factor prototypes also reflected the high comorbidity rates of personality disorders. This is explained by the idea that various other disorders tap into dimensions that overlap with those of the primary diagnosis.

Another Five-Factor based technique involves diagnosing personality disorders based on clinician ratings of various facets of the five factors (e.g. self-consciousness, which falls under the neuroticism factor; excitement seeking, which falls under the extraversion factor). This technique is partially based on the prototype model, as each facet's "score" is based on its rating of how prototypical it is of each personality disorder, with prototypically low facets (with a score less than 2) reverse-scored. Using this technique, diagnosis is based on an individual's summed score across relevant facets. This summed-score technique has been shown to be as sensitive as the prototype technique, and the easier computation method makes it a useful suggested screening technique.

The Five-Factor assessment of personality disorders has also been correlated with the Psychopathy Resemblance Index of the NEO Personality Inventory, as well as with the individual personality dimensions of the NEO-PI-R. It also resolves several issues regarding the PCL-R psychopathy assessment, as a Five-Factor-based re-interpretation of the PCL-R factor structure shows that the "Aggressive Narcissism" factor taps into facets of low agreeableness (with some contribution of facets of neuroticism and extraversion), and the "Socially deviant lifestyle" factor represents facets of low conscientiousness and low agreeableness. It has also been shown that the sex differences in personality disorders can be reasonably predicted by sex differences in Big 5 traits.

In her seminal review of the personality disorder literature published in 2007, Lee Anna Clark asserted that "the five-factor model of personality is widely accepted as representing the higher-order structure of both normal and abnormal personality traits". The five factor model has been shown to significantly predict all 10 personality disorder symptoms and outperform the Minnesota Multiphasic Personality Inventory (MMPI) in the prediction of borderline, avoidant, and dependent personality disorder symptoms.

===== Criticism =====
The dimension of openness to experience of the Five-Factor model has been criticized for not directly relating to any of the major characteristics of personality disorders in the same way as do the other four dimensions. It has been suggested that schizotypal and histrionic personality disorders could be partially characterized by high levels of openness to experience (in the forms of openness to ideas and feelings, respectively), while obsessive-compulsive, paranoid, schizoid, and avoidant personality disorders can all be conceptualized by extremely low levels of openness. However, there is little to no empirical support for this hypothesis, particularly with schizotypal personality disorder. Additionally, the Openness scale of the NEO-PI-R, which is one of the most widely used measures of Big Five traits, was based on research and theory which viewed openness (such as self-actualization and personal growth) as beneficial, so measurement of extreme openness using the NEO-PI-R, is actually a marker of good mental health.

==== Seven factor model ====
The Five-Factor approach has been criticized for being limited in some respects in its conceptualization of personality disorders. This limitation is due to the fact that it does not include evaluative trait terms such as "bad", "awful", or "vicious". Some research has suggested that two evaluative dimensions should be added to the Five-Factor model of personality disorders. Empirical support for this approach comes from factor analyses that include the Big Five factors and evaluative terms. These analyses show that the evaluative terms contribute to two additional factors, one each for positive and negative valence. The addition of these two factors resolves much of the ambiguity of the openness dimension in the Five-Factor approach, as the openness factor changes to a conventionality factor, and adjectives such as "odd", "strange", and "weird" (which all characterize schizotypal personality disorder) fall onto the negative valence factor. These results indicate that the inclusion of evaluative terms and valence dimensions can be valuable for better describing the extreme and maladaptive levels of personality traits that comprise personality disorder profiles.

==== Internalizing/Externalizing model ====
A two-factor model of psychopathology in general has also been suggested, in which most disorders fall along internalizing and externalizing dimensions, which encompass mood and anxiety disorders, and antisocial personality and substance use disorders, respectively. Although this approach was originally developed to understand psychopathology in general, it has often been focused to apply to personality disorders, such as borderline personality disorder to help better understand patterns of comorbidity.

==== Szondi drive theory ====
Hungarian psychiatrist Léopold Szondi formulated in 1935 a dimensional model of personality comprising four dimensions and eight drives ("facets" in DSM V terminology). It was based on a drive theory, in which the four dimensions correspond to the independent hereditary circular mental diseases established by the psychiatric genetics of the time: the schizoform (containing the paranoid and the catatonic drives), the manic-depressive (for the "contact" dimension), the paroxysmal (including the epileptic and hysteric drives), and the sexual drive disorder (including the hermaphrodite and the sadomasochist drives). The Sex (S) and Contact (C) dimensions can be further grouped as representing pulsions at the border with the outer world, while the Paroximal (P) and Schizoform (Sch) dimensions at the inner part of the psyche.

=== Integrated models ===
==== Network analysis ====
Network analysis diverts most strongly from the categorical approach because it assumes that the symptoms of a disorder have a causal relationship to each other. This theoretical assumption is made because no mental disorder can currently be understood as existing independently from its symptoms, as other medical diseases can be. According to the network approach symptoms are not looked at as the product of a set of latent disorders, instead they are looked at as mutually interacting and reciprocally reinforcing elements within a wider network. Therefore, a diagnosis is not needed to understand why the symptoms hang together. Clusters of densely connected symptoms can be defined as disorders, but they are inevitably intertwined with related symptoms and cannot be entirely separated. This helps explain the growing body of research showing comorbidity, co-occurring genetic markers and co-occurring symptoms across personality disorders.

===== Therapeutic consequences =====
The therapeutic consequence of this is that treatment is targeted at the symptoms themselves and the causal relations between them, not the overarching diagnosis. This is because targeting the diagnosis is trying to treat an unspecified summary of a complex collection of causes. Adopting this attitude sits well with the therapeutic treatments in use at the moment that have the strongest evidence base.

===== Network construction =====
Network analysis has its roots in mathematics and physics but is increasingly being used in other areas. Essentially it is a method of analyzing mutually interacting entities by represented them as nodes which are connected to through relations called edges. Edges represent any sort of relation such as a partial correlation. Complex network analyses of other subjects have looked at tipping points, where one system suddenly transitions into another, such as when a tropical forests goes into a savannah. If these could be identified in individual's psychopathological dynamic networks then they could be used to determine when a person's network is on the brink of collapse and what can be done to alter it.

===== Criticisms =====
There are concerns that the network modal does not have enough parsimony and is too difficult to interpret.

== In diagnostic manuals ==
=== DSM-5 ===
The Personality and Personality Disorder Work Group proposed a combination categorical-dimensional model of personality disorder assessment that will be adopted in the DSM-5. The Work Group's model includes 5 higher-order domains (negative affectivity, detachment, antagonism, disinhibition, and psychoticism) and 25 lower-order facets, or constellations of trait behaviors that constitute the broader domains. The personality domains can also be extended to describe the personality of non-personality disorder patients. Diagnosis of personality disorders will be based on levels of personality dysfunction and assessment of pathological levels of one or more of the personality domains, resulting in classification into one of six personality disorder "types" or Personality Disorder - Trait Specified (depending on the levels of traits present), in contrast to the current traditional categorical diagnoses of one of 10 personality disorders (or personality disorder not otherwise specified) based on the presence or absence of symptoms.

==== Criticism ====
There are concerns that the addition of dimensional models to DSM-5 may raise confusion. Carole Lieberman has stated that "As it is now, people don't really make use of the subcategories that there are to describe severity of symptoms. Instead, I see this as a tool that insurance companies could well co-opt to try to deny benefits."

=== ICD-11 ===
The ICD-11 personality disorder section, which is based on a dimensional approach, differs substantially from the previous edition, ICD-10. All distinct PDs have been merged into one: personality disorder, which can be coded as mild, moderate, severe, or severity unspecified. Severity is determined by the level of distress experienced and degree of impact on day to day activities which results from difficulties in functioning aspects of self, (i.e., identity and agency) and interpersonal relationships. There is also an additional category called personality difficulty, which can be used to describe personality traits that are problematic, but do not meet the diagnostic criteria for a PD. A personality disorder or difficulty can be specified by one or more prominent personality traits or patterns. The ICD-11 uses five trait domains:

1. Negative affectivity – including inappropriate anger, crying, anxiety, remorse, dependent attachment styles, negativistic attitudes, suicidal ideation, mistrustfulness, worthlessness, low self-esteem, and emotional instability
2. Detachment – including social detachment and emotional coldness
3. Dissociality – including superior grandiosity, egocentricity, callousness, deception, exploitativeness and aggression
4. Disinhibition – including risk-taking, substance misuse, gambling, reckless driving, impulsivity, irresponsibility and distractibility
5. Anankastia – including rigid obsessive compulsions, intransigent control over behaviour and affect, and rigid perfectionism
