= Big Five personality traits =

Personality model consisting of five broad dimensions

The Big Five personality traits

In psychology and psychometrics, the Big Five personality trait model or five-factor model (FFM), sometimes called by the mnemonic acronym OCEAN or CANOE, is a scientific model for measuring and describing human personality traits. The framework groups variation in personality into five separate factors, all measured on a continuous scale:

- openness (O) measures creativity, curiosity, and willingness to entertain new ideas.
- conscientiousness (C) measures self-control, diligence, and attention to detail.
- extraversion (E) measures boldness, energy, and social interactivity.
- agreeableness (A) measures kindness, helpfulness, and willingness to cooperate.
- neuroticism (N) measures depression, irritability, and proneness to anxiety.

The five-factor model was developed using empirical research into the language people used to describe themselves, which found patterns and relationships between the words people use to describe themselves. For example, because someone described as "hard-working" is more likely to be described as "prepared" and less likely to be described as "messy", all three traits are grouped under conscientiousness. Using dimensionality reduction techniques, psychologists showed that most (though not all) of the variance in human personality can be explained using only these five factors.

Today, the five-factor model underlies most contemporary personality research, and has replaced theoretically derived models of personality. The general structure of the five factors has been independently replicated across cultures and time, and they have predictive validity against external metrics other than self-reports such as ratings by others, job performance and academic success (predicted by conscientiousness), and self-harm and suicidal behavior (predicted by neuroticism).

Research into personality inventories found five broad dimensions could explain most variation in human personality and temperament, with more-detailed analyses typically dividing the traits into more specific subfactors. For example, extraversion is typically associated with qualities such as gregariousness, assertiveness, excitement-seeking, warmth, activity, and positive emotions. Other models, like HEXACO, supplement the Big 5 traits with additional variables, trading off complexity for model fit.

== History ==
The Big Five model originated from the lexical hypothesis, which suggests that the most important personality traits are encoded in language. Raymond Cattell built upon earlier lexical work by reducing thousands of descriptors to 16 personality factors, later clustered into five global traits, which some consider the "original Big Five". Ernest Tupes and Raymond Christal then analyzed peer ratings of U.S. Air Force officers and derived five core dimensions: Surgency, Agreeableness, Dependability, Emotional Stability, and Culture—an approach later popularized by Warren Norman. In the 1980s, John M. Digman and colleagues consolidated evidence from previous studies and reaffirmed five major traits, while Paul Costa Jr and Robert R. McCrae developed the NEO model, starting with three factors and expanding it into the widely accepted Five Factor Model (FFM). These four sets of researchers used somewhat different methods in finding the five traits, making the sets of five factors have varying names and meanings. However, all have been found to be strongly correlated with their corresponding factors.

In 1884, British scientist Sir Francis Galton became the first person known to consider deriving a comprehensive taxonomy of human personality traits by sampling language. The idea that this may be possible is known as the lexical hypothesis.

British-American psychologist William McDougall of Duke University proposed five factors in 1929. In 1932, these "five distinguishable but inseparable factors" were listed as "intellect, character, temperament, disposition and temper", and have been seen as "anticipating" the adoption of the Big Five model in subsequent years.

Swiss psychologist Franziska Baumgarten of the University of Bern implemented the lexical hypothesis, publishing the first psycholexical classification of personality-descriptive terms in 1933. Using dictionaries and characterology publications, she identified 1093 separate terms in the German language used for the description of personality and mental states.

In 1936, American psychologists Gordon Allport of Harvard University and Henry Odbert of Dartmouth College implemented the lexical hypothesis using the English language. They organised for three anonymous people to categorise adjectives from Webster's New International Dictionary and a list of common slang words. The result was a list of 4504 adjectives they believed were descriptive of observable and relatively permanent traits.

In 1943, British-American psychologist Raymond Cattell of Harvard University took Allport and Odbert's list and reduced this to a list of roughly 160 terms by eliminating words with very similar meanings. To these, he added terms from 22 other psychological categories, and additional "interest" and "abilities" terms. This resulted in a list of 171 traits. From this he used factor analysis to derive 60 "personality clusters or syndromes" and an additional 7 minor clusters. Cattell then narrowed this down to 35 terms, and later added a 36th factor in the form of an IQ measure. Through factor analysis from 1945 to 1948, he created 11 or 12 factor solutions.

In 1947, German-British psychologist Hans Eysenck of University College London published his book Dimensions of Personality. He posited that the two most important personality dimensions were "Extraversion" and "Neuroticism", a term that he coined.

In July 1949, American psychologist Donald Fiske of the University of Chicago used 22 terms either directly taken or adapted from Cattell's 1947 study, and through surveys of male university students and statistics derived five factors: "Social Adaptability", "Emotional Control", "Conformity", "Inquiring Intellect", and "Confident Self-expression".

In the same year, Cattell, (with Maurice Tatsuoka and Herbert Eber), found 4 factors in addition to those they had found before, which they believed consisted of information that could only be provided through self-rating. With this understanding, they created and published the sixteen factor 16PF Questionnaire.

In 1953, John W French of Educational Testing Service published an extensive meta-analysis of personality trait factor studies.

In 1957, Ernest Tupes and Raymond Christal, research psychologists at the Lackland Air Force Base, undertook a personality trait study of US Air Force officers. Each was rated by their peers using Cattell's 35 terms (or in some cases, the 30 most reliable terms). In 1958, Tupes and Christal began a US Air Force study by taking 37 personality factors and other data found in Cattell's 1947 paper, Fiske's 1949 paper, and Tupes' 1957 paper. Through statistical analysis, they derived five factors they labeled "Surgency", "Agreeableness", "Dependability", "Emotional Stability", and "Culture". In addition to the influence of Cattell and Fiske's work, they strongly noted the influence of French's 1953 study. Tupes and Christal further tested and explained their 1958 work in a 1961 paper.

Warren Norman of the University of Michigan replicated Tupes and Christal's work in 1963. He relabeled "Surgency" as "Extroversion or Surgency", and "Dependability" as "Conscientiousness". He also found four subordinate scales for each factor. Norman's paper was much more read than Tupes and Christal's papers had been. Norman's later Oregon Research Institute colleague Lewis Goldberg continued this work.

In the 4th edition of the 16PF Questionnaire released in 1968, 5 "global factors" derived from the 16 factors were identified: "Extraversion", "Independence", "Anxiety", "Self-control" and "Tough-mindedness". 16PF advocates have since called these "the original big five".

Six factors were found to be present in Finnish people by Jorma Kuusinen of the University of Jyvaskyla in 1969, "Trustworthiness", "Self-confidence", "Rationality", "Uniqueness", "Tolerance", and "Sociability".

In 1978, Paul Costa and Robert McCrae of the National Institutes of Health published a book chapter describing their Neuroticism-Extraversion-Openness (NEO) model. The model was based on the three factors in its name. They used Eysenck's concept of "Extraversion" rather than Carl Jung's. Each factor had six facets. The authors expanded their explanation of the model in subsequent papers.

Also in 1978, British psychologist Peter Saville of Brunel University applied statistical analysis to 16PF results, and determined that the model could be reduced to five factors, "Anxiety", "Extraversion", "Warmth", "Imagination" and "Conscientiousness".

At a 1980 symposium in Honolulu, Lewis Goldberg, Naomi Takemoto-Chock, Andrew Comrey, and John M. Digman, reviewed the available personality instruments of the day. In 1981, Digman and Takemoto-Chock of the University of Hawaiʻi reanalysed data from Cattell, Tupes, Norman, Fiske and Digman. They re-affirmed the validity of the five factors, naming them "Friendly Compliance vs. Hostile Non-compliance", "Extraversion vs. Introversion", "Ego Strength vs. Emotional Disorganization", "Will to Achieve" and "Intellect". They also found weak evidence for the existence of a sixth factor, "Culture".

1981 also saw Lewis Goldberg coin the term "Big Five" for the factors.

Peter Saville and his team included a five-factor "Pentagon" model as part of the Occupational Personality Questionnaires (OPQ) in 1984. This was the first commercially available Big Five test. Its factors are "Extroversion", "Vigorous", "Methodical", "Emotional Stability", and "Abstract".

This was closely followed by another commercial test, the NEO PI three-factor personality inventory, published by Costa and McCrae in 1985. It used the three NEO factors. The methodology employed in constructing the NEO instruments has since been subject to critical scrutiny.

In 1990, J.M. Digman of the University of Hawaii further advanced his five-factor model of personality, which Goldberg put at the highest organised level, and was highly cited.

In 1992, the NEO PI evolved into the NEO PI-R, adding the factors "Agreeableness" and "Conscientiousness", and becoming a Big Five instrument. This set the names for the factors that are now most commonly used. The NEO maintainers called their model the "Five Factor Model" (FFM). Each NEO personality dimension has six subordinate facets.

Wim Hofstee at the University of Groningen used a lexical hypothesis approach with the Dutch language to develop what became the International Personality Item Pool in the 1990s. Further development in Germany and the United States saw the pool based on three languages. Its questions and results have been mapped to various Big Five personality typing models.

Kibeom Lee and Michael Ashton released a book describing their HEXACO model in 2004. It adds a sixth factor, "Honesty-Humility" to the five (which it calls "Emotionality", "Extraversion", "Agreeableness", "Conscientiousness", and "Openness to Experience"). Each of these factors has four facets.

In 2007, Colin DeYoung, Lena C. Quilty and Jordan Peterson concluded that the 10 aspects of the Big Five may have distinct biological substrates. This was derived through factor analyses of two data samples with the International Personality Item Pool, followed by cross-correlation with scores derived from 10 genetic factors identified as underlying the shared variance among the Revised NEO Personality Inventory facets.

By 2009, personality and social psychologists generally agreed that both personal and situational variables are needed to account for human behavior.

An FFM-associated test was used by Cambridge Analytica, and was part of the "psychographic profiling" controversy during the 2016 US presidential election.

== Descriptions of the particular personality traits ==
When factor analysis is applied to personality survey data, semantic associations between aspects of personality and specific terms are often applied to the same person. For example, someone described as conscientious is more likely to be described as "always prepared" rather than "messy". These associations use terms from common language to describe the human personality, temperament, and psyche. These traits are not black and white; each one is a spectrum, with personality varying continuously across each of these dimensions (unlike in the MBTI inventory).

Beneath each proposed global factor, there are a number of correlated and more specific primary factors. For example, extraversion is typically associated with qualities such as gregariousness, assertiveness, excitement-seeking, warmth, activity, and positive emotions.

=== Openness to experience ===
Openness to experience is a general appreciation for art, emotion, adventure, unusual ideas, imagination, curiosity, and variety of experience. People who are open to experience are intellectually curious, open to emotion, sensitive to beauty, and willing to try new things. They tend to be, when compared to closed people, more creative and more aware of their feelings. They are also more likely to hold unconventional beliefs. Open people can be perceived as unpredictable or lacking focus, and more likely to engage in risky behaviour or drug-taking. Moreover, individuals with high openness are said to pursue self-actualisation specifically by seeking out intense, euphoric experiences. Conversely, those with low openness want to be fulfilled by persevering and are characterised as pragmatic and data-driven – sometimes even perceived to be dogmatic and closed-minded. Some disagreement remains about how to interpret and contextualise the openness factor as there is a lack of biological support for this particular trait. Openness has not shown a significant association with any brain regions as opposed to the other four traits which did when using brain imaging to detect changes in volume associated with each trait.

==== Sample items ====
- I have a rich vocabulary.
- I have a vivid imagination.
- I have excellent ideas.
- I am quick to understand things.
- I use difficult words.
- I spend time reflecting on things.
- I am full of ideas.
- I have difficulty understanding abstract ideas. (Reversed)
- I am not interested in abstract ideas. (Reversed)
- I do not have a good imagination. (Reversed)

=== Conscientiousness ===
Conscientiousness is a tendency to be self-disciplined, act dutifully, and strive for achievement against measures or outside expectations. It is related to people's level of impulse control, regulation, and direction. High conscientiousness is often perceived as being stubborn and focused. Low conscientiousness is associated with flexibility and spontaneity, but can also appear as sloppiness and lack of reliability. High conscientiousness indicates a preference for planned rather than spontaneous behaviour.

==== Sample items ====
- I am always prepared.
- I pay attention to details.
- I get chores done right away.
- I like order.
- I follow a schedule.
- I am exacting in my work.
- I leave my belongings around. (Reversed)
- I make a mess of things. (Reversed)
- I often forget to put things back in their proper place. (Reversed)
- I shirk my duties. (Reversed)

=== Extraversion ===
Extraversion is characterised by breadth of activities (as opposed to depth), surgency from external activities/situations, and energy creation from external means. The trait is marked by pronounced engagement with the external world. Extraverts enjoy interacting with people, and are often perceived as energetic. They tend to be enthusiastic and action-oriented. They possess high group visibility, like to talk, and assert themselves. Extraverts may appear more dominant in social settings, as opposed to introverts in that setting.

Introverts have lower social engagement and energy levels than extraverts. They tend to seem quiet, low-key, deliberate, and less involved in the social world. Their lack of social involvement should not be interpreted as shyness or depression, but as greater independence of their social world than extraverts. Introverts need less stimulation and more time alone than extraverts. This does not mean that they are unfriendly or antisocial; rather, they are aloof and reserved in social situations.

Generally, people are a combination of extraversion and introversion, with personality psychologist Hans Eysenck suggesting a model by which differences in their brains produce these traits.

==== Sample items ====
- I am the life of the party.
- I feel comfortable around people.
- I start conversations.
- I talk to a lot of different people at parties.
- I do not mind being the center of attention.
- I do not talk a lot. (Reversed)
- I keep in the background. (Reversed)
- I have little to say. (Reversed)
- I do not like to draw attention to myself. (Reversed)
- I am quiet around strangers. (Reversed)

=== Agreeableness ===
Agreeableness is the general concern for social harmony. Agreeable individuals value getting along with others. They are generally considerate, kind, generous, trusting and trustworthy, helpful, and willing to compromise their interests with others. Agreeable people also have an optimistic view of human nature. Agreeableness is associated with mental health.

Disagreeable individuals place self-interest above getting along with others. They are generally unconcerned with others' well-being and are less likely to extend themselves for other people. Sometimes their skepticism about others' motives causes them to be suspicious, unfriendly, and uncooperative. Disagreeable people are often competitive or challenging, which can be seen as argumentative or untrustworthy.

Because agreeableness is a social trait, research has shown that one's agreeableness positively correlates with the quality of relationships with one's team members. Agreeableness also positively predicts transformational leadership skills. In a study conducted among 169 participants in leadership positions in a variety of professions, individuals were asked to take a personality test and be directly evaluated by supervised subordinates. Very agreeable leaders were more likely to be considered transformational rather than transactional. Although the relationship was not strong (r=0.32, β=0.28, p<0.01), it was the strongest of the Big Five traits. However, the same study could not predict leadership effectiveness as evaluated by the leader's direct supervisor.

Conversely, agreeableness has been found to be negatively related to transactional leadership in the military. A study of Asian military units showed that agreeable people are more likely to be poor transactional leaders. Therefore, with further research, organisations may be able to determine an individual's potential for performance based on their personality traits. For instance, in their journal article "Which Personality Attributes Are Most Important in the Workplace?" Paul Sackett and Philip Walmsley claim that conscientiousness and agreeableness are "important to success across many different jobs."

==== Sample items ====
- I am interested in people.
- I sympathise with others' feelings.
- I have a soft heart.
- I take time out for others.
- I feel others' emotions.
- I make people feel at ease.
- I am not really interested in others. (Reversed)
- I insult people. (Reversed)
- I am not interested in other people's problems. (Reversed)
- I feel little concern for others. (Reversed)

=== Neuroticism ===
Neuroticism is the tendency to have strong negative emotions, such as anger, anxiety, or depression. It is sometimes called emotional instability, or is reversed and referred to as emotional stability.

Neuroticism is a classic temperament trait that has been studied in temperament research for decades, even before it was adapted by the Five Factor Model. For example, in Hans Eysenck's (1967) theory of personality, neuroticism is associated with low tolerance for stress (N+ in the FFM) or a strong dislike of change (O- in the FFM). Neuroticism in the FFM is similar but not identical to being neurotic in the Freudian sense (i.e., neurosis). Some psychologists prefer to call neuroticism by the term emotional instability to differentiate it from the term neurotic in a career test.

Neurotic people are emotionally volatile, emotionally reactive and vulnerable to stress. They are more likely to spontaneously experience negative emotions (see sample items below) and their negative emotional reactions tend to stay for longer periods of time, which means they are more often in a bad mood. They are more likely to interpret ordinary situations as threatening. They can perceive minor frustrations as hopelessly difficult. For instance, neuroticism is connected to pessimism toward work, to certainty that work hinders personal relationships, and to higher levels of anxiety from the pressures at work. Furthermore, highly neurotic people may display more skin-conductance reactivity than less neurotic people. These problems in emotional regulation can make a highly neurotic person think less clearly, make worse decisions, and cope less effectively with stress. Being disappointed with one's life achievements can make one more neurotic and increase one's chances of falling into clinical depression. Moreover, neurotic individuals tend to experience more negative life events, but neuroticism also changes in response to positive and negative life experiences. Also, neurotic people tend to have worse psychological well-being.

At the other end of the scale, less neurotic individuals are less easily upset and are less emotionally reactive. They tend to be calm, emotionally stable, and free from persistent negative feelings. Freedom from negative feelings does not mean that low scorers experience a lot of positive feelings; that is related to extraversion instead.

==== Sample items ====
- I get stressed out easily.
- I worry about things.
- I am easily disturbed.
- I get upset easily.
- I change my mood a lot.
- I have frequent mood swings.
- I get irritated easily.
- I often feel blue.
- I am relaxed most of the time. (Reversed)
- I seldom feel blue. (Reversed)

== Measurement and methodology ==
=== Versions ===
Several measures of the Big Five exist:

- International Personality Item Pool (IPIP)
- NEO-PI-R
- The Ten-Item Personality Inventory (TIPI) and the Five Item Personality Inventory (FIPI) are very abbreviated rating forms of the Big Five personality traits.
- Self-descriptive sentence questionnaires
- Lexical questionnaires
- Self-report questionnaires
- Relative-scored big five measure

The most frequently used measures of the Big Five comprise either items that are self-descriptive sentences or, in the case of lexical measures, items that are single adjectives. Due to the length of sentence-based and some lexical measures, short forms have been developed and validated for use in applied research settings where questionnaire space and respondent time are limited, such as the 40-item balanced International English Big-Five Mini-Markers or a very brief (10 item) measure of the Big Five domains. Research has suggested that some methodologies in administering personality tests are inadequate in length and provide insufficient detail to truly evaluate personality. Usually, longer, more detailed questions will give a more accurate portrayal of personality. The five factor structure has been replicated in peer reports. However, many of the substantive findings rely on self-reports.

==== Limitations of self-report ====
Much of the evidence on the measures of the big five relies on self-report questionnaires, which makes self-report bias and falsification of responses difficult to deal with and account for. It has been argued that the Big Five tests do not create an accurate personality profile because the responses given on these tests are not true in all cases and can be falsified. For example, questionnaires are answered by potential employees who might choose answers that paint them in the best light.

Research suggests that a relative-scored Big Five measure in which respondents had to make repeated choices between equally desirable personality descriptors may be a potential alternative to traditional Big Five measures in accurately assessing personality traits, especially when lying or biased responding is present. When compared with a traditional Big Five measure for its ability to predict GPA and creative achievement under both normal and "fake good"-bias response conditions, the relative-scored measure significantly and consistently predicted these outcomes under both conditions; however, the Likert questionnaire lost its predictive ability in the faking condition. Thus, the relative-scored measure proved to be less affected by biased responding than the Likert measure of the Big Five.

==== Labels and dimensionality ====
The five overarching domains of the big five model have been found to contain most known personality traits and are assumed to represent the basic structure behind them all. Research into personality inventories found five broad dimensions could explain most variation in human personality and temperament, with more-detailed analyses typically dividing the traits into more specific subfactors. For example, extraversion is typically associated with qualities such as gregariousness, assertiveness, excitement-seeking, warmth, activity, and positive emotions. Other models, like HEXACO, supplement the big five traits with additional variables.

Factor analysis, the statistical method used to identify the dimensional structure of observed variables, lacks a universally recognized basis for choosing among solutions with different numbers of factors. A five factor solution depends on some degree of interpretation by the analyst. A larger number of factors may underlie these five factors. This has led to disputes about the "true" number of factors. Big Five proponents have responded that although other solutions may be viable in a single data set, only the five-factor structure consistently replicates across different studies. Block argues that the use of factor analysis as the exclusive paradigm for conceptualizing personality is too limited.

Some research suggests that the Big Five should not be conceived of as dichotomies (such as extraversion vs. introversion) but as continua. Each individual has the capacity to move along each dimension as circumstances (social or temporal) change. Someone is therefore not simply on one end of each trait dichotomy but is a blend of both, exhibiting some characteristics more often than others: DeYoung proposed a model where each of the Big Five personality traits contains two separate, but correlated, aspects reflecting a level of personality below the broad domains but above the many facet scales also making up part of the Big Five. The aspects are labelled as follows: Volatility and Withdrawal for Neuroticism; Enthusiasm and Assertiveness for Extraversion; Intellect and Openness for Openness to Experience; Industriousness and Orderliness for Conscientiousness; and Compassion and Politeness for Agreeableness.

In many studies, the five factors are not fully orthogonal to one another; that is, the five factors are not independent. Orthogonality is viewed as desirable by some researchers because it minimizes redundancy between the dimensions. This is particularly important when the goal of a study is to provide a comprehensive description of personality with as few variables as possible. Cheung, van de Vijver, and Leong (2011) suggest that the Openness factor is particularly unsupported in Asian countries and that a different fifth factor is identified. Attempts to replicate the Big Five have succeeded in some countries but not in others. Some research suggests, for instance, that Hungarians do not have a single agreeableness factor. Other researchers have found evidence for agreeableness but not for other factors. There may be debate as to what counts as personality and what does not and the nature of the questions in the survey greatly influence outcome. Multiple particularly broad question databases have failed to produce the Big Five as the top five traits.

The structure, manifestations, and development of the Big Five in childhood and adolescence have been studied using a variety of methods, including parent- and teacher-ratings, preadolescent and adolescent self- and peer-ratings, and observations of parent-child interactions. Results from these studies support the relative stability of personality traits across the human lifespan, at least from preschool age through adulthood. More specifically, research suggests that four of the Big Five – namely Extraversion, Neuroticism, Conscientiousness, and Agreeableness – reliably describe personality differences in childhood, adolescence, and adulthood. However, some evidence suggests that Openness may not be a fundamental, stable part of childhood personality. Although some researchers have found that Openness in children and adolescents relates to attributes such as creativity, curiosity, imagination, and intellect, many researchers have failed to find distinct individual differences in Openness in childhood and early adolescence. Potentially, Openness may (a) manifest in unique, currently unknown ways in childhood or (b) may only manifest as children develop socially and cognitively. Other studies have found evidence for all of the Big Five traits in childhood and adolescence as well as two other child-specific traits: Irritability and Activity. Despite these specific differences, the majority of findings suggest that personality traits – particularly Extraversion, Neuroticism, Conscientiousness, and Agreeableness – are evident in childhood and adolescence and are associated with distinct social-emotional patterns of behavior that are largely consistent with adult manifestations of those same personality traits. Some researchers have proposed the youth personality trait is best described by six trait dimensions: neuroticism, extraversion, openness to experience, agreeableness, conscientiousness, and activity. Despite some preliminary evidence for this "Little Six" model, research in this area has been delayed by a lack of available measures.

==== Gender differences ====
Some cross-cultural research has shown some patterns of gender differences on responses to the NEO-PI-R and the Big Five Inventory. For example, women consistently report higher Neuroticism, Agreeableness, warmth (an extraversion facet) and openness to feelings, and men often report higher assertiveness (a facet of extraversion) and openness to ideas as assessed by the NEO-PI-R.

A study of gender differences in 55 nations using the Big Five Inventory found that women tended to be somewhat higher than men in neuroticism, extraversion, agreeableness, and conscientiousness. The difference in neuroticism was the most prominent and consistent, with significant differences found in 49 of the 55 nations surveyed.

Gender differences in personality traits are largest in prosperous, healthy, and more gender-egalitarian nations. The explanation for this, as stated by the researchers of a 2001 paper, is that actions by women in individualistic, egalitarian countries are more likely to be attributed to their personality, rather than being attributed to ascribed gender roles within collectivist, traditional countries.

Measured differences in the magnitude of sex differences between more or less developed world regions were caused by the changes in the measured personalities of men, not women, in these respective regions. That is, men in highly developed world regions were less neurotic, less extraverted, less conscientious and less agreeable compared to men in less developed world regions. Women, on the other hand tended not to differ in personality traits across regions.

==== Birth-order differences ====
Frank Sulloway argues that firstborns are more conscientious, more socially dominant, less agreeable, and less open to new ideas compared to siblings that were born later. Large-scale studies using random samples and self-report personality tests, however, have found milder effects than Sulloway claimed, or no significant effects of birth order on personality. A study using the Project Talent data, which is a large-scale representative survey of American high school students, with 272,003 eligible participants, found statistically significant but very small effects (the average absolute correlation between birth order and personality was .02) of birth order on personality, such that firstborns were slightly more conscientious, dominant, and agreeable, while also being less neurotic and less sociable. Parental socioeconomic status and participant gender had much larger correlations with personality.

In 2002, the Journal of Psychology posted a Big Five Personality Trait Difference; where researchers explored the relationship between the five-factor model and the Universal-Diverse Orientation (UDO) in counselor trainees. (Thompson, R., Brossart, D., and Mivielle, A., 2002). UDO is known as one social attitude that produces a strong awareness and/or acceptance towards the similarities and differences among individuals. (Miville, M., Romas, J., Johnson, J., and Lon, R. 2002) The study found that the counselor trainees that are more open to the idea of creative expression (a facet of Openness to Experience, Openness to Aesthetics) among individuals are more likely to work with a diverse group of clients, and feel comfortable in their role.

==== Heritability ====
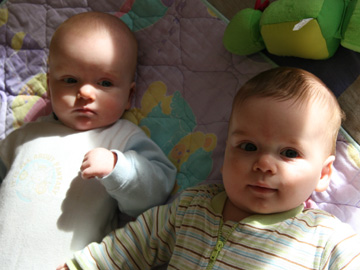
Personality research often uses twin studies to determine how much heritable and environmental factors contribute to the Big Five personality traits.

A 1996 behavioural genetics study of twins suggested that heritability (the degree of variation in a trait within a population that is due to genetic variation in that population) and environmental factors both influence all five factors to the same degree. Among four twin studies examined in 2003, the mean percentage for heritability was calculated for each personality and it was concluded that heritability influenced the five factors broadly. The self-report measures were as follows: openness to experience was estimated to have a 57% genetic influence, extraversion 54%, conscientiousness 49%, neuroticism 48%, and agreeableness 42%.

==== Non-humans ====
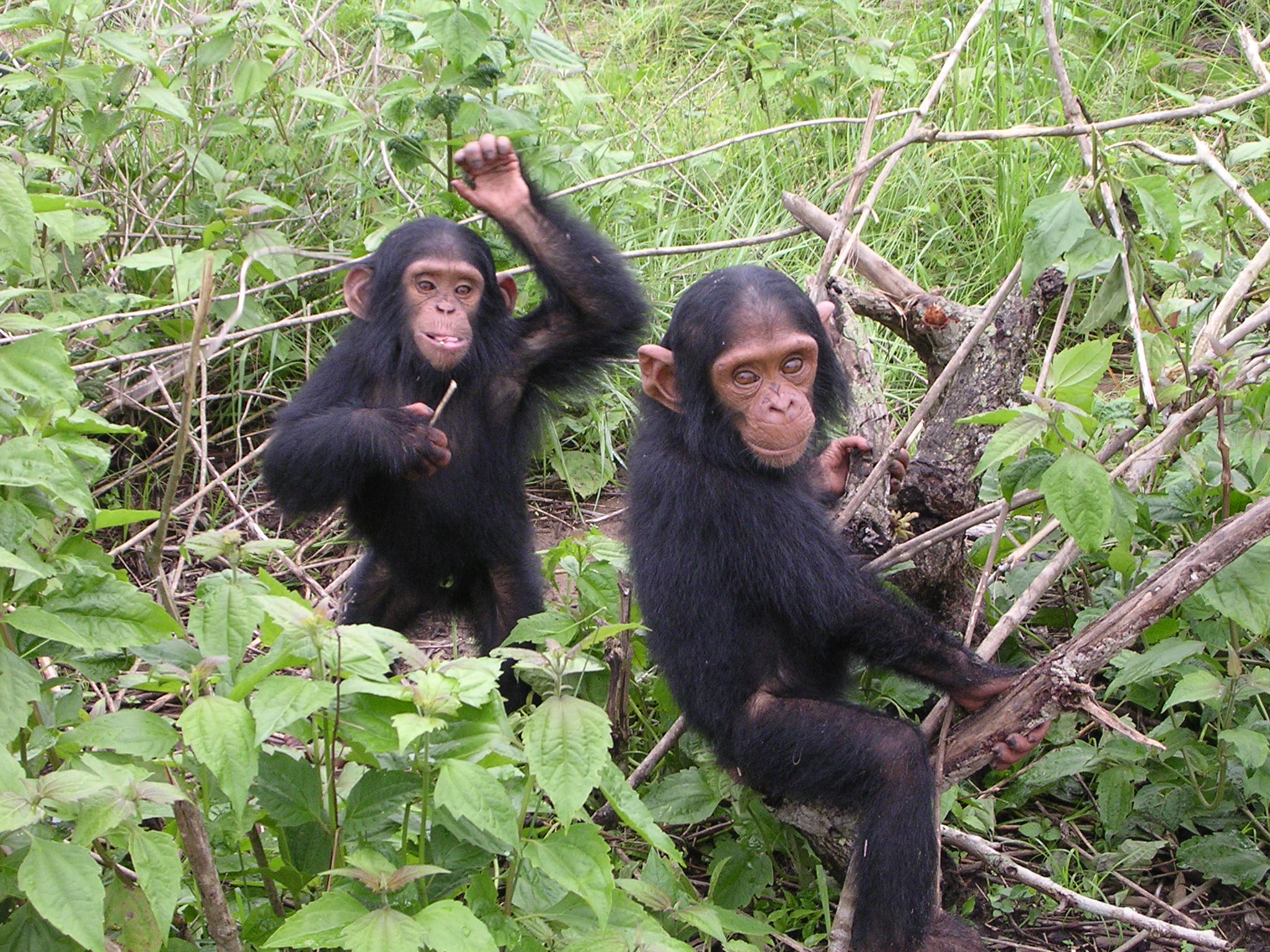
The Big Five personality traits can be seen in chimpanzees.

The Big Five personality traits have been assessed in some non-human species but methodology is debatable. In one series of studies, human ratings of chimpanzees using a scale designed for non-human apes, revealed factors of extraversion, conscientiousness and agreeableness– as well as an additional factor of dominance–across hundreds of chimpanzees in zoological parks, a large naturalistic sanctuary, and a research laboratory. Neuroticism and openness factors were found in an original zoo sample, but were not replicated in a new zoo sample or in other settings (perhaps reflecting the design of the assessment scale). A study review found that markers for the three dimensions extraversion, neuroticism, and agreeableness were found most consistently across different species, followed by openness; only chimpanzees showed markers for conscientious behavior.

A study completed in 2020 concluded that dolphins have some similar personality traits to humans. Both are large brained intelligent animals but have evolved separately for millions of years.

== Applications and uses ==
The Big Five model has become a dominant framework in contemporary personality psychology. Its wide acceptance stems from strong empirical support and its practical utility in both research and applied settings. However, its applicability is not universal, and several methodological and conceptual criticisms limit its effectiveness in certain contexts.

=== Clinical psychology and psychopathology ===
==== Dementia ====
Some diseases cause changes in personality. For example, although gradual memory impairment is the hallmark feature of Alzheimer's disease, a systematic review of personality changes in Alzheimer's disease by Robins Wahlin and Byrne, published in 2011, found systematic and consistent trait changes mapped to the Big Five. The largest change observed was a decrease in conscientiousness. The next most significant changes were an increase in Neuroticism and decrease in Extraversion, but Openness and Agreeableness were also decreased. These changes in personality could assist with early diagnosis.

A study published in 2023 found that the Big Five personality traits may also influence the quality of life experienced by people with Alzheimer's disease and other dementias, post diagnosis. In this study people with dementia with lower levels of Neuroticism self-reported higher quality of life than those with higher levels of Neuroticism while those with higher levels of the other four traits self-reported higher quality of life than those with lower levels of these traits. This suggests that as well as assisting with early diagnosis, the Big Five personality traits could help identify people with dementia potentially more vulnerable to adverse outcomes and inform personalized care planning and interventions.

==== Personality disorders ====
As of 2002, there were over fifty published studies relating the FFM to personality disorders. Since that time, quite a number of additional studies have expanded on this research base and provided further empirical support for understanding the DSM personality disorders in terms of the FFM domains. Beyond simply predicting symptoms, the Five-Factor Model has been formally proposed as a foundational framework for the classification of personality disorders within the Diagnostic and Statistical Manual of Mental Disorders (DSM-5), offering a dimensional approach to diagnosis alongside traditional categorical models. This proposal underscores its growing acceptance and utility in clinical psychology for understanding and assessing personality pathology.

In her review of the personality disorder literature published in 2007, Lee Anna Clark asserted that "the five-factor model of personality is widely accepted as representing the higher-order structure of both normal and abnormal personality traits". However, other researchers disagree that this model is widely accepted (see the section Critique below) and suggest that it simply replicates early temperament research. Noticeably, FFM publications never compare their findings to temperament models even though temperament and mental disorders (especially personality disorders) are thought to be based on the same neurotransmitter imbalances, just to varying degrees.

The five-factor model was claimed to significantly predict all ten personality disorder symptoms and outperform the Minnesota Multiphasic Personality Inventory (MMPI) in the prediction of borderline, avoidant, and dependent personality disorder symptoms. However, most predictions related to an increase in Neuroticism and a decrease in Agreeableness, and therefore did not differentiate between the disorders very well.

==== Common mental disorders ====
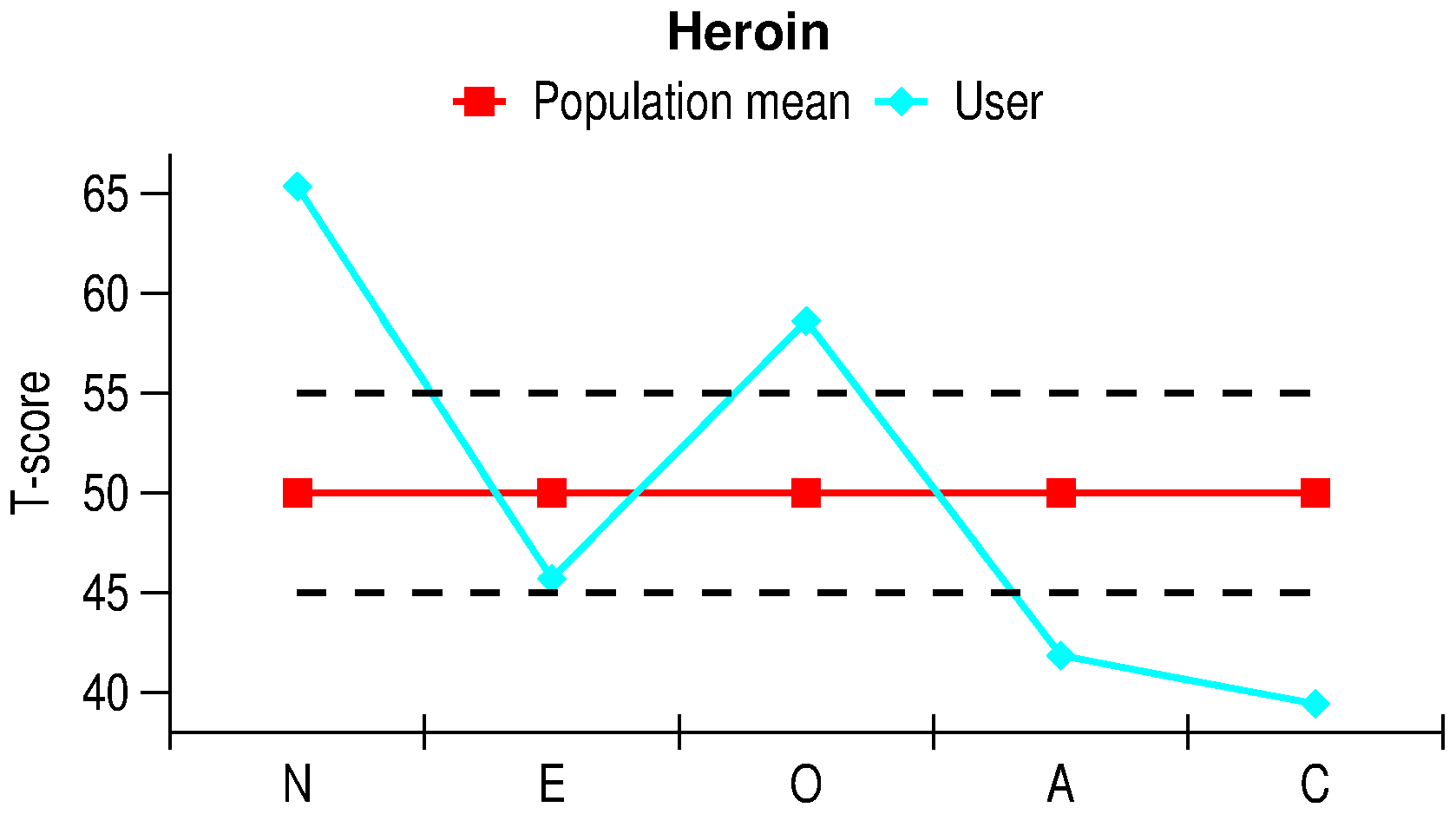
Average deviation of five factor personality profile of heroin users from the population mean. N stands for Neuroticism, E for Extraversion, O for Openness to experience, A for Agreeableness and C for Conscientiousness.

Converging evidence from several nationally representative studies has established three classes of mental disorders which are especially common in the general population: Depressive disorders (e.g., major depressive disorder (MDD), dysthymic disorder), anxiety disorders (e.g., generalized anxiety disorder (GAD), post-traumatic stress disorder (PTSD), panic disorder, agoraphobia, specific phobia, and social phobia), and substance use disorders (SUDs). The Five Factor personality profiles of users of different drugs may be different. For example, the typical profile for heroin users is ${\rm N}\Uparrow, {\rm O}\Uparrow, {\rm A}\Downarrow, {\rm C}\Downarrow$, whereas for ecstasy users the high level of N is not expected but E is higher: ${\rm E}\Uparrow, {\rm O}\Uparrow, {\rm A}\Downarrow, {\rm C}\Downarrow$.

These common mental disorders (CMDs) have been empirically linked to the Big Five personality traits, neuroticism in particular. Numerous studies have found that having high scores of neuroticism significantly increases one's risk for developing a common mental disorder. A large-scale meta-analysis (n > 75,000) examining the relationship between all of the Big Five personality traits and common mental disorders found that low conscientiousness yielded consistently strong effects for each common mental disorder examined (i.e., MDD, dysthymic disorder, GAD, PTSD, panic disorder, agoraphobia, social phobia, specific phobia, and SUD). This finding parallels research on physical health, which has established that conscientiousness is the strongest personality predictor of reduced mortality, and is highly negatively correlated with making poor health choices. In regards to the other personality domains, the meta-analysis found that all common mental disorders examined were defined by high neuroticism, most exhibited low extraversion, only SUD was linked to agreeableness (negatively), and no disorders were associated with Openness. A meta-analysis of 59 longitudinal studies showed that high neuroticism predicted the development of anxiety, depression, substance abuse, psychosis, schizophrenia, and non-specific mental distress, also after adjustment for baseline symptoms and psychiatric history.

Five major models have been posed to explain the nature of the relationship between personality and mental illness. There is currently no single "best model", as each of them has received at least some empirical support. These models are not mutually exclusive – more than one may be operating for a particular individual and various mental disorders may be explained by different models.

- The Vulnerability/Risk Model: According to this model, personality contributes to the onset or etiology of various common mental disorders. In other words, pre-existing personality traits either cause the development of CMDs directly or enhance the impact of causal risk factors. There is strong support for neuroticism being a robust vulnerability factor.
- The Pathoplasty Model: This model proposes that premorbid personality traits impact the expression, course, severity, and/or treatment response of a mental disorder. An example of this relationship would be a heightened likelihood of committing suicide in a depressed individual who also has low levels of constraint.
- The Common Cause Model: According to the common cause model, personality traits are predictive of CMDs because personality and psychopathology have shared genetic and environmental determinants which result in non-causal associations between the two constructs.
- The Spectrum Model: This model proposes that associations between personality and psychopathology are found because these two constructs both occupy a single domain or spectrum and psychopathology is simply a display of the extremes of normal personality function. Support for this model is provided by an issue of criteria overlap. For instance, two of the primary facet scales of neuroticism in the NEO-PI-R are "depression" and "anxiety". Thus the fact that diagnostic criteria for depression, anxiety, and neuroticism assess the same content increases the correlations between these domains.
- The Scar Model: According to the scar model, episodes of a mental disorder 'scar' an individual's personality, changing it in significant ways from premorbid functioning. An example of a scar effect would be a decrease in openness to experience following an episode of PTSD.

The predictive effects of the Big Five personality traits relate mostly to social functioning and rules-driven behavior and are not very specific for prediction of particular aspects of behavior. For example, it was noted by all temperament researchers that high neuroticism precedes the development of all common mental disorders and is not associated with personality. Further evidence is required to fully uncover the nature and differences between personality traits, temperament and life outcomes. Social and contextual parameters also play a role in outcomes and the interaction between the two is not yet fully understood. The dimensional trait models of the ICD‐11 and DSM‐5 Section III were explicitly made consistent with the FFM. The FFM is also the personality and temperament foundation for the Hierarchical Taxonomy of Psychopathology.

=== Career, education, and life transitions ===
Personality can sometimes be flexible and measuring the big five personality for individuals as they enter certain stages of life may predict their educational identity. Recent studies have suggested the likelihood of an individual's personality affecting their educational identity. It is also believed that the Big Five traits are predictors of future performance outcomes to varying degrees. Specific facets of the Big Five traits are also thought to be indicators of success in the workplace, and each individual facet can give a more precise indication as to the nature of a person. Different traits' facets are needed for different occupations. Various facets of the Big Five traits can predict the success of people in different environments. The estimated levels of an individual's success in jobs that require public speaking versus one-on-one interactions will differ according to whether that person has particular traits' facets.

==== Academic achievement ====
Personality plays an important role in academic achievement. A study of Israeli high-school students found that those in the gifted program systematically scored higher on openness and lower on neuroticism than those not in the gifted program. While not a measure of the Big Five, gifted students also reported less state anxiety than students not in the gifted program. Another study found that GPA and exam performance are both predicted by conscientiousness while neuroticism is negatively related to academic success. In addition, researchers found that chromosome differences contributed to weaker personality traits among females, resulting in them being more worried and stressed in comparison to their counterparts. Results of this study found female students to be more neurotic compared to male counterparts while still scoring higher in learning and achievements, as they may be influenced by many other factors.

==== Vocational and educational transitions ====
In a study, conscientiousness predicted success in the transition from secondary school to vocational education and training (VET). Extraversion predicted the final VET grade and obtaining a VET position; agreeableness was linked to a higher risk of dropout. Effect sizes were small but comparable to established predictors such as cognitive ability and parental socioeconomic status.

==== Learning styles ====
Learning styles have been described as "enduring ways of thinking and processing information". In 2008, the Association for Psychological Science (APS) commissioned a report that concludes that no significant evidence exists that learning-style assessments should be included in the education system. Thus it is premature, at best, to conclude that the evidence links the Big Five to "learning styles", or "learning styles" to learning itself. However, the APS report also suggested that all existing learning styles have not been exhausted and that there could exist learning styles worthy of being included in educational practices. There are studies that conclude that personality and thinking styles may be intertwined in ways that link thinking styles to the Big Five personality traits. There is no general consensus on the number or specifications of particular learning styles, but there have been many different proposals.

As one example, Schmeck, Ribich, and Ramanaiah (1997) defined four types of learning styles:

- synthesis analysis
- methodical study
- fact retention
- elaborative processing

When all four facets are implicated within the classroom, they will each likely improve academic achievement. A study of 308 undergraduates who completed the Five Factor Inventory Processes and reported their GPA suggested that conscientiousness and agreeableness have a positive relationship with all types of learning styles (synthesis-analysis, methodical study, fact retention, and elaborative processing), whereas neuroticism shows an inverse relationship. Moreover, extraversion and openness were proportional to elaborative processing. The Big Five personality traits accounted for 14% of the variance in GPA, suggesting that personality traits make some contributions to academic performance. Furthermore, reflective learning styles (synthesis-analysis and elaborative processing) were able to mediate the relationship between openness and GPA. These results indicate that intellectual curiosity significantly enhances academic performance if students combine their scholarly interest with thoughtful information processing.

By identifying learning strategies in individuals, learning and academic achievement can be improved, and a deeper understanding of information processing can be gained. This model asserts that students develop either agentic/shallow processing or reflective/deep processing. Deep processors are more often found to be more conscientious, intellectually open, and extraverted than shallow processors. Deep processing is associated with appropriate study methods (methodical study) and a stronger ability to analyze information (synthesis analysis), whereas shallow processors prefer structured fact retention learning styles and are better suited for elaborative processing. The main functions of these four specific learning styles are as follows:

Name	Function
Synthesis analysis	processing information, forming categories, and organizing them into hierarchies. This is the only one of the learning styles that has explained a significant impact on academic performance.
Methodical study	methodical behavior while completing academic assignments
Fact retention	focusing on the result instead of understanding the logic behind something
Elaborative processing	connecting and applying new ideas to existing knowledge

Openness has been linked to learning styles that often lead to academic success and higher grades like synthesis analysis and methodical study. Because conscientiousness and openness have been shown to predict all four learning styles, it suggests that individuals who possess characteristics like discipline, determination, and curiosity are more likely to engage in all of the above learning styles.

According to the research carried out by Komarraju, Karau, Schmeck & Avdic (2011), conscientiousness and agreeableness are positively related with all four learning styles, whereas neuroticism was negatively related with those four. Furthermore, extraversion and openness were only positively related to elaborative processing, and openness itself correlated with higher academic achievement.

In addition, a previous study by psychologist Mikael Jensen has shown relationships between the Big Five personality traits, learning, and academic achievement. According to Jensen, all personality traits, except neuroticism, are associated with learning goals and motivation. Openness and conscientiousness influence individuals to learn to a high degree unrecognized, while extraversion and agreeableness have similar effects. Conscientiousness and neuroticism also influence individuals to perform well in front of others for a sense of credit and reward, while agreeableness forces individuals to avoid this strategy of learning. Jensen's study concludes that individuals who score high on the agreeableness trait will likely learn just to perform well in front of others.

Besides openness, all Big Five personality traits helped predict the educational identity of students. Based on these findings, scientists are beginning to see that the Big Five traits might have a large influence on academic motivation that leads to predicting a student's academic performance. A study found that primary students were more associated with openness to experiences and that students would achieve greater academic success after exploring them. On the secondary level, achievement was more related to the conscientiousness dimension, where grade point averages (GPA) dictated their level. These findings further supported that conscientiousness personality traits perform at secondary and tertiary levels and have an effect on personality constructs. Other researchers found conscientiousness to be the most influential personality dimension on students' academic performances, followed by openness. Data revealed that the openness domain can predict academic achievement just as significantly as conscientiousness.

Some authors suggested that Big Five personality traits combined with learning styles can help predict some variations in the academic performance and the academic motivation of an individual which can then influence their academic achievements. This may be seen because individual differences in personality represent stable approaches to information processing. For instance, conscientiousness has consistently emerged as a stable predictor of success in exam performance, largely because conscientious students experience fewer study delays. Conscientiousness shows a positive association with the four learning styles because students with high levels of conscientiousness develop focused learning strategies and appear to be more disciplined and achievement-oriented.

Personality and learning styles are both likely to play significant roles in influencing academic achievement. College students (308 undergraduates) completed the Five Factor Inventory and the Inventory of Learning Processes and reported their grade point average. Two of the Big Five traits, conscientiousness and agreeableness, were positively related with all four learning styles (synthesis analysis, methodical study, fact retention, and elaborative processing), whereas neuroticism was negatively related with all four learning styles. In addition, extraversion and openness were positively related with elaborative processing. The Big Five together explained 14% of the variance in grade point average (GPA), and learning styles explained an additional 3%, suggesting that both personality traits and learning styles contribute to academic performance. Further, the relationship between openness and GPA was mediated by reflective learning styles (synthesis-analysis and elaborative processing). These latter results suggest that being intellectually curious fully enhances academic performance when students combine this scholarly interest with thoughtful information processing. Implications of these results are discussed in the context of teaching techniques and curriculum design.

— M Komarraju

==== Distance learning ====
When the relationship between the five-factor personality traits and academic achievement in distance education settings was examined in brief, the openness personality trait was found to be the most important variable that has a positive relationship with academic achievement in distance education environments. In addition, it was found that self-discipline, extraversion, and adaptability personality traits are generally in a positive relationship with academic achievement. The most important personality trait that has a negative relationship with academic achievement has emerged as neuroticism. The results generally show that individuals who are organized, planned, determined, who are oriented to new ideas and independent thinking have increased success in distance education environments. On the other hand, it can be said that individuals with anxiety and stress tendencies generally have lower academic success.

==== Occupation and personality fit ====
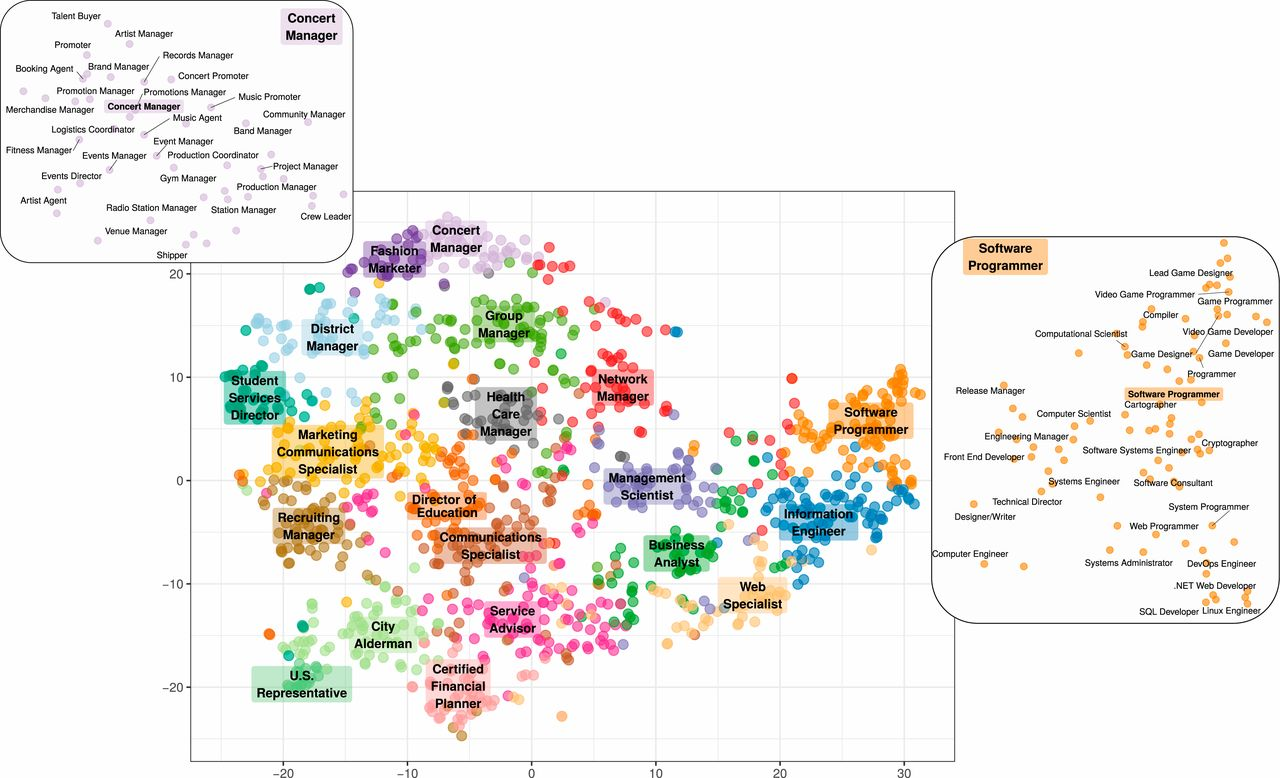
The Vocations Map - clustering of the social media presence of users in different professions

Researchers have long suggested that work is more likely to be fulfilling to the individual and beneficial to society when there is alignment between the person and their occupation. For instance, software programmers and scientists often rank high on Openness to experience and tend to be intellectually curious, think in symbols and abstractions, and find repetition boring. Psychologists and sociologists rank higher on Agreeableness and Openness than economists and jurists. A study designed to determine the impact of Big Five personality traits on prospective teachers' academic achievements and to differentiate the Big Five personality traits on demographic variables found that academic achievement can be predicted by conscientiousness. Researchers concluded that conscientiousness and openness to experience were the most significant changes in academic achievement of prospective teachers and were able to predict 20% of the variance in prospective teachers. The independent t-test showed a significant difference in neuroticism by gender, with females having a standard deviation of 4.14 and males scoring a standard deviation of 3.76. These results revealed that females typically have a more neurotic personality in comparison to males, yet there was no significant difference in openness to experience, agreeableness, conscientiousness, or extraversion based on gender.

==== Work success ====
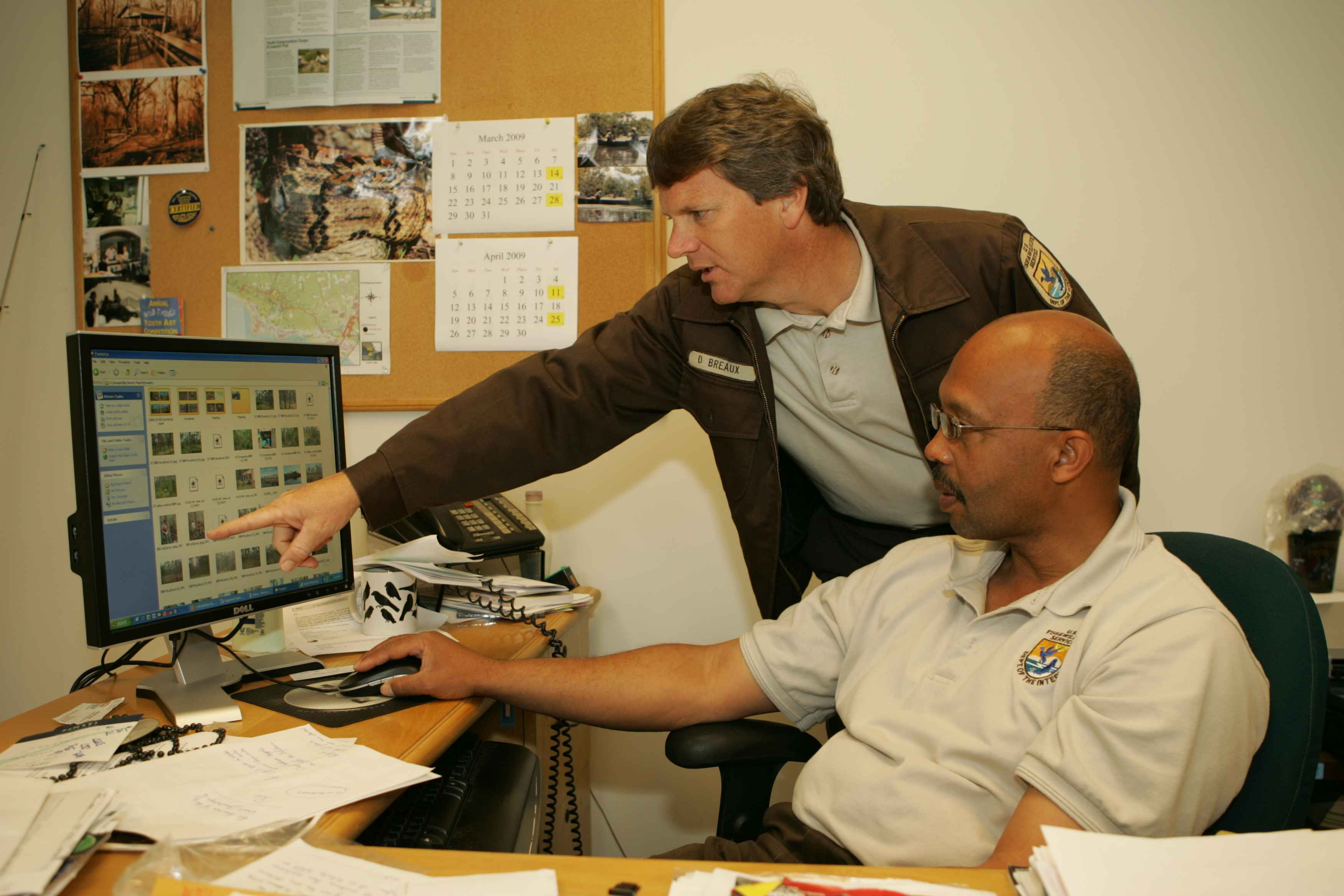
The relationship between Big Five traits and workplace success remains somewhat controversial.

Research has demonstrated that the big five personality traits correlate with important work outcomes such as job performance, training proficiency, and turnover. For example, an early meta-analysis found an estimated population correlation of 0.26 between conscientiousness and supervisory ratings of job performance. These results are consistent with research suggesting that personality traits predict a broad range of important life outcomes.

However, these criteria-related validity results have been criticized, in part because of the apparently weak correlations: "The problem with personality tests is ... that the validity of personality measures as predictors of job performance is often disappointingly low. The argument for using personality tests to predict performance does not strike me as convincing in the first place."

Subsequent literature has suggested that correlations obtained by psychometric personality researchers were actually very respectable by comparative standards, and that the economic value of even incremental increases in prediction accuracy was exceptionally large, given the vast difference in performance by those who occupy complex job positions.

One way to explain this controversy is that there is little doubt that personality predicts a broad array of important outcomes but it is also clear that other selection methods have higher validity as compared to personality.

Research has suggested that individuals who are considered leaders typically exhibit lower amounts of neurotic traits, maintain higher levels of openness, balanced levels of conscientiousness, and balanced levels of extraversion. Bono and Judge (2004) discovered extraversion, openness, and conscientiousness all predicted leadership potential; in addition, they also uncovered extraversion in transformative leadership, which in turn reduced conscientiousness. The effectiveness of leadership is positively influenced by factors like managerial experience, conscientiousness, and intelligence. Further studies have linked professional burnout to neuroticism, and extraversion to enduring positive work experience. Studies have linked national innovation, leadership, and ideation to openness to experience and conscientiousness. Occupational self-efficacy has also been shown to be positively correlated with conscientiousness and negatively correlated with neuroticism. Some research has also suggested that the conscientiousness of a supervisor is positively associated with an employee's perception of abusive supervision. Others have suggested that low agreeableness and high neuroticism are traits more related to abusive supervision.

Openness is positively related to proactivity at the individual and the organizational levels and is negatively related to team and organizational proficiency. These effects were found to be completely independent of one another. This is also counter-conscientious and has a negative correlation to Conscientiousness.

Agreeableness is negatively related to individual task proactivity. Typically this is associated with lower career success and being less able to cope with conflict. However, there are benefits to the Agreeableness personality trait including higher subjective well-being; more positive interpersonal interactions and helping behavior; lower conflict; lower deviance and turnover. Furthermore, attributes related to Agreeableness are important for workforce readiness for a variety of occupations and performance criteria. Research has suggested that those who are high in agreeableness are not as successful in accumulating income.

Extraversion results in greater leadership emergence and effectiveness; as well as higher job and life satisfaction. However extraversion can lead to more impulsive behaviors, more accidents and lower performance in certain jobs.

Conscientiousness is highly predictive of job performance in general, and is positively related to all forms of work role performance, including job performance and job satisfaction, greater leadership effectiveness, lower turnover and deviant behaviors. However this personality trait is associated with reduced adaptability, lower learning in initial stages of skill acquisition and more interpersonally abrasiveness, when also low in agreeableness. It is also not the case that more or extreme conscientiousness is always necessarily better as there does appear to be a link between conscientiousness and obsessive-compulsive personality disorder (OCPD). Selecting employees for a moderate level of conscientiousness may actually provide the best occupational outcome.

Neuroticism is negatively related to all forms of work role performance. This increases the chance of engaging in risky behaviors.

Two theories have been integrated in an attempt to account for these differences in work role performance. Trait activation theory posits that within a person trait levels predict future behavior, that trait levels differ between people, and that work-related cues activate traits which leads to work relevant behaviors. Role theory suggests that role senders provide cues to elicit desired behaviors. In this context, role senders provide workers with cues for expected behaviors, which in turn activates personality traits and work relevant behaviors. In essence, expectations of the role sender lead to different behavioral outcomes depending on the trait levels of individual workers, and because people differ in trait levels, responses to these cues will not be universal.

==== Remote work/telework ====
As of 2020, remote work has become more and more prevalent as brought on by the COVID-19 pandemic. However, research has shown that the Big Five personality traits still influence remote work. Gavoille and Hazans have found that conscientiousness (β=0.06) and openness to experience are both positively correlated with willingness to work and worker productivity within a remote setting, with openness to experience being less significant (β=0.021). This is then contrasted with extraversion (β=-0.038), which negatively correlates with Willingness to work and openness. Another conclusion that was found is that gender did not play a role in the difference between conscientiousness and extraversion, and willingness to work from home. Similarly, Wright investigated the influence of Big Five on the soft skills in the remote workplace, such as effort and cooperation. She delineated soft skills into two different groups, Task Performance and Contextual Performance, with each having three subgroups. Task Performance was more aligned with specific job responsibilities and handling cognitive tasks associated with their job, and the three subgroups were Job Knowledge, Organizational Skills, and Efficiency. Wright found that Job Knowledge did not correlate with any Big Five traits, Organizational Skill is only significantly correlated with Conscientiousness (T=7.952, P=.001), and Efficiency is significantly correlated with Conscientiousness (T=3.8, P=.001), and Neuroticism(T=-2.6, P=.008), which it is a negative correlation. Contextual Performance is concerned with non-job core requirements, such as perceived effort and job cooperation, with the subgroups being Persistent Effort, Cooperation, and Organizational Conscientiousness. Wright found that Persistent Effort is positively correlated with Openness(t=2.4, P=.014) and Conscientiousness (T=3.1, P=.002), and negatively correlated with Neuroticism (T=-3.2, P=.001). Cooperation was positively correlated with Extraversion (t=2.6, P=.009) and Conscientiousness (t=2.82, P=.005), as well as Organizational Conscientiousness was positively correlated with Agreeableness (t=4.059, P<.001) and Conscientiousness (t=4.511, P<.001)

On another tack, scientists wanted to discover if the Big Five has any effect on remote worker burnout, and the effect that different Big Five traits have on worker health and engagement. Olsen et al. found that when remote work days are increased, individuals high in extraversion start to struggle with work engagement (β=-.094, P<.03), and individuals with higher neuroticism are more likely to have poorer health (p=-.23), work engagement (p=-.18), and an increase in sick leaves(p=.38). However, Olsen found that conscientiousness, coupled with an increase in remote work days, can lead to a decrease in general health, contrary to all of the benefits it has listed above. Similarly, Para et al. found that individuals with higher Neuroticism (β=.138, p<.05) also tend to have higher Remote Work Exhaustion (RWE). They also found that conscientiousness(β=-.336, p<.001) and agreeableness (β=-.267, p<.001) were negatively correlated with RWE, meaning that they were more resilient against RWE over large spans of remote work days. The author attributed conscientious individuals to being hard workers and dependable, while agreeableness was attributed to the situation the study was completed under, which was the at-home quarantine due to COVID-19, stating individuals with high agreeableness did well with the forced contact due to quarantine, which transferred over to their work.

=== Cross-cultural and international research ===
Research into the Big Five has been pursued in a variety of languages and cultures, such as German, Chinese, and South Asian. For example, Thompson has claimed to find the Big Five structure across several cultures using an international English language scale. Studies of the Revised NEO Personality Inventory, which has been translated into more than forty languages and dialects, have found an approximation to the five-factor structure in more than thirty cultures examined. These findings do not rule out additional personality traits specific to individual cultures, and the factors may not be equally important in every culture. For example, Openness to Experience might be less important in traditional cultures. Individual differences in personality traits are widely understood to be conditioned by cultural context. Measures of the Big Five constructs appear to show some consistency in interviews, self-descriptions and observations, and this static five-factor structure seems to be found across a wide range of participants of different ages and cultures. However, while genotypic temperament trait dimensions might appear across different cultures, the phenotypic expression of personality traits differs profoundly across different cultures as a function of the different socio-cultural conditioning and experiential learning that takes place within different cultural settings. Surveys in studies are often online surveys of college students (compare WEIRD bias). Results do not always replicate when run on other populations or in other languages. Different surveys do not always measure the same 5 factors.

Sopagna Eap et al. (2008) found that European-American men scored higher than Asian-American men on extroversion, conscientiousness, and openness, while Asian-American men scored higher than European-American men on neuroticism. Benet-Martínez and Karakitapoglu-Aygün (2003) arrived at similar results.

Recent work has found relationships between Geert Hofstede's cultural factors, Individualism, Power Distance, Masculinity, and Uncertainty Avoidance, with the average Big Five scores in a country. For instance, the degree to which a country values individualism correlates with its average extraversion, whereas people living in cultures which are accepting of large inequalities in their power structures tend to score somewhat higher on conscientiousness.

A 2017 study has found that countries' average personality trait levels are correlated with their political systems. Countries with higher average trait Openness tended to have more democratic institutions, an association that held even after factoring out other relevant influences such as economic development.

One limitation highlighted by cross-cultural research is that studies supporting the universality of the Five-Factor Model are often from 2002 or older, which can influence current results. Methodological concerns may also arise from the reliance on Western-Developed instruments in some cross-cultural studies, affecting the validity of findings in diverse cultural contexts.

=== Political identification, religiosity, and language ===
The Big Five Personality Model also has applications in the study of political psychology. Studies have been finding links between the big five personality traits and political identification. It has been found by several studies in the West that individuals who score high in Conscientiousness are more likely to possess a right-wing political identification. On the opposite end of the spectrum, a strong correlation was identified between high scores in Openness to Experience and a left-leaning ideology. While the traits of agreeableness, extraversion, and neuroticism have not been consistently linked to either conservative or liberal ideology, with studies producing mixed results, such traits are promising when analyzing the strength of an individual's party identification. However, correlations between the Big Five and political beliefs, while present, tend to be small, with one study finding correlations ranged from 0.14 to 0.24.

Though the effect sizes are small: Of the Big Five personality traits high Agreeableness, Conscientiousness and Extraversion relate to general religiosity, while Openness relate negatively to religious fundamentalism and positively to spirituality. High Neuroticism may be related to extrinsic religiosity, whereas intrinsic religiosity and spirituality reflect Emotional Stability.

Andrew H. Schwartz analyzed 700 million words, phrases, and topic instances collected from the Facebook messages of 75,000 volunteers, who also took standard personality tests, and found striking variations in language with personality, gender, and age.

==== China ====
A 2021 analysis by Princeton University academic Rory Truex of survey results showed that in China, high neuroticism and low conscientiousness, agreeableness and openness to experience correlated with discontent with the Chinese Communist Party (CCP), while CCP members on average had very high levels of extraversion, agreeableness, and conscientiousness.

==== Russia ====
According to a 2017 research, higher agreeableness and conscientiousness and lower neuroticism in Russia is correlated with higher support for President Vladimir Putin, while lower agreeableness and conscientiousness and higher neuroticism is correlated with discontent with him; the study did not find major differences in openness to experience and extraversion.

=== Lifespan development ===
==== Temperament and personality in children ====
Some consider the big five model as inappropriate for studying early childhood, as language is not yet developed. There are debates between temperament researchers and personality researchers as to whether or not biologically based differences define a concept of temperament or a part of personality. The presence of such differences in pre-cultural individuals (such as animals or young infants) suggests that they belong to temperament since personality is a socio-cultural concept. For this reason developmental psychologists generally interpret individual differences in children as an expression of temperament rather than personality. Some researchers argue that temperaments and personality traits are age-specific demonstrations of virtually the same internal qualities. Some believe that early childhood temperaments may become adolescent and adult personality traits as individuals' basic genetic characteristics interact with their changing environments to various degrees.

Researchers of adult temperament point out that, similarly to sex, age, and mental illness, temperament is based on biochemical systems whereas personality is a product of socialisation of an individual possessing these four types of features. Temperament interacts with socio-cultural factors, but, similar to sex and age, still cannot be controlled or easily changed by these factors. Therefore, it is suggested that temperament (neurochemically based individual differences) should be kept as an independent concept for further studies and not be confused with personality (culturally based individual differences, reflected in the origin of the word "persona" (Lat) as a "social mask").

Moreover, temperament refers to dynamic features of behaviour (energetic, tempo, sensitivity, and emotionality-related), whereas personality is to be considered a psycho-social construct comprising the content characteristics of human behaviour (such as values, attitudes, habits, preferences, personal history, self-image). Temperament researchers point out that the lack of attention to surviving temperament research by the creators of the Big Five model led to an overlap between its dimensions and dimensions described in multiple temperament models much earlier. For example, neuroticism reflects the traditional temperament dimension of emotionality studied by Jerome Kagan's group since the 1960s. Extraversion was first introduced by Jung in the 1920s.

==== Child extraversion/positive emotionality ====
In Big Five studies, extraversion has been associated with surgency. Children with high Extraversion are energetic, talkative, social, and dominant with children and adults, whereas children with low extraversion tend to be quiet, calm, inhibited, and submissive to other children and adults. Individual differences in extraversion first manifest in infancy as varying levels of positive emotionality. These differences in turn predict social and physical activity during later childhood and may represent, or be associated with, the behavioral activation system. In children, Extraversion/Positive Emotionality includes four sub-traits: three of these (activity, sociability, and shyness) are similar to the previously described traits of temperament; the other is dominance.

- Activity: Similarly to findings in temperament research, children with high activity tend to have high energy levels and more intense and frequent motor activity compared to their peers. Salient differences in activity reliably manifest in infancy, persist through adolescence, and fade as motor activity decreases in adulthood or potentially develops into talkativeness.
- Dominance: Children with high dominance tend to influence the behavior of others, particularly their peers, to obtain desirable rewards or outcomes. Such children are generally skilled at organizing activities and games and deceiving others by controlling their nonverbal behavior.
- Shyness: Children with high shyness are generally socially withdrawn, nervous, and inhibited around strangers. In time, such children may become fearful even around "known others", especially if their peers reject them. Similar pattern was described in temperament longitudinal studies of shyness
- Sociability: Children with high sociability generally prefer to be with others rather than alone. During middle childhood, the distinction between low sociability and high shyness becomes more pronounced, particularly as children gain greater control over how and where they spend their time.

==== Development during childhood and adolescence ====
Research on the Big Five, and personality in general, has focused primarily on individual differences in adulthood, rather than in childhood and adolescence, and often include temperament traits. Recently, there has been growing recognition of the need to study child and adolescent personality trait development in order to understand how traits develop and change throughout the lifespan.

Recent studies have begun to explore the developmental origins and trajectories of the Big Five among children and adolescents, especially those that relate to temperament. Many researchers have sought to distinguish between personality and temperament. Temperament often refers to early behavioral and affective characteristics that are thought to be driven primarily by genes. Models of temperament often include four trait dimensions: surgency/sociability, negative emotionality, persistence/effortful control, and activity level. Some of these differences in temperament are evident at, if not before, birth. For example, both parents and researchers recognize that some newborn infants are peaceful and easily soothed while others are comparatively fussy and hard to calm. Unlike temperament, however, many researchers view the development of personality as gradually occurring throughout childhood. Contrary to some researchers who question whether children have stable personality traits, Big Five or otherwise, most researchers contend that there are significant psychological differences between children that are associated with relatively stable, distinct, and salient behavior patterns.

Findings from studies indicate that, consistent with adult personality trends, youth personality becomes increasingly more stable in terms of rank-order throughout childhood. Unlike adult personality research, which indicates that people become agreeable, conscientious, and emotionally stable with age, some findings in youth personality research have indicated that mean levels of agreeableness, conscientiousness, and openness to experience decline from late childhood to late adolescence. The disruption hypothesis, which proposes that biological, social, and psychological changes experienced during youth result in temporary dips in maturity, has been proposed to explain these findings.

==== Aging ====
Many studies of longitudinal data, which correlate people's test scores over time, and cross-sectional data, which compare personality levels across different age groups, show a high degree of stability in personality traits during adulthood, especially Neuroticism that is often regarded as a temperament trait similarly to longitudinal research in temperament for the same traits. It is shown that the personality stabilizes for working-age individuals within about four years after starting working. There is also little evidence that adverse life events can have any significant impact on the personality of individuals. More recent research and meta-analyses of previous studies, however, indicate that change occurs in all five traits at various points in the lifespan. The new research shows evidence for a maturation effect. On average, levels of agreeableness and conscientiousness typically increase with time, whereas extraversion, neuroticism, and openness tend to decrease. Research has also demonstrated that changes in Big Five personality traits depend on the individual's current stage of development. For example, levels of agreeableness and conscientiousness demonstrate a negative trend during childhood and early adolescence before trending upwards during late adolescence and into adulthood. In addition to these group effects, there are individual differences: different people demonstrate unique patterns of change at all stages of life.

Previous research has found evidence that most adults become more agreeable and conscientious and less neurotic as they age. This has been referred to as the maturation effect. Many researchers have sought to investigate how trends in adult personality development compare to trends in youth personality development. Two main population-level indices have been important in this area of research: rank-order consistency and mean-level consistency. Rank-order consistency indicates the relative placement of individuals within a group. Mean-level consistency indicates whether groups increase or decrease on certain traits throughout the lifetime.

Research regarding personality with growing age has suggested that as individuals enter their elder years (79–86), those with lower IQ see a raise in extraversion, but a decline in conscientiousness and physical well-being.

=== Well-being ===
==== Physical health ====
To examine how the Big Five personality traits are related to subjective health outcomes (positive and negative mood, physical symptoms, and general health concern) and objective health conditions (chronic illness, serious illness, and physical injuries), Jasna Hudek-Knezevic and Igor Kardum conducted a study from a sample of 822 healthy volunteers (438 women and 384 men). Out of the Big Five personality traits, they found neuroticism most related to worse subjective health outcomes and optimistic control to better subjective health outcomes. When relating to objective health conditions, connections drawn were presented weak, except that neuroticism significantly predicted chronic illness, whereas optimistic control was more closely related to physical injuries caused by accident.

Being highly conscientious may add as much as five years to one's life. The Big Five personality traits also predict positive health outcomes. In an elderly Japanese sample, conscientiousness, extraversion, and openness were related to lower risk of mortality.

Higher conscientiousness is associated with lower obesity risk. In already obese individuals, higher conscientiousness is associated with a higher likelihood of becoming non-obese over a five-year period.

==== Hope ====
Studies conducted on college students have concluded that hope, which is linked to agreeableness, conscientiousness, neuroticism, and openness, has a positive effect on psychological well-being. Individuals high in neurotic tendencies are less likely to display hopeful tendencies and are negatively associated with well-being.

==== Romantic relationships ====
Various researchers have explored the association of Big Five and romantic relationships in terms of relationship satisfaction. A meta-analysis showed that there was a higher level of marital satisfaction if their spouse showed lower levels in neuroticism (.22), but higher levels in agreeableness (.15) and conscientiousness(.12). There was only a weak correlation, but it was the same level of satisfaction for both genders. Much like the previous meta-analysis, a study on self-reported big five traits showed that those with higher levels of agreeableness, emotional stability, conscientiousness, and extraversion had higher levels of marital satisfaction(.20). That same study found that there was little to no difference in marital satisfaction if the two partners had similar or different levels of trait personality.

O'Brien and colleagues examined the association of Big Five and romantic relationships by investigating participants' commitment levels. The three levels of commitment are affective commitment (emotional attachment), continuance commitment (financial considerations), and normative commitment (the ethical and moral responsibilities). The commitment levels were based on the taxonomy of organizational commitment and the conceptual model of marital commitment of Johnson and Johnson et al. 122 Individuals currently in a committed relationship responded to a 50-item personality questionnaire from the International Personality Item Pool (IPIP, 2006), and a questionnaire on commitment modified from Allen. The key findings showed that participants high in Extraversion reported high levels of affective commitment; participants high on Extraversion were higher on Openness to Experience and affective commitment. Conscientiousness demonstrated a negative relationship with continuance commitment. While Extraversion and Agreeableness exhibited a positive correlation with each other, no significant relationships were found between Agreeableness and any of the commitment measures. The findings indicated gender differences in that women with lower levels of Openness to Experience were often paired with partners who scored higher in Extraversion. Men who exhibited strong affective commitment were more likely to be in relationships with women high in Conscientiousness. Additionally, women whose partners showed high affective commitment tended to be higher in both Conscientiousness and Emotional Stability.

Asselmann and Sprecht examined the association of Big Five (BFI-S) and romantic relationships through major life events across years in 2005, 2009, 2013, and 2017 with a sample of 49,932 participants in Germany. Those major life events are (1) moving in with a partner, (2) getting married, (3) getting separated, and (4) getting divorced. Researchers also examined whether the Big Five personality traits play a significant role in romantic relationships. Along the spectrum of a person's life satisfaction, marital satisfaction (one of romantic relationships) is shown to be stronger than job satisfaction, health satisfaction, and social satisfaction. The key findings from Asselmann and Sprecht showed that more extraverted individuals were more likely to move in with a partner. Less agreeable and less emotionally stable women were more likely to move in with a partner. Men were more extraverted in the years before moving in and became gradually more open and more conscientious after moving in. Less agreeable men were more likely to get married. Individuals who got married became less open in the first three years after the marriage. Women became more extraverted after being separated. Men with lower emotional stability and women who were both less emotionally stable and more extraverted were more prone to experiencing relationship breakups. Individuals who got divorced were less agreeable in the years before the divorce. Personality may change after specific events. For example, both men and women who experienced separation or divorce became less emotionally stable in the following years. The results implicated that total agreeableness was not a guarantee for long-lasting romantic relationships, as less agreeable individuals were more likely to experience both positive and negative major romantic events. Getting into a long-term romantic relationship can kick-start personality development in young adults ages 20–30 as they are faced with new social situations and expectations. For instance, high levels of trait neuroticism at the beginning of relationships can be seen decreasing over 8 years once the relationship has begun, as well as other Big Five personality traits, such as Conscientiousness and Agreeableness, can be seen increasing in long-term relationships.

== Critique ==
The Big Five model has been subjected to considerable critical scrutiny in a number of published studies. (Note: Attributed to multiple sources:) One prominent critic of the model has been Jack Block at the University of California, Berkeley. In response to Block, the model was defended in a paper published by Costa and McCrae. This was followed by a number of published critical replies from Block.

The main criticism of the Big Five traits is that they do not explain enough of human personality. Some psychologists feel it neglects other domains of personality, such as religiosity, manipulativeness/machiavellianism, honesty, sexiness/seductiveness, thrift, conservatism, masculinity/femininity, snobbishness, egotism, sense of humour, and risk-taking/thrill-seeking. Dan P. McAdams has called the Big Five a "psychology of the stranger", because they refer to traits that are relatively easy to observe in a stranger; other aspects of personality that are more privately held or more context-dependent are excluded from the Big Five. Block has pointed to several less-recognized but successful efforts to specify aspects of character not subsumed by the model. It has been argued the Big Five may account for as little as 56% of the normal personality trait sphere. Studies indicate that the Big Five traits are not as powerful in predicting and explaining actual behaviour as the more fine-grained facets or primary traits.

In his 1968 book Personality and Assessment, Walter Mischel asserted that personality instruments could not predict behavior with a correlation of more than 0.3. Social psychologists like Mischel argued that attitudes and behavior were not stable, but varied with the situation. Scientists such as Mischel claimed predicting behavior from personality instruments was impossible. However, during the 1980s, emerging methodologies increasingly confirmed personality theories. Though generally failing to predict single instances of behavior, researchers found that they could predict patterns of behavior by aggregating large numbers of observations. As a result, correlations between personality and behavior increased substantially, and it became clear that "personality" did in fact exist.

The Big Five is not theory-driven but a statistical investigation of certain descriptors that tend to cluster.

Most measures of the FFM do not assess all of its maladaptive variants and therefore will not account for all of the components of a given personality disorder. Measures to assess maladaptive FFM traits have been developed, including the Five Factor Model Personality Disorder scales, the Personality Inventory for ICD‐11, and the Personality Inventory for DSM‐5. The model has been replicated in several languages, and the ICD and DSM models for personality disorders are shifting toward the FFM. The five-factor model was among the first personality models in psychology derived from empirical research into natural-language data which found consistent correlations between the adjectives people use to describe themselves.

Today, the five-factor model underlies most contemporary personality research, and the model has been described as one of the major breakthroughs of quantitative behavioural science. The five-factor structure has been confirmed by many subsequent studies across cultures and languages, which have replicated the original model and reported largely similar factors.

== See also ==
- Core self-evaluations
- Biological basis of personality
- Dark triad
- DISC assessment
- Facet
- Genomics of personality traits
- Goal orientation
- Moral foundations theory
- Personality psychology
- Trait theory
