= Facet (psychology) =

Specific and unique aspect of a broader personality trait

In psychology, a facet is a specific and unique aspect of a broader personality trait. Both the concept and the term "facet" were introduced by Paul Costa and Robert McCrae in the first edition of the NEO-Personality Inventory (NEO-PI) Manual. Facets were originally elaborated only for the neuroticism, openness to experience, and extraversion traits; Costa and McCrae introduced facet scales for the agreeableness and conscientiousness traits in the Revised NEO-PI (NEO PI-R). Each of the Big Five personality traits in the five factor model contains six facets, each of which is measured with a separate scale. The use of facets and facet scales has since expanded beyond the NEO PI-R, with alternative facet and domain structures derived from other models of personality. Examples include the HEXACO model of personality structure, psycholexical studies (such as that of Gerard Saucier and Fritz Ostendorf), circumplex models (e.g. Goldberg's Abridged Big-Five Dimensional Circumplex), the Multidimensional Personality Questionnaire (MPQ), and the California Psychological Inventory.

== Five factor model ==
=== NEO PI-R ===
Costa and McCrae originally developed facet scales for neuroticism, extraversion, and openness to experience to reflect the fact that each broader trait is composed of different aspects of personality. They admit their decisions were somewhat arbitrary and acknowledge that each trait may actually have more or less than six facets. However, they justify their choices with the need for a balance between comprehension and comprehensiveness and research supporting their six facet breakdown of each Big Five personality trait. The following table displays the labels used by Costa and McCrae for each personality domain and its constituent facets.

- Neuroticism: Anxiety, hostility, depression, self-consciousness, impulsiveness, vulnerability
- Extroversion: Warmth, gregariousness, assertiveness, activity, excitement-seeking, positive emotions
- Openness to experience: fantasy, aesthetics, feelings, actions, ideas, values
- Agreeableness: Trust, straightforwardness, altruism, compliance, modesty, tender-mindedness
- Conscientiousness: Competence, order, dutifulness, achievement striving, self-discipline, deliberation

=== Saucier and Ostendorf ===
In contrast with Costa and McCrae's admittedly arbitrary decisions, studies guided by the Lexical hypothesis root facets in the personality language of laypeople. This approach is meant to test, and possibly enhance, the content validity of the measures used. Using the five factor model, Gerard Saucier and Fritz Ostendorf explored each domain's facet structure through lexical studies. Using English and German participants and materials, they found a total of 18 facets, or "subcomponents", of the Big Five. These are:

- Neuroticism: Irritability, insecurity, emotionality
- Extroversion: Sociability, unrestraint, assertiveness, activity-adventurousness
- Openness to Experience: Intellect, imagination-creativity, perceptiveness
- Agreeableness: Warmth-affection, gentleness, generosity, modesty-humility
- Conscientiousness: Orderliness, decisiveness-consistency, reliability, industriousness

=== Abridged Big-Five Dimensional Circumplex ===
The standard five factor model conceives of personality as a collection of unidimensional, polar scales. In contrast, circumplex models explore personality as it is constructed in the two-dimensional space created by the intersections of these polar scales. Timothy Leary was the first to apply the circumplex to the study of personality. Following Leary's pioneering work in the 1950s, Jerry Wiggins' Interpersonal Circle was one of the most influential early circumplex models of personality. Despite similarities between the Interpersonal Circle and two of the Big Five, it was only later that the work of Lewis Goldberg with Dean Peabody, and Willem Hofstee and Boele de Raad integrated the circumplex and Five Factor models. The result was The Abridged Big-Five Dimensional Circumplex (AB5C). In place of specific facet labels, Goldberg and his colleagues use Roman numerals, and plus and minus signs corresponding to the two intersecting factors. For example, the facet corresponding to the intersection of extraversion and disagreeableness is represented by "I+II−".

The following tables list adjectives associated with the intersections of high scores (+) and low scores (−) on the Five Factors. Corresponding NEO PI-R labels are provided in parentheses, with adjectives approximating pure Big Five traits (e.g., extraversion, neuroticism) in bold. Empty cells represent impossible combinations (e.g., I+I−) or "blank spaces" (e.g., II+III−) – that is, combinations that are either unimportant or do not naturally appear in language.

Intersections of two positives (++)
	Extraversion (I+)	Agreeableness (II+)	Conscientiousness (III+)	Emotional Stability (IV+)	Openness to Experience (V+)
Extraversion (I+)	**Talkative, Extraverted, Aggressive**	Sociable, Enthusiastic, Communicative	Active, Competitive, Persistent	Confident, Bold, Assured	Expressive, Adventurous, Dramatic
Agreeableness (II+)	Sympathetic, Kind, Warm	**Merry, Cheerful, Happy**	Helpful, Cooperative, Considerate	Trustful, Pleasant, Tolerant	Genial, Tactful
Conscientiousness (III+)	Alert, Ambitious, Firm	Responsible, Dependable, Reliable	**Organized, Neat, Orderly**	Thorough, Steady, Consistent	Industrious, Perfectionistic, Sophisticated
Emotional Stability (IV+)	Unselfconscious, Weariless, Indefatigable	Patient, Relaxed, Undemanding	Determined, Unswerving	**Unenvious**	Adaptable, Multitalented
Openness to Experience (V+)	Theatrical, Worldly, Eloquent	Deep, Diplomatic, Idealistic	Analytical, Perceptive, Informative	Intellectual, Inventive, Intelligent	**Creative, Philosophical, Imaginative**
Note: Adjectives provided above load more closely on their row's Factor. For example, "Sociable" is nearer to Extraversion than Agreeableness, while "Sympathetic" is nearer to Agreeableness than Extraversion.

Intersections of positive and negative, with weight on positive (+-)
	Introversion (I−)	Disagreeableness (II−)	Low Conscientiousness (III−)	Neuroticism (IV−)	Closed to Experience (V−)
Extraversion (I+)		Dominant, Domineering, Forceful	Boisterous, Mischievous, Exhibitionistic	Flirtatious, Explosive, Wordy	Verbose
Agreeableness (II+)	Soft-hearted, Agreeable, Obliging		Lenient, Compassionate, Sheeple	Sentimental, Affectionate, Sensitive	Conforming
Conscientiousness (III+)	Careful, Cautious, Punctual	Demanding, Strict, Deliberate		Exacting, Arduous	Conventional, Traditional
Emotional Stability (IV+)	Unexcitable, Unassuming	Unemotional, Masculine	Informal, Casual		Imperturbable, Unconcerned
Openness to Experience (V+)	Introspective, Meditative, Contemplating	Individualistic, Eccentric	Improvisational, Versatile	Sensual	
Note: Adjectives provided above load more closely on their row's Factor. For example, "Dominant" is nearer to Extraversion than Disagreeableness.

Intersections of positive and negative, with weight on negative (-+)
	Extraversion (I+)	Agreeableness (II+)	Conscientiousness (III+)	Emotional Stability (IV+)	Openness to Experience (V+)
Introversion (I−)		Timid, Unaggressive, Submissive	Reserved, Restrained, Serious	Tranquil, Sedate, Placid	Inner-Directed
Disagreeableness (II−)	Rough, Abrupt, Crude		Rigid, Hard	Insensitive, Unaffectionate, Passionless	Shrewd, Sharp-Witted
Low Conscientiousness (III−)	Reckless, Unruly, Devil-May-Care	Permissive, Enabling		Complacent, Unbothered	Unconventional, Slapdash
Neuroticism (IV−)	High-Strung	Emotional, Gullible	Particular, Intrusive		Paranoid, Histrionic, Weird
Closed to Experience (V−)	Unscrupulous, Pompous	Simple, Dependent, Servile	Muleheaded, Obstinate, Infuriating	Unreflective, Unsophisticated, Imperceptive	
Note: Adjectives provided above load more closely on their row's Factor. For example, "Rough" is nearer to Disagreeableness than Extraversion.

Intersection of negatives (--)
	Introversion (I−)	Disagreeableness (II−)	Low Conscientiousness (III−)	Neuroticism (IV−)	Closed to Experience (V−)
Introversion (I−)	**Shy, Quiet, Introverted**	Unsociable, Uncommunicative, Seclusive	Unenergetic, Uncompetitive, Sluggish	Lonely, Weak	Passive, Meek, Dull
Disagreeableness (II−)	Cold, Unfriendly, Impersonal	**Unsympathetic, Unkind, Harsh**	Inconsiderate, Rude, Impolite	Entitled, Selfish, Ill-Tempered	Uncharitable, Ruthless, Coarse
Low Conscientiousness (III−)	Inefficient, Lazy, Indecisive	Unreliable, Negligent, Irresponsible	**Disorganized, Disorderly, Careless**	Inconsistent, Scatterbrained, Unstable	Haphazard, Illogical, Immature
Neuroticism (IV−)	Self-Pitying, Insecure, Fretful	Irritable, Temperamental	Compulsive, Nosey	**Moody, Jealous, Possessive**	Cowardly
Closed to Experience (V−)	Unimaginative, Uninquisitive, Inarticulate	Dogmatic, Infallible, Mean	Shortsighted, Unobservant, Ignorant	Controlling	**Uncreative, Unintellectual, Unintelligent**
Note: Adjectives provided above load more closely on their row's Factor. For example, "Inefficient" is nearer to Low Conscientiousness than Intoversion, while "Unenergetic" is nearer to Introversion than Low Conscientiousness.

== Other models ==
=== Multidimensional Personality Questionnaire ===
The Multidimensional Personality Questionnaire (MPQ) was developed by Auke Tellegen at the University of Minnesota in the early 1980s. It has been used since its development in the Minnesota Twin Family Study. Three of the four broad traits measured by the MPQ contain between three and four facets, or "primary traits". The fourth, "absorption", is classified as both a broad trait and a primary trait. In addition to these personality measures, the MPQ contains three scales assessing the validity of responses. The "Unlikely Virtues" scale is designed to assess impression management, the "True Response Inconsistency" scale assesses the tendency to answer all questions true (or false), and the "Variable Response Inconsistency" scale assesses inconsistent responses to similar or opposite questions. The following table displays Tellegen's labels for broad traits, primary traits (facets), and the subscales of absorption.

- Positive emotional temperament: Well-being, social potency, achievement, social closeness
- Negative emotional temperament: Stress reaction, alienation, aggression
- Constraint: Control, harm-avoidance, traditionalism
- Absorption (subscales): Sentient, prone to imaginative and altered states

=== HEXACO model ===
The HEXACO model is a six-factor model of personality. This model was developed in the early 2000s by Michael C. Ashton and Kibeom Lee using lexical studies. The HEXACO model adds a sixth factor, honesty-humility, to five factors similar to those in the Big Five: emotionality, extraversion, agreeableness, conscientiousness, and openness to experience. Despite these similarities, the facet structures of traits in the HEXACO model differ from those in the five factor model. In addition to these trait-specific facets, Ashton and Lee have proposed two "interstitial" facets located in the space between traits. The first, altruism (versus antagonism), is shared by honesty-humility, agreeableness, and emotionality. The second, negative self-evaluation, is shared by extraversion and emotionality. The following table displays the trait and facet labels used by Ashton and Lee.

- Honesty-humility: Sincerity, fairness, greed avoidance, modesty
- Emotionality: Fearfulness, anxiety, dependence, sentimentality
- Extraversion: Social self-esteem, social boldness, sociability, liveliness
- Agreeableness: Forgivingness, gentleness, flexibility, patience
- Conscientiousness: Organization, diligence, perfectionism, prudence
- Openness to experience: Aesthetic appreciation, inquisitiveness, creativity, unconventionality
- Interstitial: Altruism
