= Ken Winters =

American psychologist

Ken C. Winters
- Born: March 31, 1953 (age 73)
- Education: University of Minnesota; Stony Brook University
- Scientific career
- Fields: Psychology
- Institutions: Oregon Research Institute; University of Minnesota
- Thesis: A Psychological Study of Remitted Manics (1982)

Ken C. Winters (born March 31, 1953) is an American psychologist known for his research on addictive behaviors, with an emphasis on adolescent substance use and problem gambling. He is a senior scientist at the Oregon Research Institute (Minnesota location). He previously served as a tenured professor in the Department of Psychiatry at the University of Minnesota, as well as the following: consultant for the Native Center for Behavioral Health, located at the University of Iowa; Senior Scientist with the Philadelphia, Pennsylvania-based Treatment Research Institute; adjunct faculty member in the Department of Psychology at the University of Minnesota; and a Research Associate Professor for the Office of Research and Economic Development at Florida International University. He was founder and director of the University of Minnesota's Center for Adolescent Substance Abuse Research for twenty-five years, co-founded in 2018 Smart Approaches to Marijuana Minnesota, and he was named in 2013 chairman of the Scientific Advisory Board of the National Center for Responsible Gaming.
