= Assessio =

Swedish psychometric software company

Assessio is a Swedish multinational SaaS company that develops psychometric tests. Assessio was established by the Swedish Psychological Association in 1954. In 1991, Assessio was acquired by Hunter Mabon and has since grown into an international test publisher and HR-consulting firm.

By 2008 the company had offices in Sweden, Finland, Norway, Denmark, and the Netherlands. In Norway, Assessio is the largest provider of recruitment tests.

In 1991 the psychology research institute then known as the Swedish Test Publishing Company was bought by Hunter Mabon, a Scottish professor of psychology. Mabon helped diversify the organization toward the business sector, specializing in recruitment and selection. By investing heavily in digitizing scientific selection methods, the company was testing around 70,000 selection candidates each month. In 2019 Assessio was sold to CVC Capital Partners, a private investment firm.

Assessio has produced a range of instruments such as Predicting Job Performance (PJP) tests and tests that measure General Mental Ability (GMA). Assessio is also the Norwegian representative and distributor of other assessments, including the Myers-Briggs Type Indicator (MBTI), the 16PF Questionnaire, Hogan Assessments, and Raven's Progressive Matrices.

== Publications ==
- Brown, Thomas E. (2005). Brown attention-deficit disorder scales: for children and adolescents. Assessio. ISBN 9789174183153.
- Delis, Dean and Edith Kaplan (2005). D-KEFS: Stimulusbok. Assessio. ISBN 9789174183313.
- Hathaway, Starke R. and J.C. McKinley (2004). MMPI-2: Minnesota multiphasic personality inventory-2. Assessio. ISBN 9789174183030.
- Holland, John L. and Amy B. Powell (2014). Vägvisaren: planering för utbildning, yrke och karriär. Assessio. ISBN 9789174182040.
- Ginsburg, Gunnel (2002). NEPSY: testprotokoll 3:0-4:11 år. Assessio. ISBN 9789174182828.
- Mabon, Hunter (2004). Arbetspsykologisk testning: Om urvalsmetoder i arbetslivet. Assessio. ISBN 9789174183085.
- Russell, Mary T. and Darcie L. Karol (2004). 16PF: A Manual. Assessio. ISBN 9789174183023.
- Watson, Goodwin and Edwin Glaser (2005). Evaluering av kritisk tenkning. Assessio. ISBN 9789174183306.
- Wechsler, David (2003). WISC-III-Wechsler Intelligence Scale for Children. Assessio. ISBN 9789174182880.
- Wiig, Elisabeth H. (2003). Alzheimer's quick test: assessment parietal function. Assessio. ISBN 9789174182934.
