= International Personality Item Pool =

Collaboratory of public domain personality test items

The International Personality Item Pool (IPIP) is a public domain collection of items for use in personality tests. It is managed by the Oregon Research Institute.

The pool contains 3,329 items. These items make up more than 250 inventories that measure a variety of personality factors, many of which correlate well to better-known systems such as the 16PF Questionnaire and the Big Five personality traits. IPIP provides journal citations to trace those inventories back to the publication as well as correlation tables between questions of the same factor and between results from different inventories for comparison. Scoring keys that mention the items used for a test are given in a list form; they can be formatted into questionnaires.

Many broad-bandwidth personality inventories (e.g., MMPI, NEO-PI) are proprietary. As a result, researchers cannot freely deploy those instruments and, thus, cannot contribute to further instrument development. An additional problem is that these proprietary instruments are rarely revised, with some having items that are dated. One purpose of IPIP is to remedy that situation.

The IPIP website does not provide any tests formatted for administration. However, websites that use the IPIP inventories for testing are available:

- IPIP-NEO-120 is an IPIP version of the NEO-PI-R test. The site is hosted by John A. Johnson, the author of the shorter equivalent inventory. The longer equivalent from 1999 was created by Lewis Goldberg who also created IPIP.
- Open Source Psychometrics Project hosts Goldberg's 50-question version of the Big Five traits and an IPIP emulation of the 16PF questionnaire.

== See also ==
- Psychological testing
