= Saucier (surname) =

Saucier is an occupational surname literally meaning the cooking occupation of "saucier". Notable people with the surname include:

- Aldric Saucier (1936–2016), American scientist and whistleblower
- Billy Jack Saucier (1931–1987), American fiddler
- Deborah Saucier, Métis Canadian neuroscientist and academic administrator
- Frank Saucier (1926–2025), American baseball player
- Gerard Saucier, American academic and psychologist
- Guylaine Saucier (born 1946), Canadian businesswoman
- Jocelyne Saucier (born 1948), Canadian journalist and novelist
- Kevin Saucier (born 1956), American baseball player
- Kristian Saucier (born c. 1987), American sailor
- Linda Phillips Gilbert Saucier (born 1948), American mathematician and textbook author
- Robert Saucier (born 1955), American politician
