= Lewis Goldberg =

American psychologist (1932–2026)

- Born: January 28, 1932; Chicago, Illinois, U.S.
- Died: March 29, 2026 (aged 94)
- Education: Harvard University; University of Michigan
- Occupation: Psychologist
- Employer: University of Oregon
- Known for: Personality measurement
- Parent(s): Max and Gertrude Goldberg
- Awards: Jack Block Award (2006); Saul Sells Award (2006); Bruno Klopfer Award (2009)

Lewis Robert Goldberg (January 28, 1932 – March 29, 2026) was an American personality psychologist and academic who was a professor emeritus at the University of Oregon. He was closely associated with the lexical hypothesis that any culturally important personality characteristic will be represented in the language of that culture. This hypothesis led to a five factor structure of personality trait adjectives (which he dubbed the Big 5). When applied to personality items this structure is also known as the five-factor model (FFM) of personality. He is the creator of the International Personality Item Pool(IPIP), a website that provides public-domain personality measures.

== Early life and education ==
Lewis Robert Goldberg was born in Chicago, Illinois on January 28, 1932. His early education took place at the Bret Harte elementary school in Chicago, and the Highland Park High School in Highland Park, Illinois. In 1953 Goldberg received an A.B. in social relations from Harvard University. He earned a Ph.D. in psychology from the University of Michigan in 1958 where his Ph.D. advisor was E. Lowell Kelly; Kelly provided Goldberg with training in the methodology of quantitative personality assessment.

== Academic career ==
As an advanced graduate student at Michigan, Goldberg met Warren T Norman, a new assistant professor, who became a lifelong friend and collaborator on issues in personality structure and assessment. Their initial work together on the generality of the Big 5, and their subsequent work on the lexical hypothesis has had a major impact upon the development of a consensual model of personality. After receiving his doctorate, Goldberg became a visiting assistant professor at Stanford University. Since 1960 he has taught at the University of Oregon, where he is professor emeritus. He is a senior scientist at the Oregon Research Institute, where he has carried out research since 1961.

From 1962 to 1966, Goldberg served as a field selection officer for the United States Peace Corps. In 1966 he became a Fulbright professor at the University of Nijmegen, the Netherlands. In 1970 he spent a year as a visiting professor at the University of California, Berkeley.

In 1974 he was a Fulbright professor again, at Istanbul University in Turkey. From 1980 to 1986 he served as a consultant in the Intelligence Division of the United States Secret Service. He was a fellow at the Netherlands Institute for Advanced Study from 1981 to 1982.

Goldberg published more than 150 research articles. He has also earned three lifetime achievement awards: the Jack Block Award for outstanding contributions to personality research from the Society for Personality and Social Psychology (SPSP) (2006), the Saul Sells Award for outstanding contributions to multivariate research from the Society of Multivariate Experimental Psychology (SMEP) (2006), and most recently the Bruno Klopfer Award for outstanding contributions to personality assessment from the Society for Personality Assessment (SPA) (2009).

== Personality structure and measurement ==
Throughout his career, Goldberg has made substantial contributions to the measurement of personality. His early work examined the multidimensional structure of adjectival descriptors sampled from prior lexical work of Norman. This was an important contribution suggesting that the "Big Five" factors of peer ratings could be identified in adjectives representing a sample of the lexicon. Subsequent work on the lexical hypothesis, in collaboration with two prominent Dutch scholars, suggested that the structure could be seen as a set of circumplexes embedded in five dimensional spaces. Goldberg also did a study on act-frequency signatures of the “Big Five” and how much in our incidental or everyday behavior that we show signature behavior pertaining to the “Big Five.” These five aspects showed up numerous times during the reported study and this shows that we exhibit behavioral signatures of the “Big Five,” those being extraversion, agreeableness, conscientiousness, emotional stability, and intellect. This is important as Goldberg's research may help enrich our understanding of our everyday mundane actions and how our personality affects it.

Goldberg and his colleagues later released the International Personality Item Pool, which is an international "Collaboratory" which contains more than 3,000 short item stems summarizing the content of many personality inventories. At least 250 separate scales have been developed from the IPIP items, and at least some of the items have been translated into more than 35 languages. Validity data for these scales comes from a longitudinal sample of approximately 800 community volunteers in the cities of Eugene and Springfield in Oregon. These participants have taken the IPIP items as well as proprietary instruments measuring temperamental traits, occupational interests, and various activities. Goldberg, in his typically open spirit of collaborative science, provides the data from the Eugene-Springfield sample to interested researchers.

== Personality consistency over the lifespan ==
With his colleague Sarah Hampson, Goldberg initiated a 40-year follow up to a study started by John Digman at the University of Hawaii. This study is examining the health outcomes in middle adulthood associated with personality rating in middle school.

== Personality and prediction ==
Goldberg's early work compared clinical versus actuarial prediction. Even when predicting clinically difficult criteria, he showed that actuarial models were superior to clinical judgment.

== Other major publications ==
Besides his articles discussing the dimensions of personality, Goldberg has also contributed to the studies showing the importance of personality for predicting important life outcomes with his colleagues Brent Roberts, Nathan Kuncel, Rebecca Shiner and Avshalom Caspi.

His methodological papers includes the development of the "bass-ackwards" procedure for assessing hierarchical structures. as well as his careful comparison of multiple ways to form personality scales for prediction.

== Boards and committees ==
Goldberg served on the Personality and Cognition Research Review Committee and the Cognition, Emotion, and Personality Research Review Committee of the National Institute of Mental Health and on the Graduate Record Examination Board Research Committee. Goldberg has previously served as the president of the Society of Multivariate Experimental Psychology (1974–1975) the Association for Research in Personality (2004–2006) and The World Association for Personality Psychology (2019–2024). He is a fellow of the American Psychological Association, the Association for Psychological Science, and the Society for Personality and Social Psychology.

== Death ==
Goldberg died on March 29, 2026, at the age of 94.
