= Naomi Takemoto-Chock =

Hawaiian psychologist

Naomi Takemoto-Chock is a Hawaiian psychologist, known for her contributions to the Big Five personality traits.

Her article "Factors" has been widely cited in literature.

== Bibliography ==
- John M. Digman; Naomi K. Takemoto-Chock. "Factors In The Natural Language Of Personality: Re-Analysis, Comparison, And Interpretation Of Six Major Studies". Multivariate Behavioral Research.
