= Surgency =

Personality trait of cheerfulness, spontaneity and sociability

Surgency is a temperament dimension that considers an individual’s disposition toward positive affect. The APA Dictionary of Psychology defines it as "a personality trait marked by cheerfulness, responsiveness, spontaneity, and sociability but at a level below that of extraversion or mania".

== Overview ==
According to Mary K. Rothbart's theory, surgency is one of three broad domains that encompass the structure of temperament. The concept of surgency is characterised by high positive affect and activity levels. As described by Rebecca Shiner and Avshalom Caspi, individuals high in surgency are highly sociable, and not shy. The concept is mainly used in developmental psychology literature.

There are subtle changes in how surgency is expressed across development. It first emerges during infancy in the form of smiling and laughter. As infants enter childhood, high surgency becomes associated with lower levels of effortful control. A 2003 meta-analysis of gender differences in temperament showed a small to moderate gender difference in surgency levels between boys and girls, with boys showing higher levels of surgency and "generally indicating that boys are slightly more active, less shy, and derive more pleasure than girls from high-intensity stimuli."

In children, surgency is also characterised by high levels of activity and positive emotion, impulsivity, and engagement with their environment. This perceived change in what characterises surgency is likely due to the difficulty of assessing these factors in infants, who lack the complex motor skills to reflect impulsivity.

In adulthood, surgency overlaps with extraversion, and includes a high level of sociability, and a low level of inhibitory control.

== Measurement and assessment ==
=== Historical perspectives ===
Thurstone and Thurstone associated surgency with the concept of "fluency" both in speech and in writing. Cattell found that of all of the objective tests developed for assessing temperament, the fluency tests were the most valid for testing surgency. Studman had also come to similar conclusions.

=== Contemporary assessments ===
One way that developmental psychology researchers measure surgency is by developing questionnaires. Items in these questionnaires relate to behaviours and reactions to stimuli that may indicate a temperament high in surgency. Mary K. Rothbart is a forerunner in this field. She and her colleagues developed questionnaires which cover infancy (through parent-report questionnaires) to adulthood (through self-report questionnaires). Parent-report questionnaires are widely used based on the assumption that parents are natural observers of their children. Critics of this method argue that parent-report questionnaires are biased or reflect the parent’s own traits rather than their child’s actual temperament.

An alternative approach involves naturalistic or structured observation of children in the home, school, or laboratory settings. In laboratory-based assessments, including the Laboratory Temperament Assessment Battery (Lab-TAB), variations in reactions to stimuli are examined. Children are exposed to standardized stimuli, such as novel toys, and their behavioural response (such as frequency of smiling or laughter) is measured and systematically coded. This method attempts to isolate specific behaviours while minimising subjective impressions.

Although laboratory-based methods have been criticized for lacking ecological validity, research by Rothbart et al. (2000) demonstrated a strong correlation between laboratory and parent-report measures of surgency indicators, such as smiling and laughter, across the first year of life.

Another limitation of measuring surgency is that behavioural expressions of surgency undergo significant changes from childhood to adolescence. During infancy, high activity levels are measured by frequently moving around a crib, whereas throughout childhood it is measured by behaviours such as jumping and running in response to environmental stimuli. As children age, activity levels shift from movement to talking, because children gain control over their motor output, and their active need for action becomes satisfied by social activities. This may complicate longitudinal comparisons tracking surgency unless age-appropriate adjustments are made.

More modern researchers emphasise the importance of using a combination of methods to gain a deeper understanding of surgency in developmental psychology. This includes integrating questionnaire data with observational measures to better capture the complexity of the construct across developmental stages.

== Genetic and environmental influences ==
Surgency is a heritable trait, similar to most other temperament dimensions. In 1988, Auke Tellegan and colleagues estimated that genetic factors could explain approximately 40% of the variation observed in positive emotionality and extraversion. In 1997, Goldsmith and colleagues highlighted that these traits were additionally influenced by the environment. In 2024, Lior Abramson and colleagues claimed that "investigating heritability in different developmental periods is essential because the expression of genetic and environmental effects on temperament may change across development".

== Neural correlates ==
Studies suggest that surgency/extraversion is linked to brain activity in regions associated with emotion and reward processing. In 2004, Canli discovered a positive correlation between increased activation in the amygdala and extraversion. In 2015, Kujawa and colleagues found that children who scored high in positive emotionality at age three exhibited a stronger neural response to rewards six years later.

While surgency is strongly associated with positive affect, different brain mechanisms may be at play depending on the context.

== Role of surgency in learning ==
Temperament significantly influences how children interact and learn within classroom environments. Research suggests that children with low surgency, characterised by apprehension to new people and events, social withdrawal, and heightened caution, are more sensitive to both positive and negative teacher socialisation efforts than their high-surgency peers. This increased sensitivity is often attributed to their observational learning style, particularly in novel or uncertain situations.

Low-surgency children typically exhibit anxiety in unfamiliar settings and are more likely to monitor their environment and the behaviour of authority figures, such as teachers. This aligns with social cognitive theories, which emphasise learning through observation rather than direct participation.

In contrast, high-surgency children tend to be highly active, sociable, and impulsive, frequently seeking out social engagement and environmental stimulation. They often display a reduced focus on rules or adult cues. Their preference for active exploration over observation may limit their sensitivity to indirect forms of teacher guidance, and increase their reliance on direct interaction for learning.

These differences in behavioural and physiological tendencies suggest that teacher socialisation strategies may have varying effects depending on a child's temperament. Low-surgency children may benefit from observational opportunities, while high-surgency children are more likely to learn effectively through active, direct engagement with teachers.

== See also ==
- Personality psychology
- Positive affectivity
- Negative affectivity
- Temperament

== Notes ==
Much of the structure and content in this article is based on: Holmboe, Karla (2016), "Surgency", in Zeigler-Hill, Virgil; Shackelford, Todd K. (eds.), Encyclopedia of Personality and Individual Differences, Cham: Springer International Publishing, pp. 1–6, doi:10.1007/978-3-319-28099-8_2123-1, ISBN 978-3-319-28099-8
