= Gerard Saucier =

American psychologist (born 1955)

- Born: February 21, 1955 (age 71)
- Education: Deep Springs College; University of North Carolina at Chapel Hill; University of Oregon
- Occupation: Psychologist
- Employer: University of Oregon

Gerard Saucier (born February 21, 1955) is an American psychologist. He is a professor in the department of Psychology at the University of Oregon. He has co-authored many academic articles on personality. He won the 1999 Cattell Early Career Research Award from the Society of Multivariate Experimental Psychology.
