= Warren Norman (psychologist) =

American psychologist (1930–1998)

- Born: 1930
- Died: 1998 (aged 67–68)
- Education: University of Minnesota
- Occupations: social psychologist, professor
- Years active: 1959-1998
- Known for: Big Five Personality Traits

Warren T. Norman (1930–1998) was a psychologist recognized for his research on personality psychology, particularly in establishing the Five-Factor Model (FFM), also known as Norman's "Big 5". These dimensions, extraversion, agreeableness, conscientiousness, neuroticism, and openness to experience, are foundational aspects of contemporary personality theory. He was the Head of the Department of Psychology at the University of Michigan and worked there for thirty seven years.

== Education ==
Norman earned degrees from the University of Minnesota, obtaining a Bachelor of Science in Mathematics and Natural Science in 1952. In 1955 he earned a Master of Arts in Statistics and Educational Psychology, followed by a Ph.D. in Psychology in 1957.

His spent most of his career at the University of Michigan. He was the Head of the Department of Psychology and Chairman of the University Senate. He wrote many papers and contributed to numerous psychological associations and editorial boards.

== Career ==
Norman spent thirty-seven years at the University of Michigan. While there, he developed several notable hypotheses, published papers, and continued his research in personality psychology. In 1963 he dismissed the deviation hypothesis, demonstrating "that subtle test content was equally as useful as obvious content in constructing self-report scales."

Another 1963 work about categorizing personality traits, Toward an Adequate Taxonomy of Personality Attributes, Norman identified consistent patterns regarding how individuals rate each other's personalities. This work influenced the Five Factor Model.

Rounding out a productive 1963, he published his most well-known work, the Five-Factor Model (FFM). This theory is considered a classic model for measuring and describing personality traits. It measures openness, conscientiousness, extraversion, agreeableness, and neuroticism. The theory has also become known as "Norman's Big Five."

In 1967 he published 2800 Personality Trait Descriptors, in which he documented personality traits in detail, presenting a list of characteristics to definitively describe personality traits.

Throughout his career he served in many leadership positions for psychology societies, journals, and organizations. He also worked at the Oregon Research Institute, the University of Birmingham in England, as well as the University of Queensland and University of Western Australia. He was the 1971 president of the Society of Multivariate Experimental Psychology (SMEP).
