= Franziska Baumgarten =

Swiss psychologist

Franziska Baumgarten-Tramer
- Born: Franziska Baumgarten; 1883
- Died: March 1, 1970
- Education: University of Zurich
- Scientific career
- Thesis: Die Erkenntnislehre von Maine de Biran, ein historische studie (1911)

Franziska Baumgarten-Tramèr (1883–1970) was an industrial psychologist, professor, and researcher. She is known for her work on the effects of war and trauma, aptitude testing, and gifted schoolchildren.

== Early life ==
Baumgarten was born in Łódź, Poland in 1886 or 1883. She graduated from gymnasium in 1901 and then in 1905 went to study literature and philosophy at the University of Krakow. There her interest in understanding human emotion led her to the field of psychology. In 1908 she moved to the University of Zurich where she worked with Gustav Störring, before moving to the University of Bonn and then to Berlin. After hearing a lecture by Hugo Münsterberg, she decided to become an industrial psychologist.

== Career ==
In Krakow she studied under the founder of the first experimental psychology laboratory in Poland, Władysław Heinreich where she completed her Ph.D. in 1911 on Maine de Biran's theory of knowledge. In 1919 she took a position lecturing at the University of Berne, and in 1929, she completed a habilitation on methodology of scientific testing at the University of Berne. Starting in 1930 Baumgarten lectured in psychology at the University of Bern, a position she continued until 1953 or 1954 when the university named her an honorary professor.

== Research ==
Baumgarten was a psychologist known for her work in the fields of occupational psychology, professional ethics, and aptitude testing. Her early research examined why children lie and gratitude in children. She went on to research gifted students and ones on aptitude testing. She invented 3 aptitude tests in 1922: the Tremometer, the Zeitmebanordung, and the Bewegungsprufer, which measured hand steadiness, time, and hand movements, respectively. She continued her studies of gifted children, examining personalities and aptitudes versus observed intelligence. Her work involved self-designed aptitude testing at work, and discuss the impacts of personality and character traits of individual behavior. She furthered this in one of her most specialties, her focus on the effects of war on children.

== Honors and awards ==
In 1953 Baumgarten received an honorary professorship from the University of Bern.

== Personal life ==
In 1924, Baumgarten married Moritz Tramer, a child psychiatrist. The couple moved to Bern together in 1945 where some of their research was jointly published.

== Selected publications ==
- Baumgarten, Franziska (1927). "Die Lüge Bei Kindern und Jugendlichen". Annalen der Philosophie und Philosophischen Kritik. 6: 144.
- Baumgarten, F., & Crescott, D. A. (1928). Why Children hate: An experimental investigation of the reactions of school children in Poland to the enemy occupation. Journal of Educational Psychology, 19, 303-312.
- Baumgarten, Franciska (1935). "Un Test Pour l'Examen des Gouts des Enfants et des Adultes". Le Travail Humain. 3 (3): 283–296. ISSN 0041-1868. JSTOR 40658611.
- Baumgarten, Franziska; Nobs, Hans (1936). Die Dankbarkeit bei Kindern und Jugendlichen (in German). A. Francke.
- Baumgarten, F. (1944). Demokratie und Charakter. Zurich: Rascher.
- Baumgarten, Franciska (1955). Die Regulierungskräfte im Seelenleben. Lenhen-Verlag. OCLC 1332399779.
