= Oregon Research Institute =

U.S. psychology research institute

The Oregon Research Institute is an American psychology research institute in Eugene, Oregon.

It manages the International Personality Item Pool.
