= Personality change =

Differences in patterns over time

Personality change refers to the different forms of change in various aspects of personality. An individual's personality may stay somewhat consistent throughout their life, though there is evidence that an individual's personality can change throughout their lifetime.

Social interactions, culture of origin, life stage, lived experience, and significant events (especially traumatic events) can all alter a person's external perceptions and self-concept to a degree which could facilitate a change in personality.

There is an ongoing debate as to what encompasses personality and why personality changes. The development of personality is often dependent on the stage of life a person is in. Most development occurs in the earlier stages of life and becomes more stable as one grows into adulthood.

While still uncertain, research suggests that genetics play a role in the change and stability of certain traits in a personality. They have also discovered that environmental sources affect personality too. The debate over nature versus nurture has been pervasive the field of psychology since its beginning. Culture is also a large factor in personality trait differences as well.

== Definition ==
Personality, one's characteristic way of feeling, behaving and thinking, is often conceptualized as a person's standing on each Big Five personality trait (extraversion, neuroticism, openness to experience, agreeableness and conscientiousness). A person's personality profile is thus gauged from their standing on five broad concepts which predict, among other life outcomes, behavior and the quality of interpersonal relationships. Initially, it was believed that one's Big Five profile was static and dichotomous in that one was either at one extreme of each trait or another For example, people are typically categorized as introverted or extraverted. Personality was therefore assessed in terms of generalities or averages. Some researchers also noticed significant inconsistencies in how people behaved across situations, challenging the traditional notion of stable personality traits.

This school of thought attributes behavior to environmental factors, relegating individual differences to situational artifacts and contesting the existence of individual predispositions. It was led by situationists like Walter Mischel (1968). Their contention held that personality was a fictitious concept. For them, the discrepancies observed across one's behaviors were evidence that inter-individual differences did not exist Some aspects of the situationist perspective even suggest that all people are the same and that the differences observed are simply illusory byproducts of the environment.

However, some personality psychologists soon integrated these inconsistencies into their conceptualization of personality. Some work suggests that people can adopt different levels of a personality dimension as the social situations and time of day change. This work also suggests that intrapersonal variations on a trait can be even larger than interpersonal variations. Extraversion varies more within a person than across individuals, for example. This work was based on individual self-ratings during the day across a long period of time. This allowed for researchers to assess moment-to-moment and day to day variations on personality attributes.

== Impact of social roles ==
In addition, social roles (e.g. employee) have been identified as potential sources of personality change. Researchers have found strong correspondences between the demands of a social role and one's personality profile. If the role requires that the person enacting it be conscientious, their standing on this trait is more likely to be high. Conversely, once they leave that role or takes on another which entails less conscientiousness, they will manifest a lower level standing on that trait. Longitudinal research demonstrates that people's personality trajectories can often be explained by the social roles they adopted and relinquished throughout their life stages. Thus social roles are often studied as fundamental predictors of personality. The goals associated with them elicit the appropriation of certain personality profiles by the people enacting them. For example, employees judged effective by their peers and superiors are often described as conscientious.

Personality also changes through life stages. This may be due to physiological changes associated with development but also experiences that impact behavior. Adolescence and young adulthood have been found to be prime periods of personality changes, especially in the domains of extraversion and agreeableness. It has long been believed that personality development is shaped by life experiences that intensify the propensities that led individuals to those experiences in the first place, which is known as the correspondence principle.

Subsequent research endeavors have integrated these findings in their methods of investigation. Researchers distinguish between mean level and rank order changes in trait standing during old age. Their study of personality trajectories is thus contingent on time and on age considerations. Mottus, Johnson and Geary (2012) found that instability engendered by aging does not necessarily affect one's standing within an age cohort. Hence, fluctuations and stability coexist so that one changes relative to one's former self but not relative to one's peers. Similarly, other psychologists found that neuroticism, extraversion (only in men), and openness decreased with age after 70, but conscientiousness and agreeableness increased with age (the latter only in men). Moreover, they suggest that there is a decline on each trait after the age of 81.

== Inconsistency as a trait ==
Personality inconsistency has become such a prevalent consideration for personologists that some even conceptualize it as a predisposition in itself. Fleisher and Woehr (2008) suggest that consistency across the Big Five is a construct that is fairly stable and contributes to the predictive validity of personality measures. Hence, inconsistency is quantifiable much like a trait, and constitutes an index of — and enhances — the fit of psychological models.

To accommodate the inconsistency demonstrated on personality tests, researchers developed the frame of reference principle (FOR). This refers to the set of conjectures an individual or group of individuals uses to judge ideas, actions, and experiences to create meaning. FOR's include beliefs, values, schemas, preferences and culture. This can lead to prejudice, biases, and stereotypes due to the limited view an individual has. According to this theory, people tend to think of their personality in terms of a specific social context when they are asked to rate them. Whichever environment is cognitively prominent at the time of the personality measurement will influence the respondent's ratings on a trait measure. If, for example, the person is thinking in terms of their student identity, then the personality ratings they report will most likely reflect the profile they espouse in the context of student life. Accounting for the FOR principle aims at increasing the validity of personality measures. This demonstrates that the predictive validity of personality measures which specify a social context is higher than those measures which take a more generic approach.

This point is substantiated by yet another body of work suggesting that FOR instructions moderated the link between extraversion and openness scores on manager ratings of employee performance This research thus recognizes that the importance of intrapersonal fluctuations contingent on personality is context specific and is not necessarily generalizable across social domains and time.

There are several different FOR's:

- Compensatory Frame of Reference
- Rehabilitative Frame of Reference
- Biomechanical Frame of Reference
- Psychoanalytic Frame of Reference
- Psychodynamic Frame of Reference: is based on Freud's theories of Interpersonal relationships and unconscious drives.
- Developmental Frame of Reference
- Behavioral Frame of Reference
- Cognitive-Behavioral Frame of Reference
- Psychospiritual Integration Frame of Reference: stresses the nature of spirituality, the expression of spirituality in professional/work related behaviors, and how spirituality affects an individual's health and well-being. There are six elements: becoming, meaning, being, centeredness, connectedness, and transcendence.
- Occupational Adaptation Frame of Reference
- Social Participation Frame of Reference
- Acquisitional Frame of Reference

== Process of change ==
Personality is one of the strongest and most consistent predictors of subjective well-being while simultaneously subject to change.

Research has found a correlation between being multilingual and personality, specifically how one may change personality based on the language currently being spoken. One who is raised bilingual or lived a number of years in a foreign country and learned the language of the land not only experience personality change but often adopt different personalities based on the language they are speaking. These changes are often based on cultural norms of the language's origin.

A study published in 2012 found that "personality does change and that the extent to which personality changes is comparable to other characteristics, such as income, unemployment and marital status". Some of the biggest concerns faced in life are the previously listed factors - how much money does one make (income)? Does one have a job or not (unemployment)? Does one have a lifelong companion (marital status)? These situations can lead to bigger, more complex situations. If one seeks to be married but is not, they may become cold. If one has no job but then gets hired somewhere, they may become grateful and filled with hope. When positive changes happen, "personality... meaningfully predicts changes to life satisfaction". When one experiences a personality change, it can strongly determine how that person will then feel about life.

== Change over a lifetime ==
There are two very specific types of change that researchers tend to focus on: rank-order change and mean-level change. A rank-order change refers to a change in an individual's personality trait relative to other individuals; such changes do not occur very often. A mean-level change refers to an absolute change in the individual's level of a certain trait over time. Longitudinal research shows that mean-level change does occur.

During adolescence there are many increases or rapid changes in hormones, societal pressures, and environment factors. These experiences may factor into significant personality changes as one progresses through adolescence. As a person progresses through adulthood, their personality becomes more stable and predictable because they establish patterns of thinking, behaving, and feeling.

Personality does not stop changing at a specific age. Biological and social transitions in life may also be a factor for change. Biological transitions are stages like puberty or giving birth for the first time. Social transitions might be changes in social roles like becoming a parent or working at a first job. These life transitions do not necessarily cause change, but they may be reasons for change. One theory says that whether or not these life transitions cause personality change is based on whether the transition was expected based on age or was unforeseen. The events that are expected will cause personality change because those events have common scripts. However, events that are unexpected will give prominence to the traits that already exist for the individual. Historical context also affects personality change. Major life events can lead to changes in personality that can persist for more than a decade. A longitudinal study followed women over 30 years and found that they showed increases in individualism. This may have been due to the changes that were occurring in their country at the time.

Additionally, research done at Michigan State University at the Department of Psychology found that certain personality traits may exhibit predictable patterns as individuals age. Specifically, neuroticism, extraversion, and openness to experience tend to decline with age, while agreeableness and conscientiousness increase. These trends suggests that greater emotional stability and social maturity develop with age.

=== Stressful life events and trauma ===
Adverse life experiences, long-term difficulties, and deteriorated life quality, all predict small but persistent increases in neuroticism, while positive life events, and improved life quality, predict small but persistent decreases in neuroticism. There appears to be no point during the lifespan that neuroticism is immutable, which is known as the plasticity principle.

Traumatic brain injury can impact a person's personality, having an effect throughout the rest of their life.

=== Mechanisms of change ===
There are multiple ways for an individual's personality to change. Individuals will change their behavior based on the ideas in their environment that emit rewards and punishments. Some of these ideas might be implicit, like social roles. The individual changes their personality to fit into a social role if it is favorable. Other ideas might be more explicit like a parent trying to change a child's behavior.

Personality change also occurs when individuals observe the actions of others. Individuals may mimic the behaviors of others and then internalize those behaviors. Once the individual internalizes those behaviors, they are said to be a part of that person's personality. Individuals also receive feedback from other individuals or groups about their own personality. This is a driving force of change because the individual has social motivations to change their personality; people often act a certain way based on the popular/majority vote of the people they are around. For example, someone who likes country music may say they hate country music when they learn that all her peers dislike like country music. It has also been shown that major positive and negative life events can predict changes in personality. Some of the largest changes are observed in individuals with psychiatric or neurodegenerative disorders, such as Alzheimer's disease and related dementia. A meta-analysis found consistent evidence that large increases in neuroticism and large declines in the other major personality traits are observed in individuals with dementia. Similar changes were also found in a prospective study (N = 22,611) of self-rated personality.

==== Meditation ====
Studies have shown that mindfulness and meditation therapies have a positive effect of personality maturity.

==== Cognitive behavioral therapy ====
Cognitive behavioral therapy has been tested and proved to be effective in the treatment of adults with anxiety disorders.

==== Psilocybin therapy ====
Following psilocybin therapy, one study noted that neuroticism scores lowered substantially while extraversion increased.

== Big Five personality traits ==
The Big Five personality traits are often used to measure change in personality. There is a mean-level change in the Big Five traits from age 10 to 65. The trends seen in adulthood are different from trends seen in childhood and adolescence. Some research suggests that during adolescence rank-order change does occur and therefore personality is relatively unstable. Gender differences are also shown before adulthood. Conscientiousness drops from late childhood to adolescence, but then picks back up from adolescence into adulthood. A meta-analysis performed by Melissa C. O'Connor and Sampo V. Paunonen, "Big Five Personality Predictors of Post-Secondary Academic Performance", showed that "... conscientiousness, in particular, [is] most strongly and consistently associated with academic success". Agreeableness also drops from late childhood to adolescence, but picks back up from adolescence into adulthood. Neuroticism shows a different trend for males and females in childhood and adolescence. For females, neuroticism increases from childhood to adolescence, levels from adolescence into adulthood, and continues the adult trend of decreasing. Males, however, displayed a gradual decrease in neuroticism from childhood to adolescence into adulthood. Extraversion drops from childhood to adolescence and remains relatively stagnant. Openness to experience also shows a different trend for different genders. Females tend to decrease in openness to experience from childhood to early adulthood, then increases gradually throughout adulthood. Males tend to decrease in openness to experience from childhood to adolescence and increase during adulthood. The same study also revealed that openness to experience may be positively associated with scholastic achievement.

In adulthood, neuroticism tends to decrease, while conscientiousness and agreeableness tend to increase. Extraversion and openness to experience was not shown to fluctuate significantly during adulthood. The trends seen in adulthood differ from those seen in childhood and adolescence. Cross-cultural research on Big Five traits has shown that German, British, Czech, and Turkish people share similar occurrences of these personality traits. Similar trends have been described in at least fifty countries across the globe.

A 2011 study done by Deborah A. Cobb-Clark and Stefanie Schurer, "The Stability of Big-Five Personality Traits," showed that "On average, individuals report slightly higher levels of agreeableness, emotional stability, and conscientiousness than extraversion and openness to experience. [On top of that], women report higher scores on each trait except for openness to experience".

The Big Five personality traits can also be broken down into facets. Different facets of each personality trait are often correlated with different behavioral outcomes. Researchers have yet to reach a consensus regarding a metholdology for interpreting personality trait facets. However, some studies have communicated the importance of looking at change in personaliuty facets over a lifetime separate from trait deviation, as different facets of the same trait show different trends. For example, openness with values decreases substantially with age, while openness with aesthetics has been described as remaining consistent over time. Neuroticism can be broken into the two facets, anxiety and depression. Anxiety has the same trend as neuroticism for both males and females. For females, anxiety increases from childhood to adolescence and levels out during emerging adulthood, preceding a decrease into and throughout middle age. Anxiety in males tends to decrease from late childhood through adulthood. Depression (not clinical depression, but rather susceptibility to negative affect) shows two peaks in females. Females tend to have higher levels of depression in adolescence and then again in early adulthood. Depression does, however, have a negative trend through adulthood. For males, depression tends to show an increase from childhood to early adulthood and then shows a slight decrease through middle age. There are four facets that accompany extraversion: social self-esteem, liveliness, social boldness, and sociability. Social self-esteem, liveliness, and social boldness begin to increase during the mid-teens and continually increases throughout early adulthood and into late adulthood. Sociability seems to follow a different trend that is high during the early teens but decreases in early-adulthood, proceeding to stabilize around the age of 39.

== Late life ==
Although there is debate surrounding whether or not personality can change in the late stages of life, more evidence is being discovered about how the environmental factors affect people of all ages. Changes in health are regarded as an influential source of personality stability and change. Across multiple facets of health, which include cognitive, physical, and sensory functioning, older adults' ability to maintain their everyday routine and lifestyle is challenged. There are noticeable finds on reverse trends in maturity-related traits, such as increases in neuroticism and declines in conscientiousness.
