= Culture =

Social behavior and norms of a society

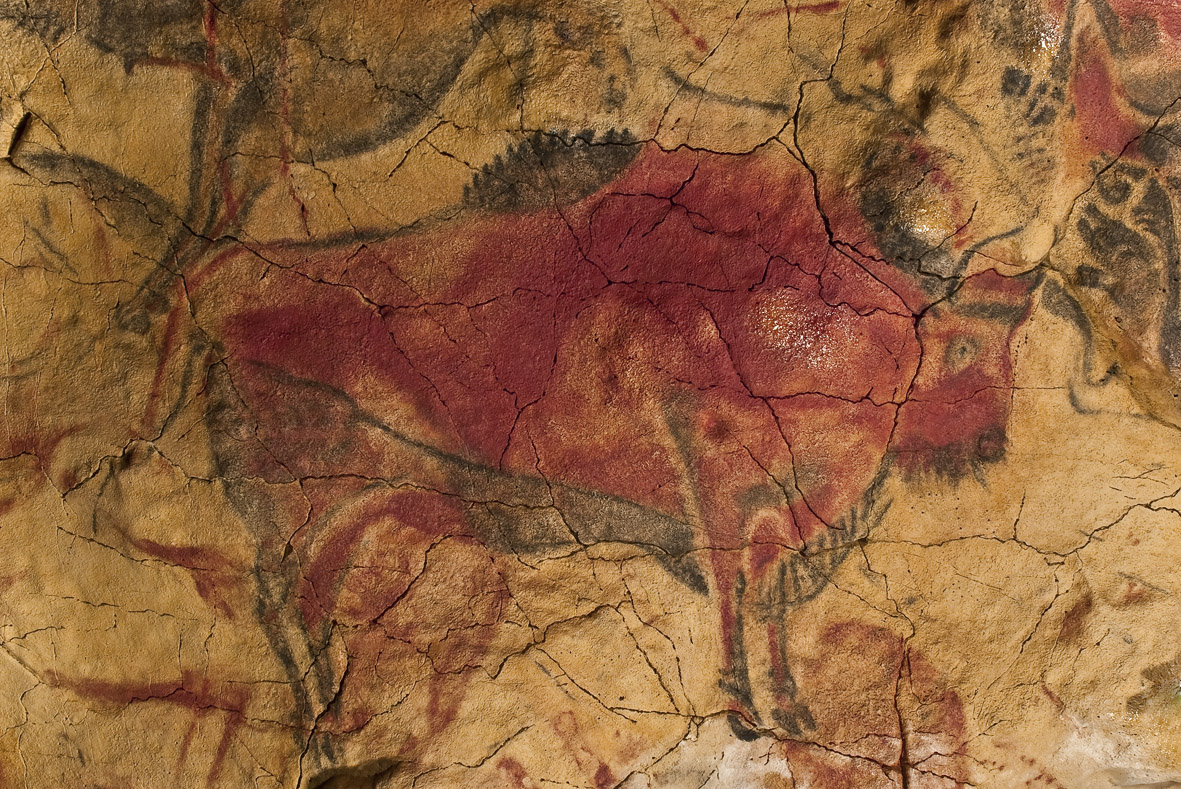
Symbolic expression developed as prehistoric humans reached behavioral modernity.

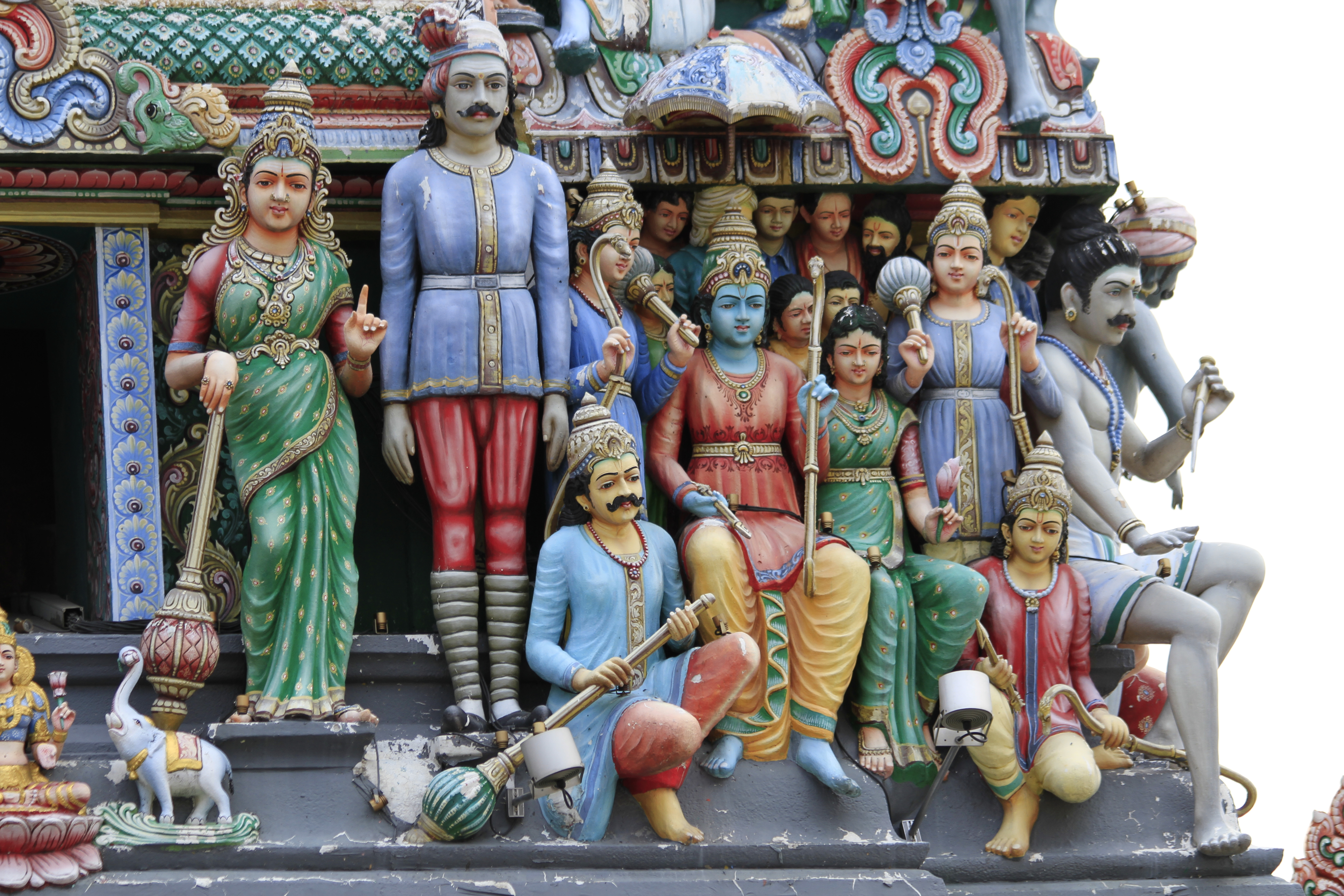
Religion and expressive art are important aspects of human culture.

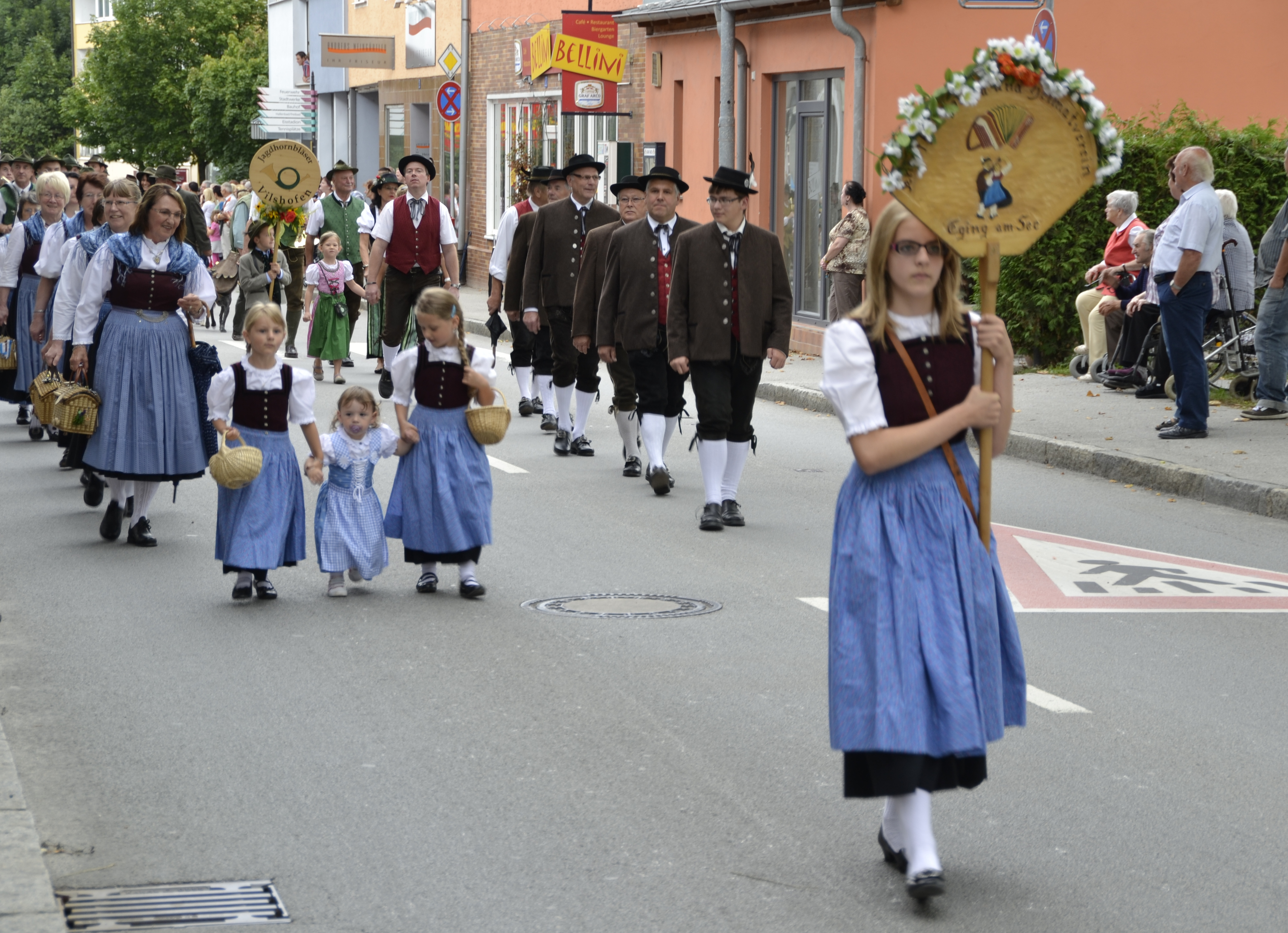
Germans marching during a folk culture celebration

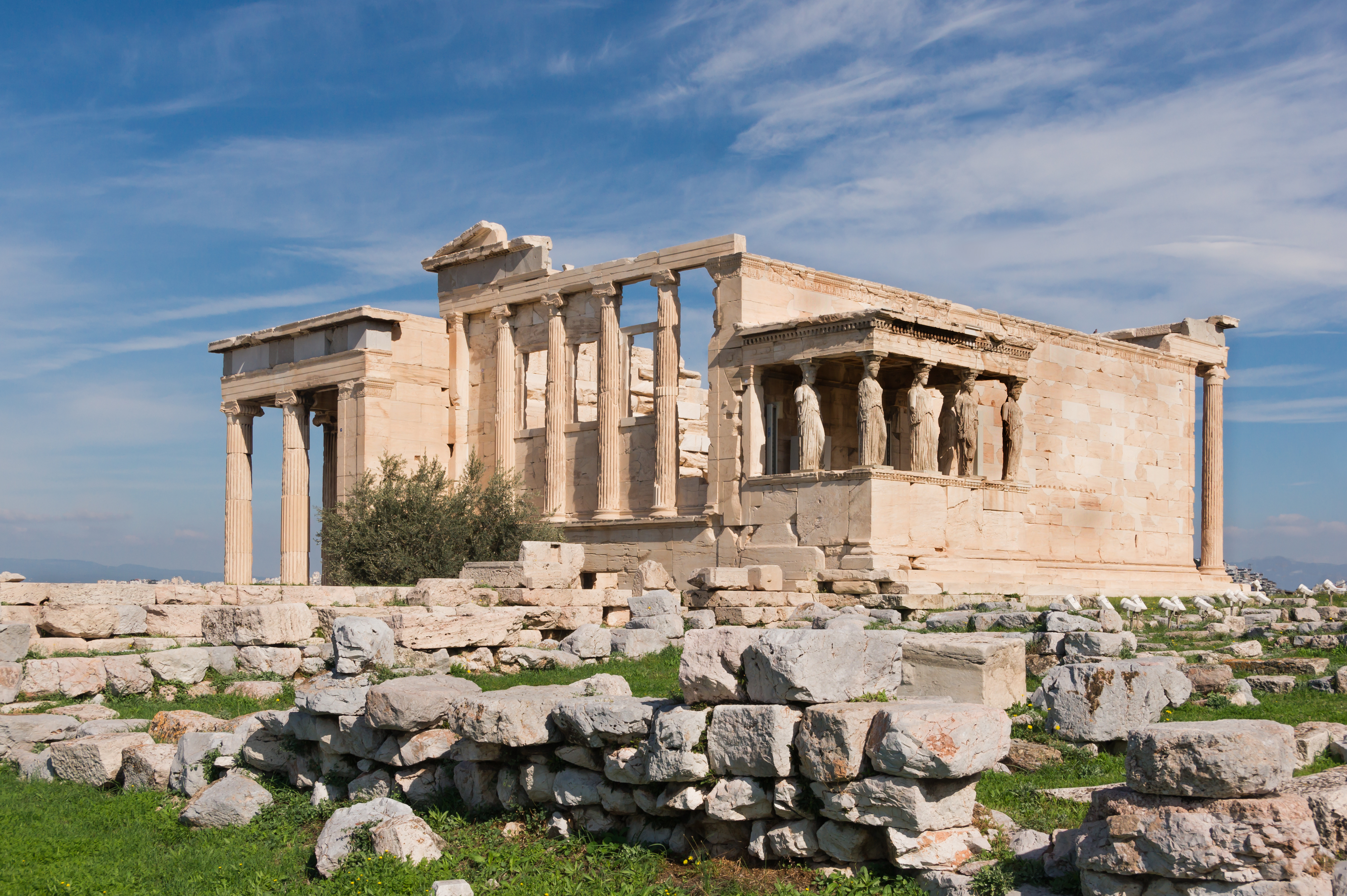
The Acropolis of Athens

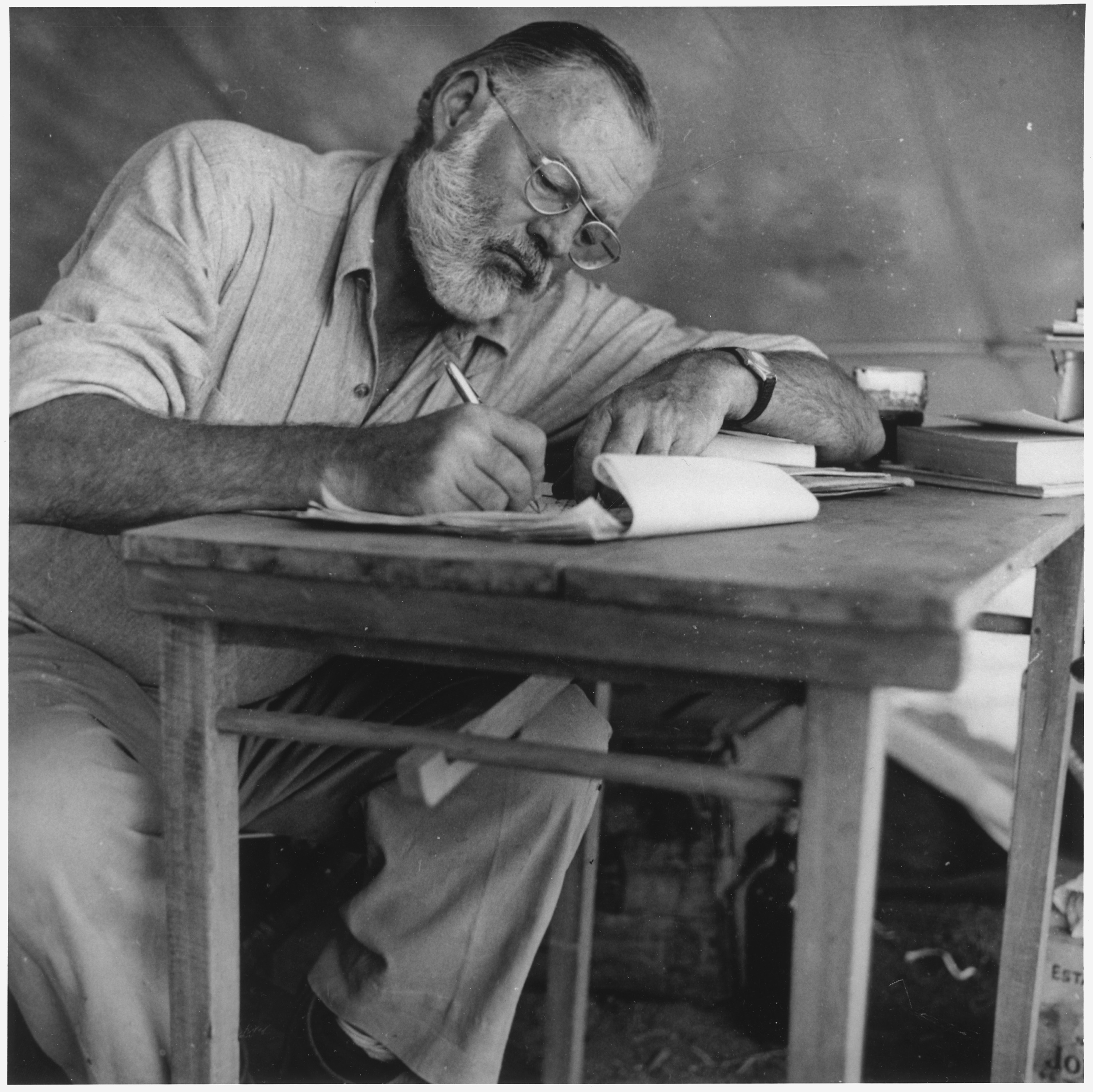
Ernest Hemingway writing. Writings often create a sense of cultural identity.

Culture (/ˈkʌltʃər/ KUL-chər or /ˈkʊltʃər/ KUUL-chər) is a concept that encompasses the social behavior, institutions, and norms found in human societies, as well as the knowledge, beliefs, arts, laws, customs, capabilities, attitudes, and habits of the individuals in these groups. Culture often originates from or is attributed to a specific region or location.

Humans acquire culture through the learning processes of enculturation and socialization, which is shown by the diversity of cultures across societies. A cultural norm codifies acceptable conduct in society; it serves as a guideline for behavior, dress, language, and demeanor in a situation, which serves as a template for expectations in a social group. Accepting only a monoculture in a social group can bear risks, just as a single species can wither in the face of environmental change, for lack of functional responses to such change. Thus in military culture, valor is counted as a typical behavior for an individual, and duty, honor, and loyalty to the social group are regarded as virtues or functional responses in the continuum of conflict. In religion, analogous attributes can be identified in a social group.

Cultural change, or repositioning, is the reconstruction of a cultural concept of a society. Cultures are internally affected by both forces encouraging change and forces resisting change. Cultures are externally affected via contact between societies. Organizations such as UNESCO attempt to preserve culture and cultural heritage.

== Description ==
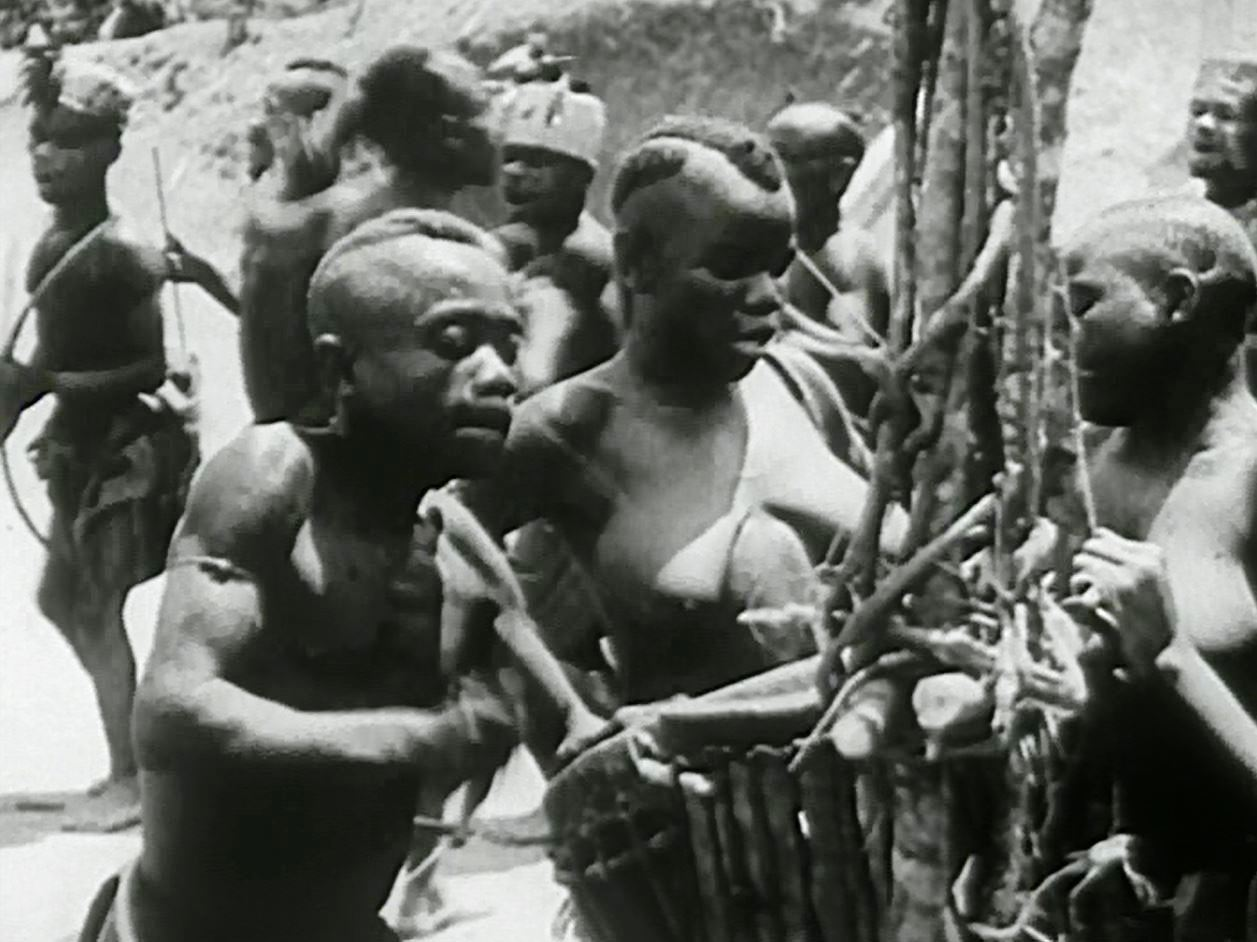
Pygmy music is thought to be the first expression of polyphony in world music, being recorded at least 200 years before the concept emerged in Europe.

Culture is considered a central concept in anthropology, encompassing the range of phenomena that are transmitted through social learning in human societies. Cultural universals are found in all human societies. These include expressive forms like art, music, dance, ritual, religion, and technologies like tool usage, cooking, shelter, and clothing. The concept of material culture covers the physical expressions of culture, such as technology, architecture and art, whereas the immaterial aspects of culture such as principles of social organization (including practices of political organization and social institutions), mythology, philosophy, literature (both written and oral), and science comprise the intangible cultural heritage of a society.

In the humanities, one sense of culture as an attribute of the individual has been the degree to which they have cultivated a particular level of sophistication in the arts, sciences, education, or manners. The level of cultural sophistication has also sometimes been used to distinguish civilizations from less complex societies. Such hierarchical perspectives on culture are also found in class-based distinctions between a high culture of the social elite and a low culture, popular culture, or folk culture of the lower classes, distinguished by stratified access to cultural capital.

In common parlance, culture is often used to refer specifically to the symbolic markers used by ethnic groups to distinguish themselves visibly from each other, such as body modification, clothing or adornment. Mass culture refers to the mass-produced and mass-mediated forms of consumer culture that emerged in the 20th century. Some schools of philosophy, such as Marxism and critical theory, have argued that culture is often used politically as a tool of the elites to manipulate the proletariat and create a false consciousness. Such perspectives are common in the discipline of cultural studies. In the wider social sciences, the theoretical perspective of cultural materialism holds that human symbolic culture arises from the material conditions of human life, and that the basis of culture is found in evolved biological dispositions.

When used as a count noun, a "culture" is the set of customs, traditions, and values of a society or community, such as an ethnic group or nation, and the knowledge acquired over time. In this sense, multiculturalism values the peaceful coexistence and mutual respect between different cultures inhabiting the same planet. Sometimes "culture" is also used to describe specific practices within a subgroup of a society, a subculture (e.g., "bro culture"), or a counterculture. Within cultural anthropology, the ideology and analytical stance of cultural relativism hold that cultures cannot easily be objectively ranked or evaluated because any evaluation is necessarily situated within the value system of a given culture.

== Etymology ==
The modern term culture is based on a term used by the ancient Roman orator Cicero in his Tusculanae Disputationes, where he wrote of a cultivation of the soul or cultura animi, using an agricultural metaphor for the development of a philosophical soul, understood teleologically as the highest possible ideal for human development. Samuel von Pufendorf took over this metaphor in a modern context, meaning something similar, but no longer assuming philosophy was humanity's natural perfection. This use, and that of many writers, "refers to all the ways in which human beings overcome their original barbarism, and through artifice, become fully human".

Edward S. Casey wrote, "The very word culture meant 'place tilled' in Middle English, and the same word goes back to Latin colere, 'to inhabit, care for, till, worship' and cultus, 'A cult, especially a religious one.' To be cultural, to have a culture, is to inhabit a place sufficiently intensely to cultivate it—to be responsible for it, to respond to it, to attend to it caringly."

Culture, as described by Richard Velkley:

... originally meant the cultivation of the soul or mind, acquires most of its later modern meaning in the writings of the 18th-century German thinkers, who were on various levels developing Rousseau's criticism of "modern liberalism and Enlightenment". Thus a contrast between "culture" and "civilization" is usually implied in these authors, even when not expressed as such.

In the words of anthropologist E. B. Tylor, it is "that complex whole which includes knowledge, belief, art, morals, law, custom and any other capabilities and habits acquired by man as a member of society". Alternatively, in a contemporary variant, "Culture is defined as a social domain that emphasizes the practices, discourses and material expressions, which, over time, express the continuities and discontinuities of social meaning of a life held in common.

The Cambridge English Dictionary states that culture is "the way of life, especially the general customs and beliefs, of a particular group of people at a particular time." Terror management theory posits that culture is a series of activities and worldviews that provide humans with the basis for perceiving themselves as "person[s] of worth within the world of meaning"—raising themselves above the merely physical aspects of existence, in order to deny the animal insignificance and death that Homo sapiens became aware of when they acquired a larger brain.

The word is used in a general sense as the evolved ability to categorize and represent experiences with symbols, and to act imaginatively and creatively. This ability arose with the evolution of behavioral modernity in humans around 50,000 years ago and is often thought to be unique to humans. However, some other species have demonstrated similar, though less complicated, abilities for social learning. It is also used to denote the complex networks of practices and accumulated knowledge and ideas that are transmitted through social interaction and exist in specific human groups, or cultures, using the plural form.

== Change ==
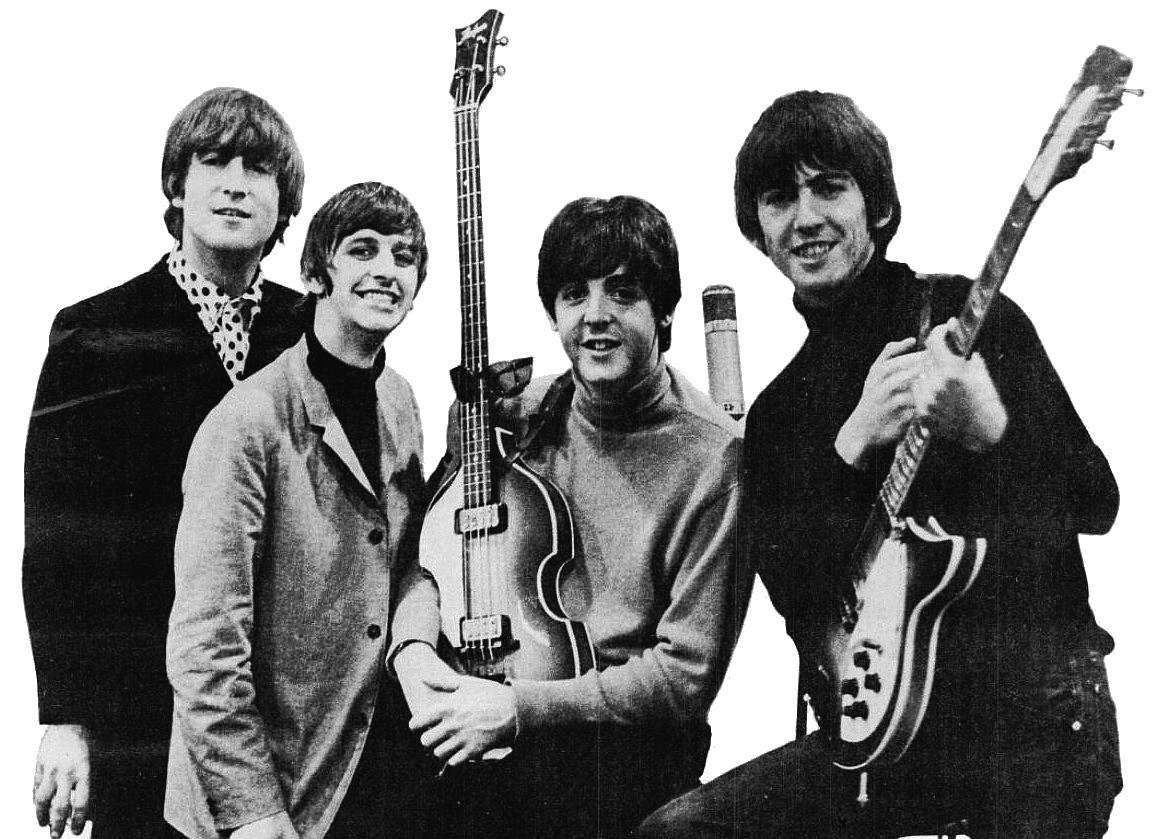
The Beatles exemplified changing cultural dynamics, not only in music, but fashion and lifestyle. Six decades after their emergence, they continue to have a worldwide cultural impact.

Raimon Panikkar identified 29 ways in which cultural change can be brought about, including growth, development, evolution, involution, renovation, reconception, reform, innovation, revivalism, revolution, mutation, progress, diffusion, osmosis, borrowing, eclecticism, syncretism, modernization, indigenization, and transformation. In this context, modernization could be viewed as adopting Enlightenment-era beliefs and practices, such as science, rationalism, industry, commerce, democracy, and the notion of progress. Rein Raud, building on the work of Umberto Eco, Pierre Bourdieu and Jeffrey C. Alexander, has proposed a model of cultural change based on claims and bids, which are judged by their cognitive adequacy and endorsed or not endorsed by the symbolic authority of the cultural community in question.

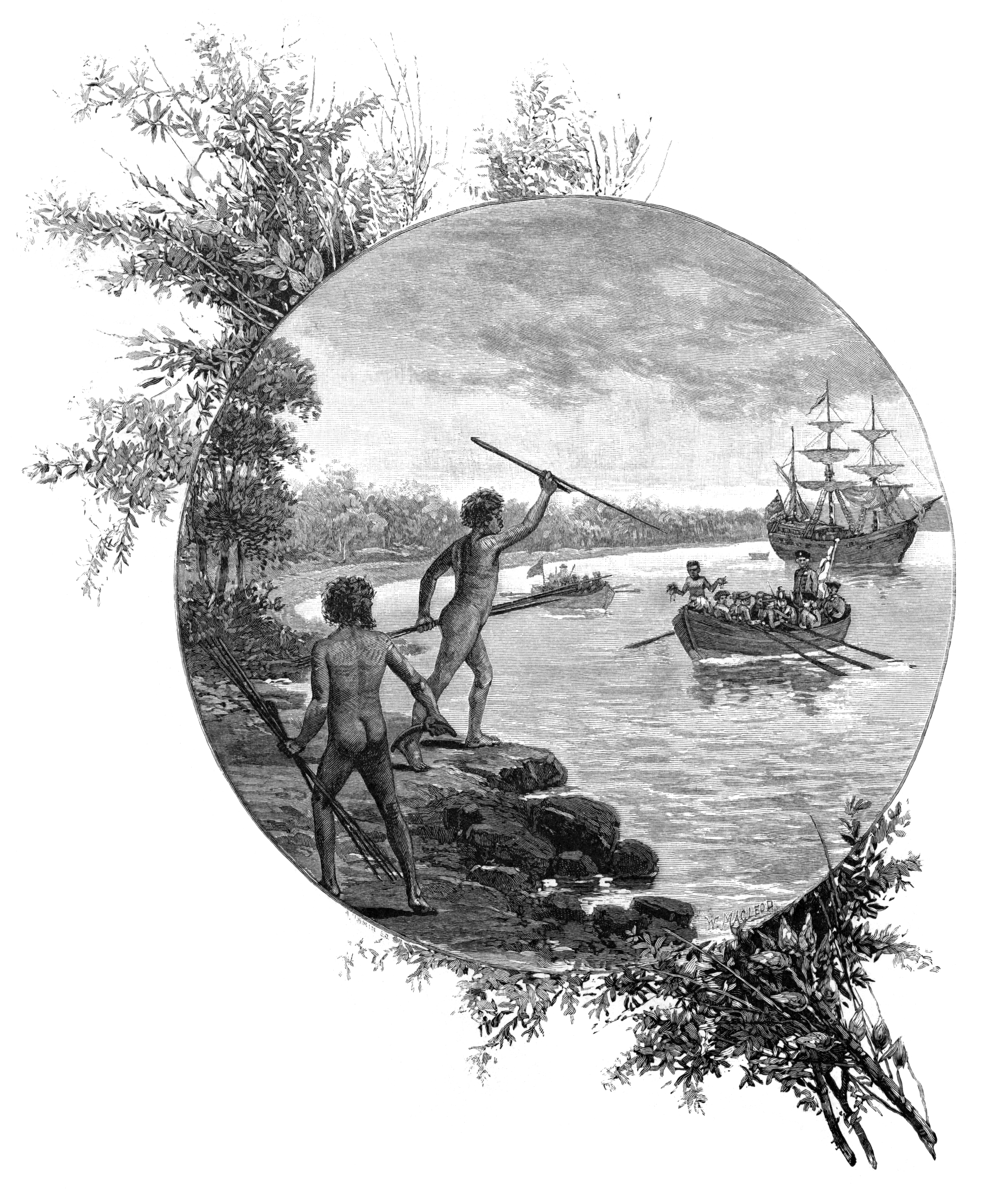
19th-century engraving shows Indigenous Australians opposing the arrival of James Cook in 1770

Cultural invention has come to mean any innovation that is new and found to be useful to a group of people and expressed in their behavior, but which does not exist as a physical object. Humanity is in a global "accelerating culture change period," driven by the expansion of international commerce, the mass media, and above all, the human population explosion, among other factors. Culture repositioning means the reconstruction of the cultural concept of a society.

Cultures are internally affected by both forces encouraging change and forces resisting change. These forces are related to both social structures and natural events and are involved in perpetuating cultural ideas and practices within current structures, which themselves are subject to change.

Social conflict and the development of technologies can produce changes within a society by altering social dynamics and promoting new cultural models and spurring or enabling generative action. These social shifts may accompany ideological shifts and other types of cultural change. For example, the feminist movement involved new practices that produced a shift in gender relations, altering both gender and economic structures. Environmental conditions may also enter as factors. For example, after tropical forests returned at the end of the last ice age, plants suitable for domestication were available, leading to the invention of agriculture, which in turn brought about many cultural innovations and shifts in social dynamics.

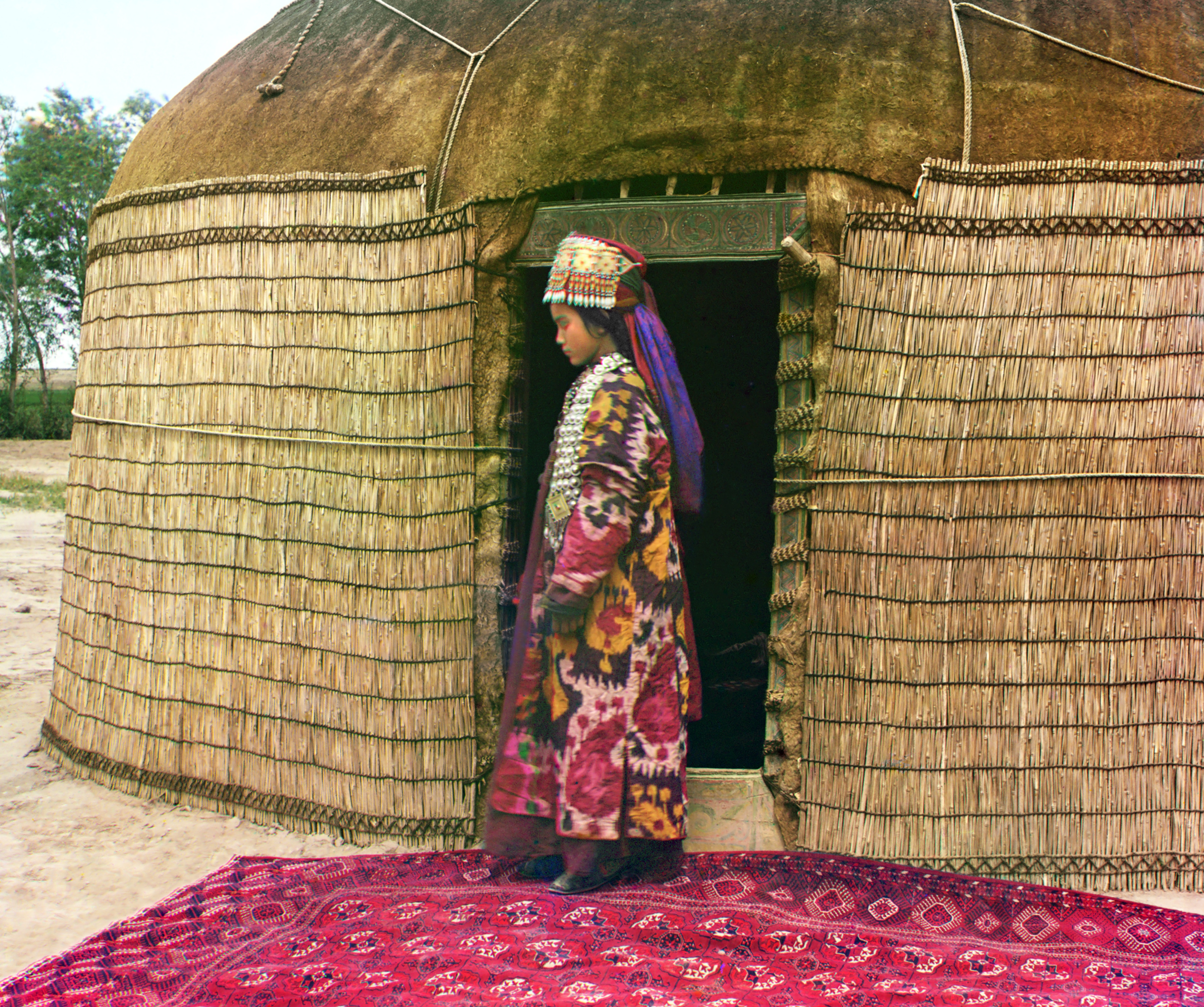
Turkmen woman, on a carpet at the entrance to a yurt, in traditional clothing. Sense of time is dependent on culture. This is a 1913 photo, but it can be difficult to date for a viewer, due to the absence of cultural cues.

Cultures are externally affected via contact between societies, which may also produce—or inhibit—social shifts and changes in cultural practices. War or competition over resources may impact technological development or social dynamics. Additionally, cultural ideas may transfer from one society to another, through diffusion or acculturation. In diffusion, the form of something (though not necessarily its meaning) moves from one culture to another. For example, Western restaurant chains and culinary brands sparked curiosity and fascination to the Chinese as China opened its economy to international trade in the late 20th-century. "Stimulus diffusion" (the sharing of ideas) refers to an element of one culture leading to an invention or propagation in another. "Direct borrowing", on the other hand, tends to refer to technological or tangible diffusion from one culture to another. Diffusion of innovations theory presents a research-based model of why and when individuals and cultures adopt new ideas, practices, and products.

Acculturation has multiple meanings; in this context, it refers to the replacement of traits of one culture with another, such as what happened to certain Native American tribes and many indigenous peoples across the globe during colonization. Related processes on an individual level include assimilation and transculturation. The transnational flow of culture has played a major role in merging different cultures and sharing thoughts, ideas, and beliefs.

== Early modern discourses ==
=== German Romanticism ===
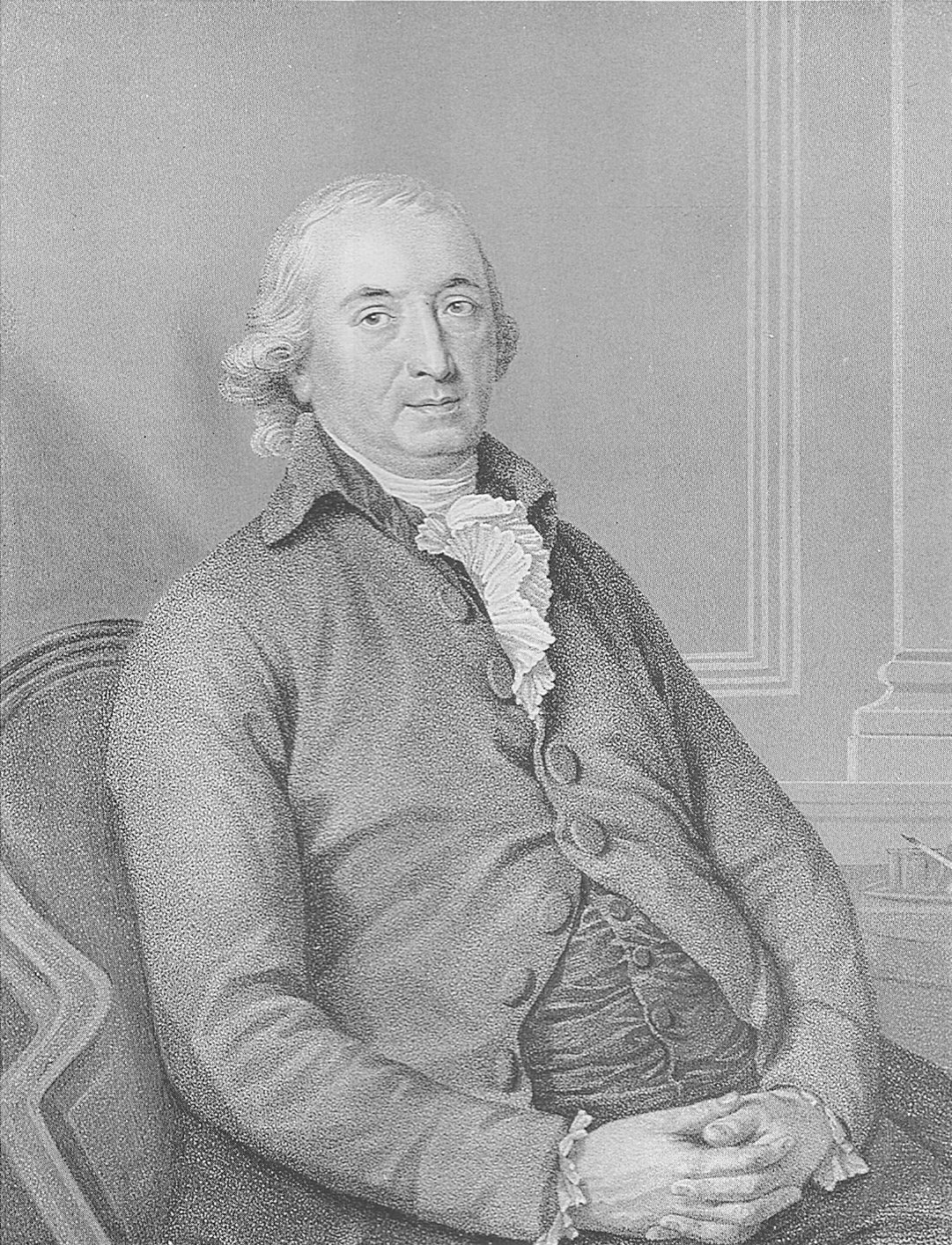
Johann Herder called attention to national cultures.

Immanuel Kant (1724–1804) formulated an individualist definition of "enlightenment" similar to the concept of bildung: "Enlightenment is man's emergence from his self-incurred immaturity." He argued that this immaturity comes not from a lack of understanding, but from a lack of courage to think independently. Against this intellectual cowardice, Kant urged: "Sapere Aude" ("Dare to be wise!"). In reaction to Kant, German scholars such as Johann Gottfried Herder (1744–1803) argued that human creativity, which necessarily takes unpredictable and highly diverse forms, is as important as human rationality. Moreover, Herder proposed a collective form of Bildung: "For Herder, Bildung was the totality of experiences that provide a coherent identity, and sense of common destiny, to a people."

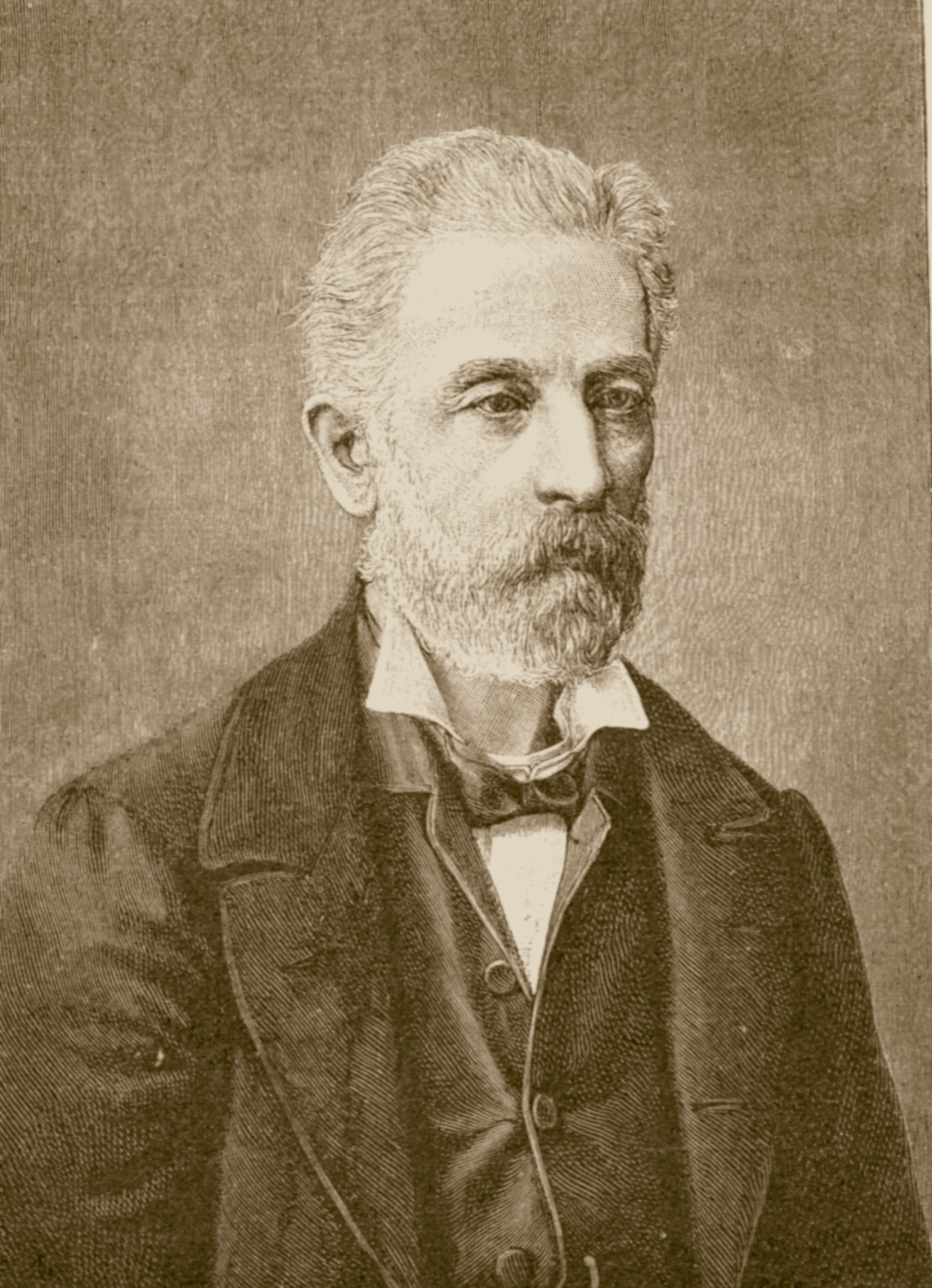
Adolf Bastian developed a universal model of culture.

In 1795, the Prussian linguist and philosopher Wilhelm von Humboldt (1767–1835) called for an anthropology that would synthesize Kant's and Herder's interests. During the Romantic era, scholars in Germany, especially those concerned with nationalist movements—such as the nationalist struggle to create a "Germany" out of diverse principalities, and the nationalist struggles by ethnic minorities against the Austro-Hungarian Empire—developed a more inclusive notion of culture as "worldview" (Weltanschauung). According to this school of thought, each ethnic group has a distinct worldview that is incommensurable with the worldviews of other groups. Although more inclusive than earlier views, this approach to culture still allowed for distinctions between "civilized" and "primitive" or "tribal" cultures.

In 1860, Adolf Bastian (1826–1905) argued for "the psychic unity of mankind". He proposed that a scientific comparison of all human societies would reveal that distinct worldviews consisted of the same basic elements. According to Bastian, all human societies share a set of "elementary ideas" (Elementargedanken); different cultures, or different "folk ideas" (Völkergedanken), are local modifications of the elementary ideas. This view paved the way for the modern understanding of culture. Franz Boas (1858–1942) was trained in this tradition, and he brought it with him when he left Germany for the United States.

=== English Romanticism ===
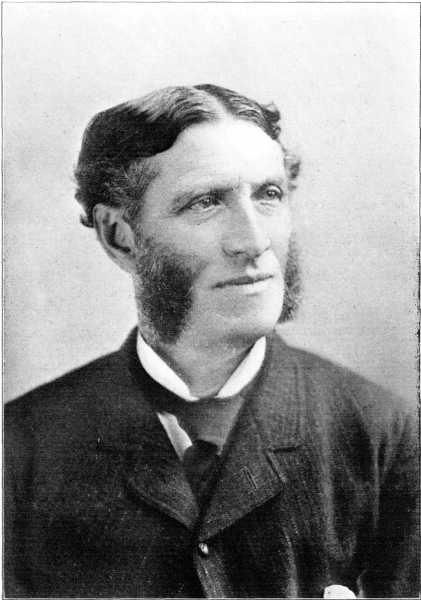
British poet and critic Matthew Arnold viewed "culture" as the cultivation of the humanist ideal.

In the 19th century, humanists such as English poet and essayist Matthew Arnold (1822–1888) used the word "culture" to refer to an ideal of individual human refinement, of "the best that has been thought and said in the world". This concept of culture is also comparable to the German concept of bildung: "...culture being a pursuit of our total perfection by means of getting to know, on all the matters which most concern us, the best which has been thought and said in the world".

In practice, culture referred to an elite ideal and was associated with such activities as art, classical music, and haute cuisine. As these forms were associated with urban life, "culture" was identified with "civilization" (from Latin: civitas, lit. 'city'). Another facet of the Romantic movement was an interest in folklore, which led to identifying a "culture" among non-elites. This distinction is often characterized as that between high culture, namely that of the ruling class, and low culture. In other words, the idea of "culture" that developed in Europe during the 18th and early 19th centuries reflected inequalities within European societies.

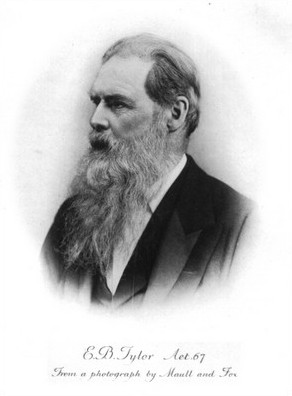
British anthropologist Edward Tylor was one of the first English-speaking scholars to use the term culture in an inclusive and universal sense.

Matthew Arnold contrasted "culture" with anarchy; other Europeans, following philosophers Thomas Hobbes and Jean-Jacques Rousseau, contrasted "culture" with "the state of nature". According to Hobbes and Rousseau, the Native Americans who were being conquered by Europeans from the 16th centuries on were living in a state of nature; this opposition was expressed through the contrast between "civilized" and "uncivilized". According to this way of thinking, one could classify some countries and nations as more civilized than others and some people as more cultured than others. This contrast led to Herbert Spencer's theory of Social Darwinism and Lewis Henry Morgan's theory of cultural evolution. Just as some critics have argued that the distinction between high and low cultures expresses the conflict between European elites and non-elites, other critics have argued that the distinction between civilized and uncivilized people is an expression of the conflict between European colonial powers and their colonial subjects.

Other 19th-century critics, following Rousseau, have accepted this differentiation between higher and lower culture, but have seen the refinement and sophistication of high culture as corrupting and unnatural developments that obscure and distort people's essential nature. These critics considered folk music (as produced by "the folk," i.e., rural, illiterate, peasants) to honestly express a natural way of life, while classical music seemed superficial and decadent. Equally, this view often portrayed indigenous peoples as "noble savages" living authentic and unblemished lives, uncomplicated and uncorrupted by the highly stratified capitalist systems of Western culture.

In 1870 the anthropologist Edward Tylor (1832–1917) applied these ideas of higher versus lower culture to propose a theory of the evolution of religion. According to this theory, religion evolves from more polytheistic to more monotheistic forms. In the process, he redefined culture as a diverse set of activities characteristic of all human societies. This view paved the way for the modern understanding of religion.

== Anthropology ==
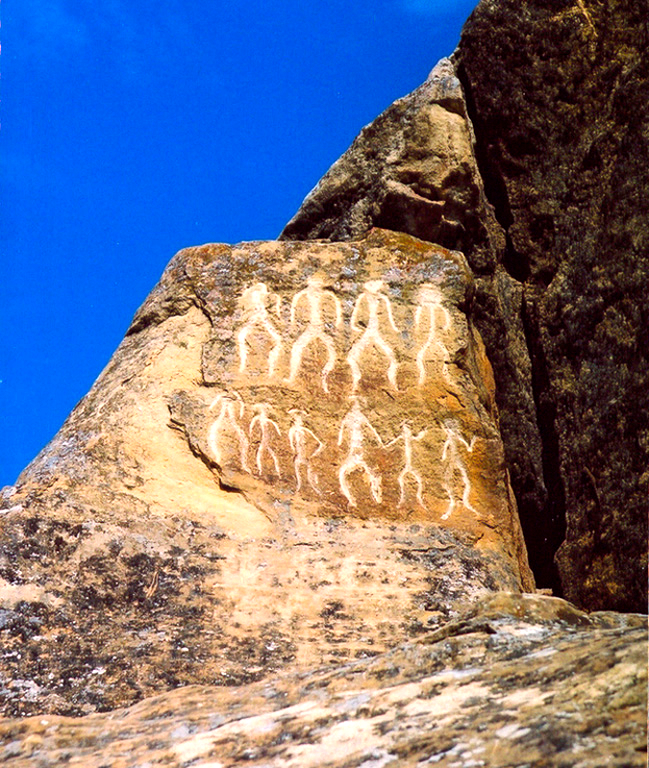
Petroglyphs in modern-day Gobustan, Azerbaijan, dating to 10,000 BCE and indicating a thriving culture

Although anthropologists worldwide refer to Tylor's definition of culture, in the 20th century "culture" emerged as the central and unifying concept of American anthropology, where it most commonly refers to the universal human capacity to classify and encode human experiences symbolically, and to communicate symbolically encoded experiences socially. American anthropology is organized into four fields, each of which plays an important role in research on culture: biological anthropology, linguistic anthropology, cultural anthropology, and in the United States and Canada, archaeology. The term Kulturbrille, or 'culture glasses', coined by German American anthropologist Franz Boas, refers to the "lenses" through which a person sees their own culture. Martin Lindstrom asserts that Kulturbrille, which allow a person to make sense of the culture they inhabit, "can blind us to things outsiders pick up immediately".

== Sociology ==
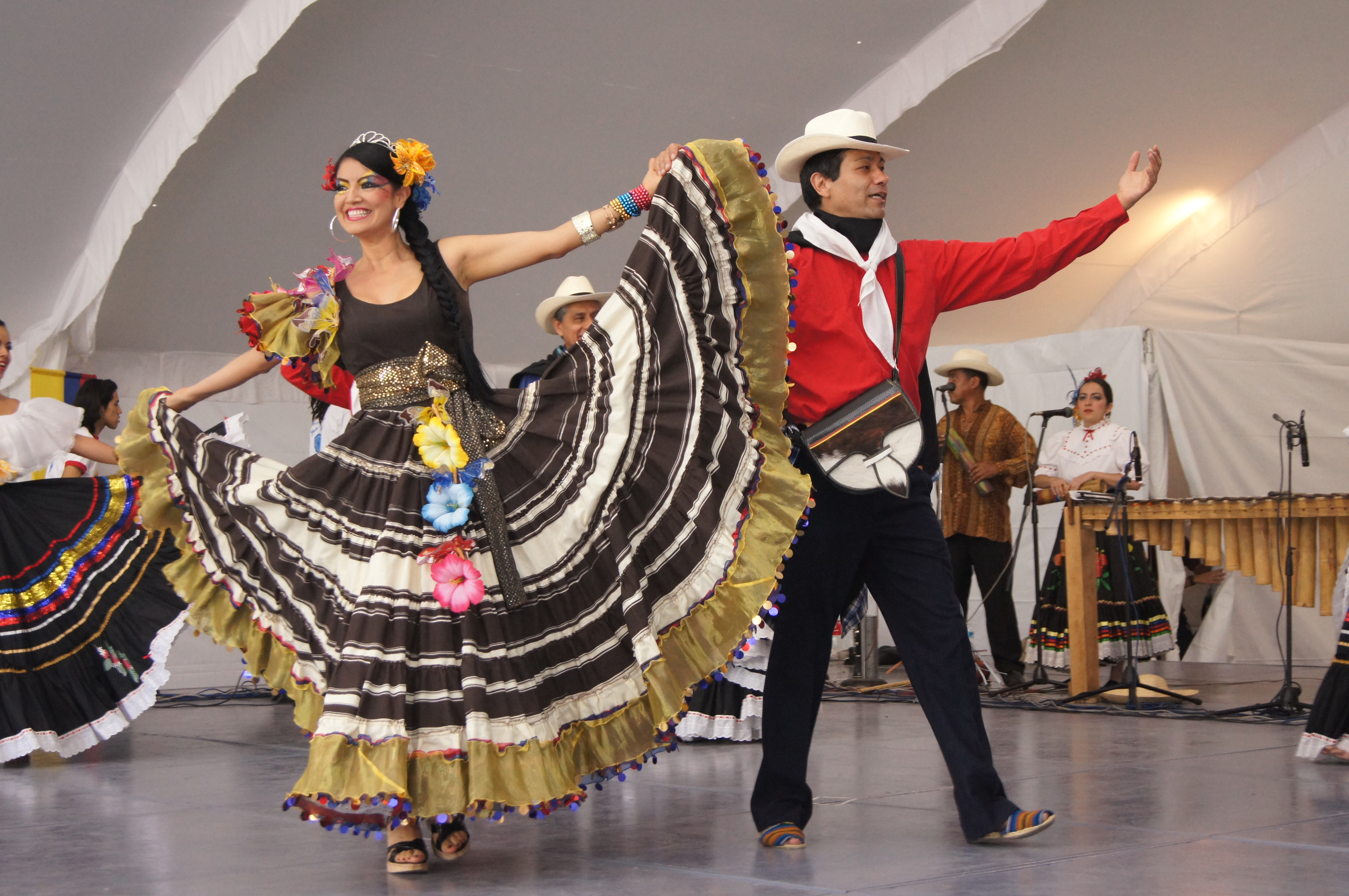
An example of folkloric dancing in Colombia

The sociology of culture concerns culture as manifested in society. For sociologist Georg Simmel (1858–1918), culture referred to "the cultivation of individuals through the agency of external forms which have been objectified in the course of history". As such, culture in the sociological field can be defined as the ways of thinking, the ways of acting, and the material objects that together shape a people's way of life. Culture can be either of two types, non-material culture or material culture. Non-material culture refers to the non-physical ideas that individuals have about their culture, including values, belief systems, rules, norms, morals, language, organizations, and institutions, while material culture is the physical evidence of a culture in the objects and architecture they make or have made. The term tends to be relevant only in archeological and anthropological studies, but it specifically means all material evidence which can be attributed to culture, past or present.

Cultural sociology first emerged in Weimar Germany (1918–1933), where sociologists such as Alfred Weber used the term Kultursoziologie ('cultural sociology'). Cultural sociology was then reinvented in the English-speaking world as a product of the cultural turn of the 1960s, which ushered in structuralist and postmodern approaches to social science. This type of cultural sociology may be loosely regarded as an approach incorporating cultural analysis and critical theory. Cultural sociologists tend to reject scientific methods, instead hermeneutically focusing on words, artifacts and symbols. Culture has since become an important concept across many branches of sociology, including resolutely scientific fields like social stratification and social network analysis. As a result, there has been a recent influx of quantitative sociologists to the field. Thus, there is now a growing group of sociologists of culture who are, confusingly, not cultural sociologists. These scholars reject the abstracted postmodern aspects of cultural sociology, and instead, look for a theoretical backing in the more scientific vein of social psychology and cognitive science.

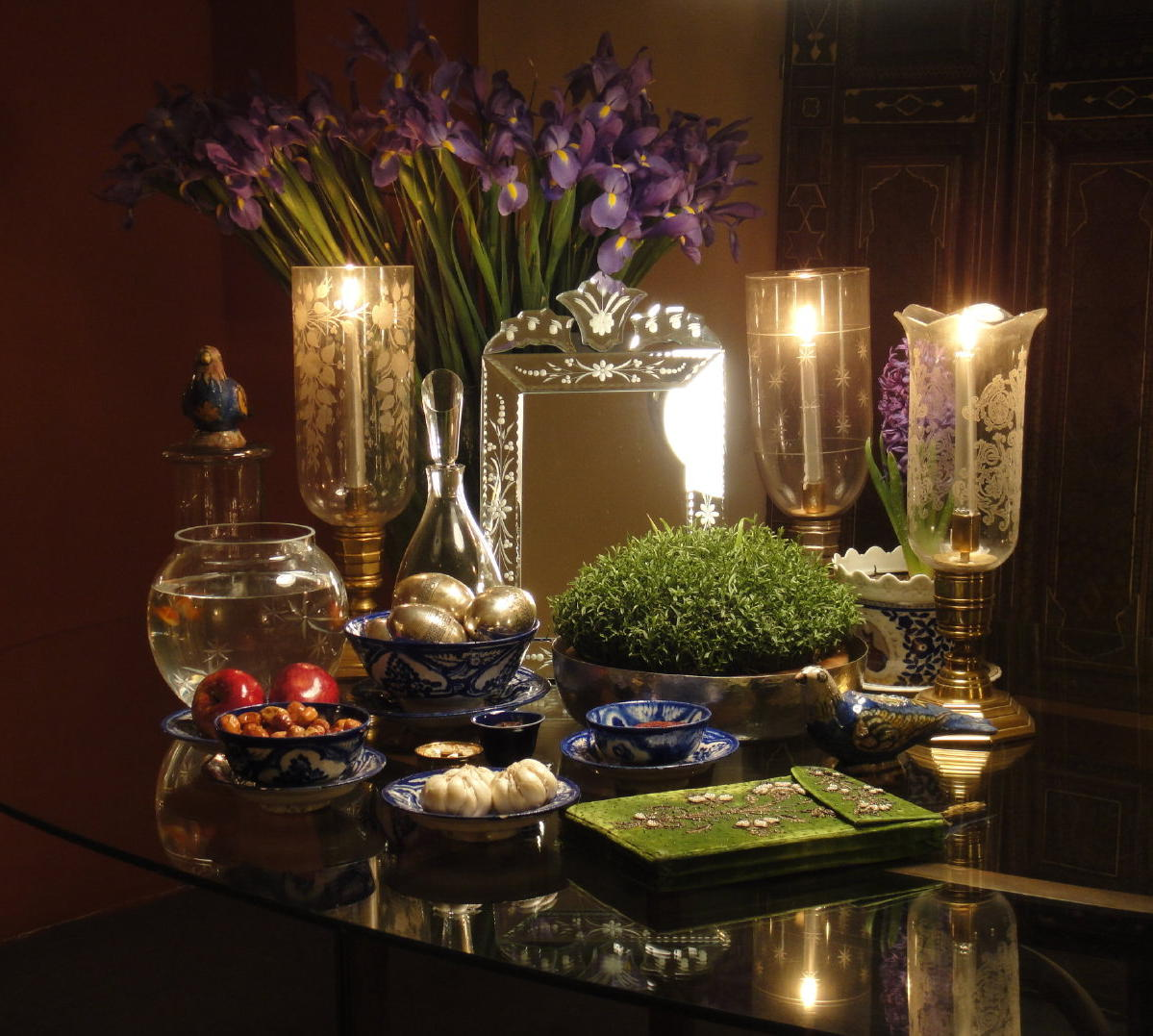
Nowruz is a good sample of popular and folklore culture that is celebrated by people in more than 22 countries with different nations and religions, at the 1st day of spring. It has been celebrated by diverse communities for over 7,000 years.

=== Early researchers and development of cultural sociology ===
The sociology of culture grew from the intersection between sociology (as shaped by early theorists like Marx, Durkheim, and Weber) with the growing discipline of anthropology, wherein researchers pioneered ethnographic strategies for describing and analyzing a variety of cultures around the world. Part of the legacy of the early development of the field lingers in the methods (much of cultural, sociological research is qualitative), in the theories (a variety of critical approaches to sociology are central to current research communities), and in the substantive focus of the field. For instance, relationships between popular culture, political control, and social class were early and lasting concerns in the field.

== Cultural studies ==
In the United Kingdom, sociologists and other scholars influenced by Marxism such as Stuart Hall (1932–2014) and Raymond Williams (1921–88) developed cultural studies. Following nineteenth-century Romantics, they identified culture with consumption goods and leisure activities (such as art, music, film, food, sports, and clothing). They saw patterns of consumption and leisure as determined by relations of production, which led them to focus on class relations and the organization of production.

In the UK, cultural studies focuses largely on the study of popular culture; that is, on the social meanings of mass-produced consumer and leisure goods. Richard Hoggart coined the term in 1964 when he founded the Centre for Contemporary Cultural Studies or CCCS. Cultural studies in this sense, then, can be viewed as a limited concentration scoped on the intricacies of consumerism, which belongs to a wider culture sometimes referred to as Western civilization or globalism.

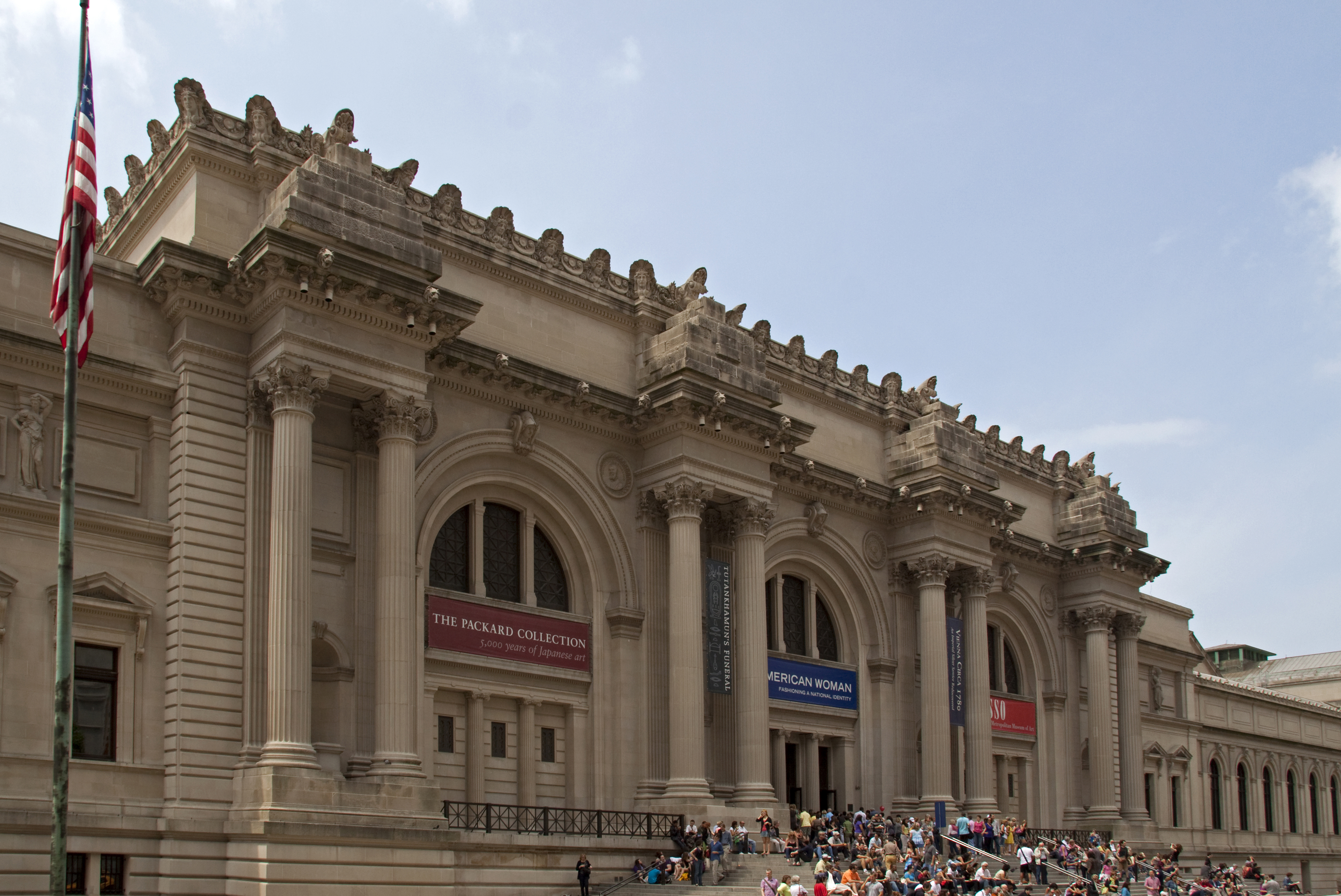
The Metropolitan Museum of Art in Manhattan. Visual art can be one expression of high culture.

From the 1970s onward, Stuart Hall's pioneering work, along with that of his colleagues Paul Willis, Dick Hebdige, Tony Jefferson, and Angela McRobbie, created an international intellectual movement. As the field developed, it began to combine political economy, communication, sociology, social theory, literary theory, media theory, film/video studies, cultural anthropology, philosophy, museum studies, and art history to study cultural phenomena or cultural texts. In this field researchers often concentrate on how particular phenomena relate to matters of ideology, nationality, ethnicity, social class, or gender.

Cultural studies is concerned with the meaning and practices of everyday life. These practices comprise the ways people do particular things (such as watching television or eating out) in a given culture. It also studies the meanings and uses people attribute to various objects and practices. Specifically, culture involves those meanings and practices held independently of reason. Watching television to view a public perspective on a historical event should not be thought of as culture unless referring to the medium of television itself, which may have been selected culturally; however, schoolchildren watching television after school with their friends to "fit in" certainly qualifies since there is no grounded reason for one's participation in this practice.

In the context of cultural studies, a text includes not only written language, but also films, photographs, fashion, or hairstyles: the texts of cultural studies comprise all the meaningful artifacts of culture. Similarly, the discipline widens the concept of culture. Culture, for a cultural-studies researcher, not only includes traditional high culture (the culture of the ruling social groups) and popular culture, but also everyday meanings and practices. The last two, in fact, have become the main focus of cultural studies. A further and recent approach is comparative cultural studies, based on the disciplines of comparative literature and cultural studies.

Scholars in the UK and the US developed different versions of cultural studies after the 1970s. The British version of cultural studies had originated in the 1950s and 60s, mainly under the influence of Richard Hoggart, E. P. Thompson, and Raymond Williams, and later that of Stuart Hall and others at the Centre for Contemporary Cultural Studies. This included overtly political, left-wing views, and criticisms of popular culture as "capitalist" mass culture; it absorbed some of the ideas of the Frankfurt School critique of the "culture industry" i.e. mass culture. This emerges in the writings of early British cultural-studies scholars and their influences: see the work of Raymond Williams, Stuart Hall, Paul Willis, and Paul Gilroy.

In the United States, Lindlof and Taylor write, "cultural studies [were] grounded in a pragmatic, liberal-pluralist tradition." The American version of cultural studies initially concerned itself more with understanding the subjective and appropriative side of audience reactions to, and uses of, mass culture; for example, American cultural-studies advocates wrote about the liberatory aspects of fandom.

Some researchers, especially in early British cultural studies, apply a Marxist model to the field. This strain of thinking has some influence from the Frankfurt School, but especially from the structuralist Marxism of Louis Althusser and others. The main focus of an orthodox Marxist approach concentrates on the production of meaning. This model assumes a mass production of culture and identifies power as residing with those producing cultural artifacts.

In a Marxist view, the mode and relations of production form the economic base of society, which constantly interacts and influences superstructures, such as culture. Other approaches to cultural studies, such as feminist cultural studies and later American developments of the field, distance themselves from this view. They criticize the Marxist assumption of a single, dominant meaning, shared by all, for any cultural product. The non-Marxist approaches suggest that different ways of consuming cultural artifacts affect the meaning of the product.

This view comes through in the book Doing Cultural Studies: The Story of the Sony Walkman (by Paul du Gay et al.), which seeks to challenge the notion that those who produce commodities control the meanings that people attribute to them. Feminist cultural analyst, theorist, and art historian Griselda Pollock contributed to cultural studies from viewpoints of art history and psychoanalysis. The writer Julia Kristeva is among influential voices at the turn of the century, contributing to cultural studies from the field of art and psychoanalytical French feminism.

Petrakis and Kostis (2013) divide cultural background variables into two main groups:

1. The first group covers the variables that represent the "efficiency orientation" of the societies: performance orientation, future orientation, assertiveness, power distance, and uncertainty avoidance.
2. The second covers the variables that represent the "social orientation" of societies, i.e., the attitudes and lifestyles of their members. These variables include gender egalitarianism, institutional collectivism, in-group collectivism, and human orientation.

In 2016, a new approach to culture was suggested by Rein Raud, who defines culture as the sum of resources available to human beings for making sense of their world and proposes a two-tiered approach, combining the study of texts (all reified meanings in circulation) and cultural practices (all repeatable actions that involve the production, dissemination or transmission of purposes), thus making it possible to re-link anthropological and sociological study of culture with the tradition of textual theory.

== Psychology ==
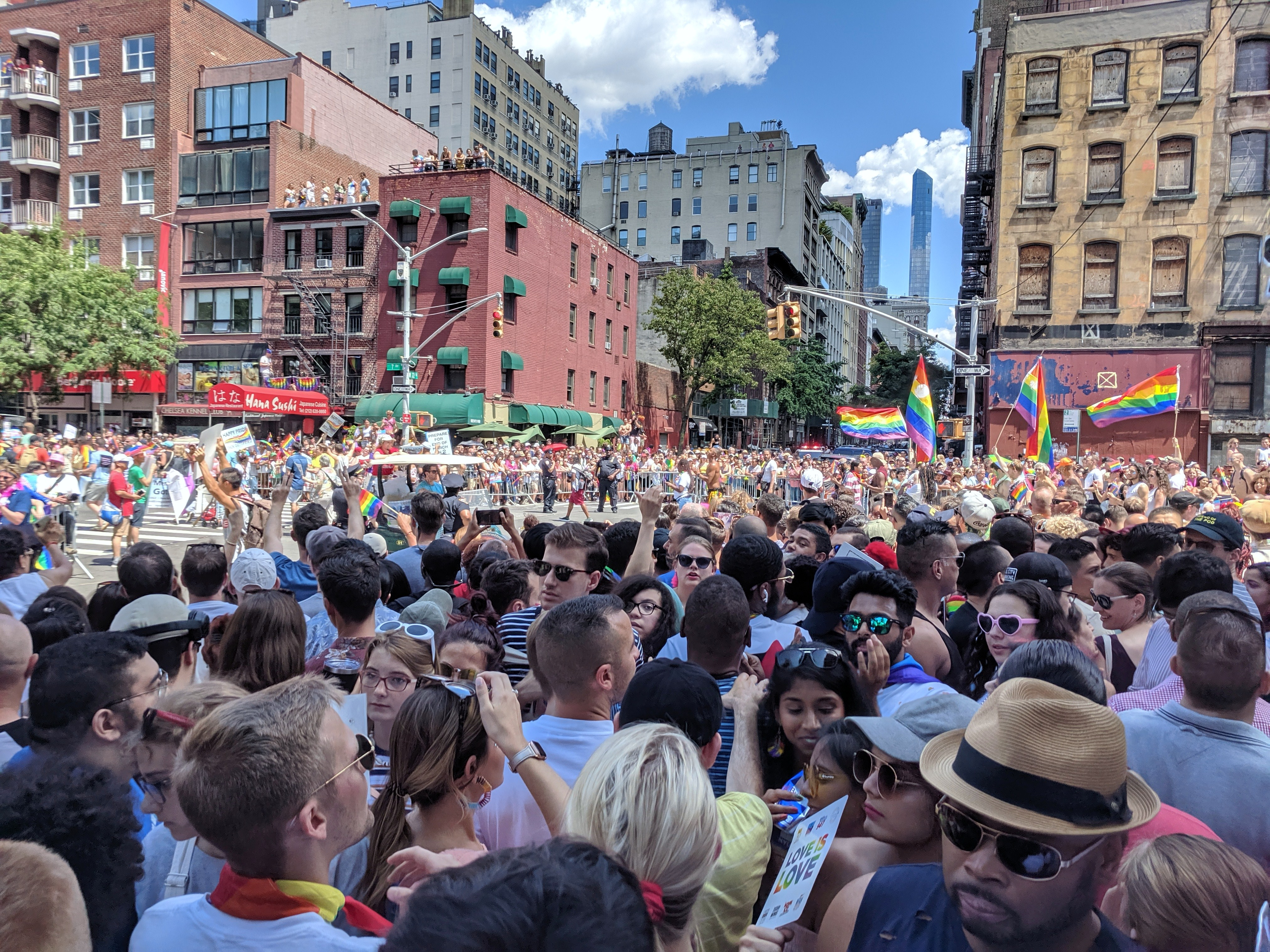
The NYC Pride March is the world's largest LGBT event. Regional variation exists with respect to tolerance in different parts of the world.

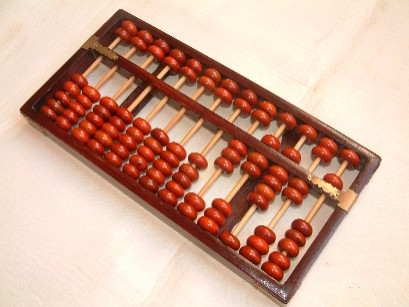
Cognitive tools suggest a way for people from certain culture to deal with real-life problems, like Suanpan for mathematical calculation.

Starting in the 1990s, psychological research on culture influence began to grow and challenge the universality assumed in general psychology. Culture psychologists began to try to explore the relationship between emotions and culture, and answer whether the human mind is independent from culture. For example, people from collectivistic cultures, such as the Japanese, suppress their positive emotions more than their American counterparts. Culture may affect the way that people experience and express emotions. On the other hand, some researchers try to look for differences between people's personalities across cultures. As different cultures dictate distinctive norms, culture shock is also studied to understand how people react when they are confronted with other cultures. LGBT culture is displayed with significantly different levels of tolerance within different cultures and nations. Cognitive tools may not be accessible or they may function differently cross culture. For example, people who are raised in a culture with an abacus are trained with distinctive reasoning style. Cultural lenses may also make people view the same outcome of events differently. Westerners are more motivated by their successes than their failures, while East Asians are better motivated by the avoidance of failure.

Culture is important for psychologists to consider when understanding the human mental operation. The notion of the anxious, unstable, and rebellious adolescent has been criticized by experts, such as Robert Epstein, who state that an undeveloped brain is not the main cause of teenagers' turmoils. Some have criticized this understanding of adolescence, classifying it as a relatively recent phenomenon in human history created by modern society, and have been highly critical of what they view as the infantilization of young adults in American society. According to Robert Epstein and Jennifer, "American-style teen turmoil is absent in more than 100 cultures around the world, suggesting that such mayhem is not biologically inevitable. Second, the brain itself changes in response to experiences, raising the question of whether adolescent brain characteristics are the cause of teen tumult or rather the result of lifestyle and experiences." David Moshman has also stated in regards to adolescence that brain research "is crucial for a full picture, but it does not provide an ultimate explanation".

== Protection of culture ==
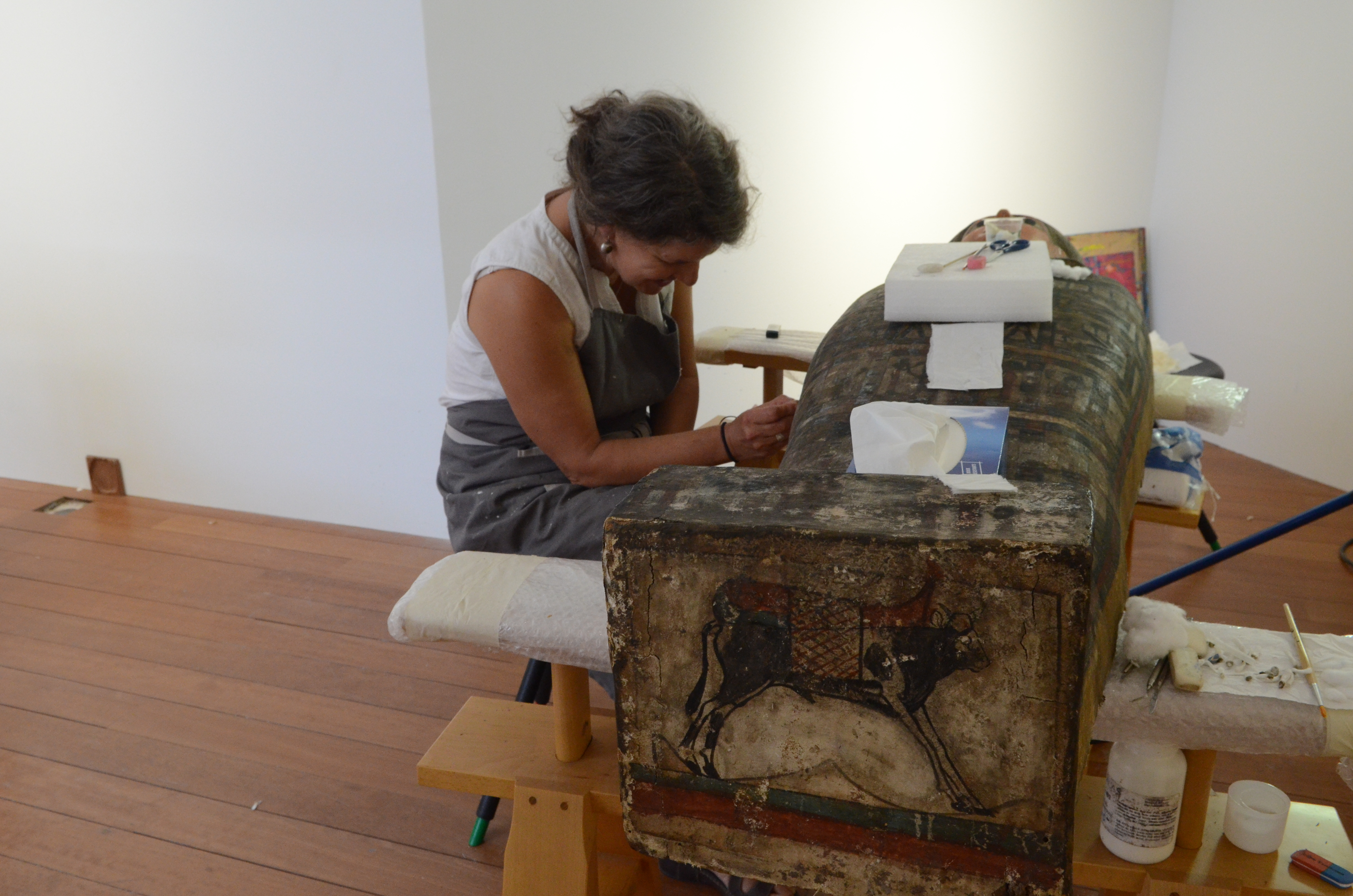
Restoration of an ancient Egyptian monument

There are a number of international agreements and national laws relating to the protection of cultural heritage and cultural diversity. UNESCO and its partner organizations such as Blue Shield International coordinate international protection and local implementation. The Hague Convention for the Protection of Cultural Property in the Event of Armed Conflict and the UNESCO Convention on the Protection and Promotion of the Diversity of Cultural Expressions deal with the protection of culture. Article 27 of the Universal Declaration of Human Rights deals with cultural heritage in two ways: it gives people the right to participate in cultural life on the one hand and the right to the protection of their contributions to cultural life on the other.

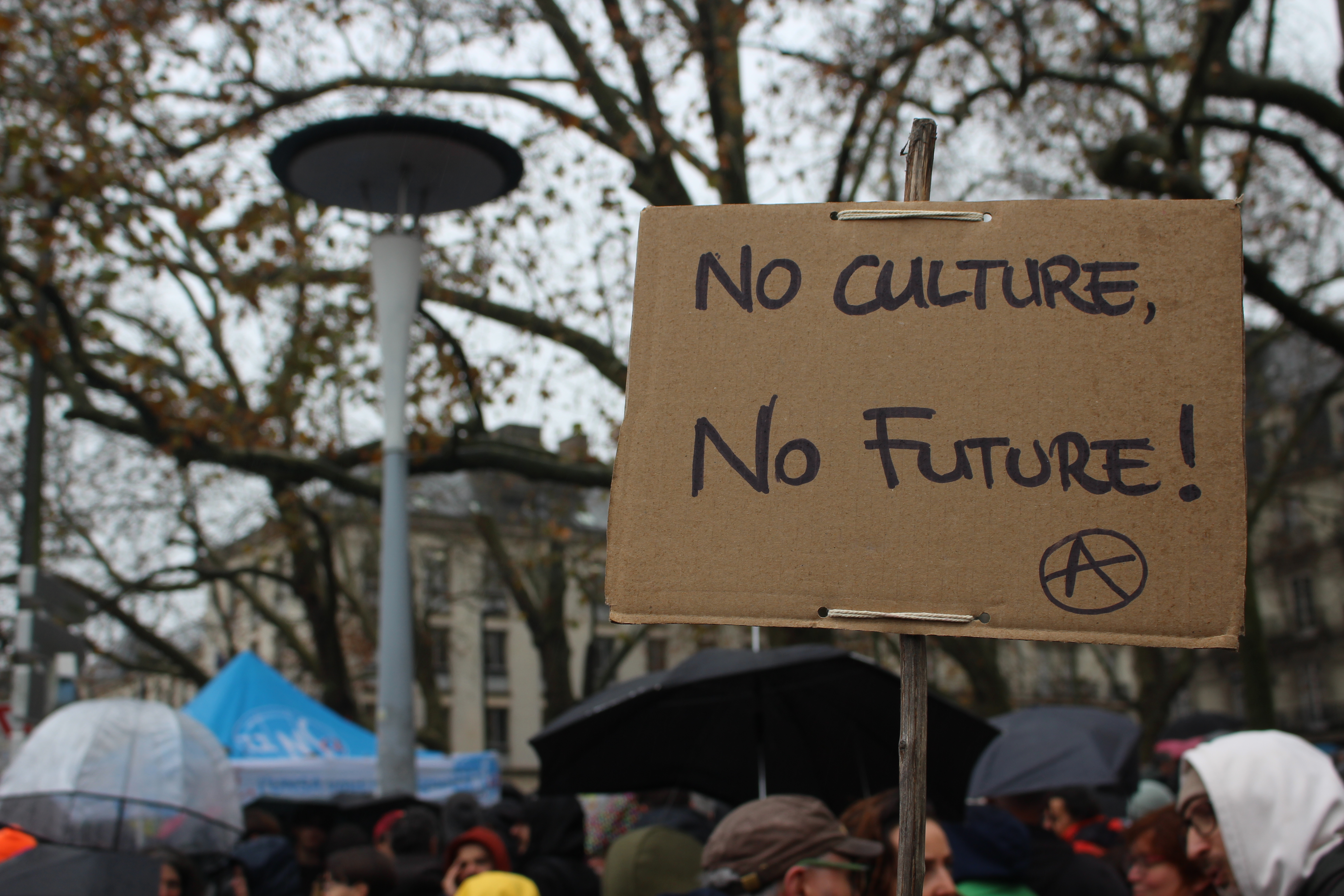
Anarchist poster reading "No Culture, No Future!", 5 December 2024

In the 21st century, the protection of culture has been the focus of increasing activity by national and international organizations. The United Nations and UNESCO promote cultural preservation and cultural diversity through declarations and legally-binding conventions or treaties. The aim is not to protect a person's property, but rather to preserve the cultural heritage of humanity, especially in the event of war and armed conflict. According to Karl von Habsburg, President of Blue Shield International, the destruction of cultural assets is also part of psychological warfare. The target of the attack is the identity of the opponent, which is why symbolic cultural assets become a main target. It is also intended to affect the particularly sensitive cultural memory, the growing cultural diversity and the economic basis (such as tourism) of a state, region or municipality.

Tourism is having an increasing impact on the various forms of culture. On the one hand, this can be physical impact on individual objects or the destruction caused by increasing environmental pollution and, on the other hand, socio-cultural effects on society.

== See also ==
- Animal culture – Theory of cultural learning in non-human animals
- Cultural loss – Erosion of cultural practices or beliefs
- Cultural area – Geographical area associated with a specific cultural orientation
- Cultural identity – Identity or feeling of belonging to a group
- Cultural tourism – Geographical tourism around a country or a region
- Culture 21 – United Nations plan of action
- Outline of culture – Social behavior and norms of a society
- Recombinant culture
- Semiotics of culture – Field of study
- Subculture – Smaller culture within a larger culture
