= Correspondence principle (disambiguation) =

The correspondence principle is a concept in quantum theory and relativity.

Correspondence principle may also refer to:

- Correspondence principle (sociology), correspondence between social class and available education
- In public finance, the principle that identifies the places where it is beneficial to provide public goods and services
- Correspondence principle (economics), the fact that determining the stability of an economic equilibrium corresponds to deriving results in comparative statics
- One of the seven Principles cited in the esoteric book The Kybalion.
- Correspondence theorem, theorem regarding the relation between subgroups and groups in group theory
