= Big Five personality traits and culture =

Big Five traits across cultures

The Big Five personality traits are Openness, Conscientiousness, Extraversion, Agreeableness, and Neuroticism. The Big Five Personality is a test that people can take to learn more about their personality in relation to the five personality traits. Cross-cultural psychology as a discipline examines the way that human behavior is different and/or similar across different cultures. One important and widely studied area in this subfield of psychology is personality, particularly the study of Big Five. The Big Five model of personality (also known as the Five Factor Model) has become the most extensively studied model of personality and has broad support, starting in the United States and later in many different cultures. The Big Five model of personality (also known as the Five Factor Model or the Big Five Inventory) started in the United States, and through the years has been translated into many languages and has been used in many countries. Some researchers were attempting to determine the differences in how other cultures perceive this model. Some research shows that the Big Five holds up across cultures even with its origin in the English language. However, there is also some evidence which suggests that the Big Five traits may not be sufficient to completely explain personality in other cultures. In regions such as South America and East Asia, the results weren't as accurate because they weren't as open as some people in other countries are.

== Supportive research ==
Research suggests that the same five-factor structure of personality can be found in multiple other countries, based on a translated version of the Revised NEO Personality Inventory. Studies on the validity of the Five-Factor Model using translations of the Revised NEO Personality Inventory have found broad support across many studies and in many countries; in earlier studies, Extraversion and Neuroticism were reported as stable personality scales across several cultures, including German, Dutch, French, Japanese, Chinese, and Filipino samples.

Further research found support for the entire Five-Factor Model in Chinese, Dutch, Italian, Hungarian, German, Australian, South African, Canadian, Finnish, Polish, Portuguese, Israeli, Korean, Japanese, and Filipino samples, in addition to other samples. Across multiple studies, factor analyses of translations of the Revised NEO Personality Inventory in languages from different language families consistently load on five factors that largely correspond to the Big Five personality traits. Additionally, the Big Five traits have been found in the personality ratings of observers in over 50 cultures, indicating that the previous findings were not dependent merely on ratings of the self. Overall, this body of work has established the validity of the Five-Factor model cross-culturally, potentially providing evidence for the Five-Factor Model as a universal taxonomy of personality structure.

== Comparisons ==
One approach psychologists have taken when examining Big Five traits in different cultures has been to examine either similarities or differences between cultures. Generally, researchers examine the average levels of a trait (or multiple traits) across an entire culture to make comparisons cross-culturally.

=== Similarities ===
There are many similarities in Big Five trait expression across cultures. For example, differences between men and women in Big Five traits, although small compared to variation within gender, do seem to exist consistently across a number of cultures. In general, women tend to score higher on neuroticism and agreeableness. Additionally, longitudinal studies have found consistency in personality changes that occur across the lifetime, in both adults and adolescents. Research in Big Five traits in American and Flemish teens showed similar changes in personality from ages 12 to 18. In addition, the period from young adulthood to middle adulthood is associated with increases in Conscientiousness and Agreeableness and decreases in Neuroticism, Openness, and Extraversion in several countries, including the United States, Germany, Italy, Portugal, Croatia, and South Korea.

=== Differences ===
It is also important to note that when examining the average personality traits of individuals in cultural groups, differences between cultures seem to exist. Some research compares one culture against another culture on a specific Big Five personality trait; Filipinos, for example, score relatively low on Neuroticism on average, compared to other cultures measured, while scoring in the middle of the scale on Extraversion. Americans, New Zealanders, and Canadians score higher on Extraversion, while scoring moderately on Neuroticism. These differences, however, exist on average, and there is still a large amount of variability in Big Five personality traits that exists within a particular culture. Gender differences in personality tend to be larger in developed societies (such as France and the United States) compared to less-developed countries (such as Zimbabwe and Malaysia). However, although these findings are quite robust, one consideration is that these differences between cultures might be the result of translation errors, differences in self-presentation styles, or even genetic differences.

Furthermore, although broad evidence suggests that the Big Five traits do measure meaningful constructs across a great deal of cultures, it is also true that expressions of mean levels of personality are necessarily influenced by culture. That is to say, all individuals scoring high on a certain Big Five personality trait such as Extraversion are likely to enjoy socialization with others, but where, when, and with whom they socialize is necessarily influenced by their cultural milieu. Thus, it may be most productive to think of the Five Factor Model as a framework for beginning to explore systematically individual differences in behavior within a particular culture.

== Criticism ==
Some controversy exists over whether or not the Big Five are relevant to all other cultures, especially given that the Big Five were developed via factor analysis from English words. The factor analysis helped determine that there are only five factors. Although support for the Big Five across cultures is quite robust, it is unclear whether or not the Big Five personality traits are the best possible measure of personality across all cultures. Another model that can measure personality is the Myers–Briggs Type Indicator. Some additional controversy to the Five Factor Model is that this model can measure up to relating to personalities which implies that most people think this is the best model. One problem that some people, specifically psychologists, have with the personality traits is how accurate they are within other cultures. Some researchers suggest that important aspects of certain cultures which could include the personality traits of honesty and humility are not captured by the Five Factor Model. The Five Factor Model is used in several cultures throughout North America, South America, Europe, Africa, and Asia.

Throughout the years, the Five Factor Model has experienced many changes as it has developed because it originally only had three factors within Eysenck's model which only included Extraversion, Psychoticism, and Neuroticism. Some parts of the Five Factor Model have been challenged or changed by other researchers based on their prior knowledge. Some researchers tend to question the personality traits included in this because some believe that the traits should be more specific. Most of the controversy with the Five Factor Model involves the traits and personality, as well as the origin of these five factors. Some researchers don't believe that the Five Factor Model uses personality correctly.

Several questions that researchers have asked about controversy about the Five Factor Model is if people can understand it, if the measures are accurate, and if it represents personality correctly. The measures for the Five Factor Model include the Big Five Inventory which has 44 items to measure the five personality traits. The Five Factor Model is questioned if people can understand it because there is controversy if more personality traits should be included in this model or not. Some researchers question if the measures are accurate because of the variables that are used and the bias that is often found within this model. There are even some researchers that want to study if the Five Factor Model represents personality correctly, since some researchers believe that there should be more or fewer categories of personality traits involved.

Beyond the validity of the factor structure across cultures, there has been criticism of the idea that it can be used to measure cultural differences. Researchers compared self-report personality data for conscientiousness across cultures in Europe and compared these to behavioral markers of conscientiousness across cultures, such as the accuracy of bank clocks and how efficiently post office workers gave change for a purchase. For most markers, personality measures of conscientiousness were correlated in the wrong direction with the behavioral markers across cultures. For example, cultures that had more accurate bank clocks tended to score lower on conscientiousness in the Big Five personality scale. One explanation for this is the "reference group effect," whereby people in very conscientious cultures rate themselves lower because they perceive the people around them as very conscientious.

=== HEXACO model of personality ===
One proposed alternative to the Big Five that has been developed via cross-cultural research is the HEXACO model. This model builds on the research of the Big Five traits, with the novel addition of a trait named Honesty-Humility. Individuals high in the trait of honesty-humility are associated with the characteristics of straightforwardness, modesty, and fairness. In addition, the HEXACO model contains slightly rotated versions of two of the Big Five traits (Agreeableness and Neuroticism) such that sentimentality/toughness becomes part of the old Neuroticism trait (and renamed Emotionality) and anger/even-temper becomes associated with the new Agreeableness trait. This rotation creates less overlap among the six personality traits of the HEXACO, and allows for better prediction of behaviors such as deceit without hostility (e.g. social monitoring). Support for the HEXACO model has been found in multiple countries, including Dutch, French, German, Italian, Korean, Polish, and English samples.

=== Chinese Personality Assessment Inventory ===
Chinese psychologists have attempted to develop an indigenous measure of personality, named the Chinese Personality Assessment Inventory (CPAI). Traits in the CPAI model have also collectively been referred to as "Interpersonal Relatedness," and include:

- Harmony (one's inner peace of mind, interpersonal harmony, etc.)
- Ren Qing (relationship orientation, which covers adherence to cultural norms of interaction such as those based on reciprocity)
- Modernization (contrasted with attitudes toward traditional Chinese beliefs)
- Thrift vs. Extravagance
- Ah-Q Mentality (defensiveness, externalization of blame)
- Face (social behaviors done in order to enhance or avoid damaging one's reputation and honor)

Support for this model of personality was originally developed in studies in mainland China and Hong Kong, China, but the existence of the Interpersonal Relatedness dimension of personality has also been found in samples from Singapore, Hawaii, and the Midwestern United States.

=== Other possible models ===
Other researchers have found different personality dimensions that may exists in different cultural contexts. For example, one study of a Filipino sample used both indigenous Filipino personality scales and the NEO-PI-R, and although there was overlap between the Filipino scales and the Five Factor Model, researchers also found indigenous factors such as Pagkamadaldal (Social Curiosity) and Pagkamapagsapalaran (Risk-Taking) that had predictive power greater than the Five Factor Model alone. Other research using indigenous approaches to traits has taken place in countries such as India, Korea, and Greece. A Chinese factor analysis of traits in 2009 found seven factors (three or four of which resembled Big Five traits). A similar study in Spain in 1997 found seven Spanish personality factors. However, the seven factors were not the same across the two countries. Thus, it is clear that although there is strong support for the Big Five across cultures, some research suggests the existence of other traits besides simply the Big Five, which may ultimately improve our understanding of personality across different cultures.
