= Social osmosis =

Indirect infusion of knowledge

Social osmosis or cultural osmosis is the indirect infusion of social or cultural knowledge. Effectively, social content is diffused, and by happenstance, authentic experience is displaced by repeated absorption of such content or information through auxiliary means, thus leading the subject to acquiring knowledge of social phenomena.

An example of social osmosis would be knowing a TV show exists and possessing detailed information concerning aspects of the show, such as key imagery or the names of the characters, without actively acquiring said knowledge by watching the show or even being interested in it.

== Sources ==
- Raaj K. Sah, "Social Osmosis And Patterns Of Crime". Published in The Journal of Political Economy, Vol. 99, No. 6. (December 1991), pp. 1272–1295.
- "Indoctrination as a normative conception" Studies in Philosophy and Education Volume 4, Number 4 / December, 1966
- Social Osmosis: Refugees in Hong Kong AD Barnett, 1953
- "Reverse Social Osmosis in Uttar Pradesh" Economic and Political Weekly, 2007 (epw.org.in)

== See also ==
- Osmosis, the movement of molecules through a membrane
