= Correspondence principle (sociology) =

The correspondence principle or correspondence thesis is a sociological theory that posits a close relationship between social standing and the educational system. Writers in this vein (notably Gary Watson and Diep Tran) are in particular interested in the relationship between a person’s social standing and the type of education that is received at school.

In its most basic form, the principle states that the social relations of the school can be directly related to those in the work-place, meaning that educational institutions prepare students for their future work roles. Apart from the formal curriculum that is offered by the school, the advocates of the correspondence principle argue that the structure of the school and also the personal experience given to each student (the hidden curriculum) is important to their future socialization. They also emphasize that there is a strong relationship between the child’s education and the interaction they have with their parents at home. There is a significant inter generational replication of consciousness and socialized inequality via the linkages among the authority relations experienced by fathers at work, transferred to child-rearing styles, and replicated in school interaction with teachers.

== Relationship to conflict theory ==
The correspondence principle is broadly aligned with the conflict theory approach to sociology, which originated with Karl Marx. Marx's said that there is a social class division in capitalist society, between on the one hand a small percentage of the population who are capitalists, owning the means of production, and on the other workers, who sell their labor power to the capitalists. The correspondence principle advances a neo-Marxist argument about the specific nature of the institutional linkages in the family, school, and work "chain" comprising the socio-economic life cycle.

Many sociologists who support this principle argue that education is just a means of maintaining social class boundaries. Many argue that schools in capitalistic societies are geared toward giving children different types of education based solely on their social standing rather than by their inherent skills. Under this principle schools are believed to give lower class children a different type of education compared to their upper class counterparts. Typically, it is said that lower class children are put on an educational track that will prepare them for blue-collar jobs. It is thought that the education of lower class children is different because it prepares them to enter the work force directly after high school. Schooling teaches working class children to sit quietly at their desk, obey the teacher’s authority, and also acquaints them with becoming familiar with repetitive tasks. Similarly, the education of upper-class children is thought to be geared toward upper-class or white-collar professions professions. With upper-class children, instead of focusing on preparing them to enter the workforce, there is added emphasis is on preparing them to move on to four year colleges and universities after high school. Here they are trained to be professionals and capitalists by teaching them how to think critically and instilling in them a sense of responsibility and authority.
