= Ozlem Ayduk =

American professor of psychology

- Özlem Ayduk
- Born: Özlem Nefise Ayduk; Turkey
- Years active: 1999–present

Academic background
- Education: Ph.D.
- Alma mater: Boğaziçi University (B.A. 1992); Columbia University (Ph.D. 1999, M.A. 1995)
- Thesis: Impact of self-control strategies on the link between rejection sensitivity and hostility: Risk negotiation through strategic control. (1999)
- Doctoral advisor: Walter Mischel

Academic work
- Discipline: Psychologist
- Sub-discipline: Social Psychology
- Institutions: U.C. Berkeley

Ozlem Ayduk (Turkish: Özlem Nefise Ayduk) is a Turkish-American social psychologist at U.C. Berkeley researching close relationships, emotion regulation, and the development of self-regulation in children. She is a fellow of the American Association for the Advancement of Science, Society of Experimental Social Psychology and the Society for Personality and Social Psychology. She has contributed content to several psychology handbooks, dictionaries, and encyclopedias.

== Early life ==
Ayduk became interested in understanding human behavior in middle school when she began reading books on personality and psychopathology. Combined with her longstanding desire to become a scientist, her newfound interest led her to pursue a career in psychology. In 1991, she earned her B.A. in psychology and political science from Boğaziçi University in Istanbul. Moving to America, she earned her M.A. and Ph.D. in psychology from Columbia University in 1995 and 1999, respectively.

== Career ==
Ayduk worked as a postdoctoral fellow at Columbia University for three years before heading west to California in 2002 to join the U.C. Berkeley department of psychology as an assistant professor. She became an associate professor in 2009, and a full professor in 2015. Ayduk is a co-director of the Relationship and Social Cognition Lab at U.C. Berkeley. She has been active with professional psychology societies. She is a Fellow at the Society of Experimental Social Psychology and served on its executive board (2015–2018) and is also a Fellow at the Society for Personality and Social Psychology, where she served on the grant review panel (2016–2017) and a three-year term on the board of directors (2018–2020).

At Berkeley, Ayduk has taught and supervised research in social and personality psychology, including work on personality, emotion regulation, motivation, and close relationships. She received the university's Social Sciences Distinguished Teaching Award in 2021.

She has also held research and teaching roles outside Berkeley, including a Distinguished Research Fellowship at Sabancı University in Turkey from 2020 to 2022. Her academic work has included research on personality, motivation, social cognition, and relationships.

She has served in professional organizations in psychology, including the Society for Personality and Social Psychology and the Society of Experimental Social Psychology. She was elected a fellow of the Society of Experimental Social Psychology in 2008, the American Psychological Association's Society for Psychological Science in 2014, and the Society for Personality and Social Psychology in 2016.

== Research ==
Ayduk's research examines self-regulation, emotion regulation, social cognition, personality, and interpersonal relationships. Her work combines experimental and longitudinal methods with measures of cognitive, emotional, and physiological processes. At the University of California, Berkeley, she directs research on relationships and social cognition, including friendships, romantic relationships, and intergroup relationships.

=== Rejection sensitivity ===
A central theme of Ayduk's research is rejection sensitivity, the tendency to anxiously expect, readily perceive, and strongly respond to social rejection. Her early studies examined the relationship between rejection sensitivity and hostile responses to interpersonal rejection. In a 1999 study, she and her colleagues found that rejection sensitivity was associated with hostile thoughts and behavior following rejection, particularly among women.

Ayduk subsequently examined the processes through which rejection sensitivity affects interpersonal behavior. Her 2000 study with Rodolfo Mendoza-Denton, Walter Mischel, Geraldine Downey and others examined whether self-regulatory strategies could moderate the relationship between rejection sensitivity and adverse interpersonal outcomes. The researchers used measures of delay of gratification to examine whether differences in self-regulation affected responses to anticipated or actual rejection.

Her later research investigated rejection sensitivity in relation to aggression, attention, self-concept, executive control, and personality. A 2008 study examined rejection sensitivity and executive control as joint predictors of borderline personality features. Another study found that rejection sensitivity moderated the effect of interpersonal rejection on self-concept clarity.

Ayduk also studied the role of attentional control in responses to rejection. Her work with Mischel and Downey distinguished between a more emotionally reactive "hot" focus and a more detached "cool" focus when people process rejection-related information. The studies examined whether attentional strategies could influence hostile reactions to rejection.

=== Self-regulation and delay of gratification ===
Ayduk's work with Walter Mischel examined self-regulation and delay of gratification across childhood and adulthood. Their research followed participants from earlier delay-of-gratification studies and examined the relationship between childhood self-regulatory behavior and later cognitive, emotional, and interpersonal functioning.

A 2000 study used participants from the original Stanford delay-of-gratification research as part of a broader investigation of whether childhood self-regulation moderated the effects of rejection sensitivity later in life.

Subsequent studies examined the relationship between early delay of gratification and later cognitive control. Research with Mischel, Yuichi Shoda and other collaborators followed participants from preschool into adolescence and young adulthood, examining the development of cognitive control over time.

Ayduk also participated in research examining the neural correlates of delay of gratification. A 2015 study linked childhood delay-of-gratification performance with interactions between cortical regions and the nucleus accumbens, providing a neurocognitive perspective on individual differences in self-regulation.

Her research has also examined changes across generations. In a 2018 study, Ayduk and colleagues compared cohorts of children completing delay-of-gratification tasks and examined whether performance differed between children studied during the original research period and those assessed decades later.

=== Self-distancing and emotion regulation ===
Another major area of Ayduk's research concerns self-distancing, or adopting psychological distance from one's own experiences when reflecting on them. With Ethan Kross, she examined the distinction between reflective processing that can help people understand negative experiences and forms of self-focused rumination that can maintain emotional distress.

In a series of studies, Ayduk and Kross investigated whether people could process negative experiences more adaptively by adopting a distanced perspective. Their 2010 paper, "From a Distance: Implications of Spontaneous Self-Distancing for Adaptive Self-Reflection," examined the relationship between self-distancing and emotional responses to negative experiences. Their research also examined linguistic forms of distancing. Subsequent studies investigated whether referring to oneself by one's own name or using third-person language could alter emotional responses and promote more detached reasoning. Other work examined temporal distancing, in which individuals consider a stressful event from a more distant point in time.

Ayduk and collaborators later studied whether self-distancing could affect interpersonal behavior. A 2017 study examined self-distancing during the provision of criticism and reported changes in interpersonal perceptions and behavior associated with reduced activity in the medial prefrontal cortex.

More recent work has extended this research to everyday emotion regulation. Her 2025 publications include research on the frequency and function of self-talk in everyday life and on the use of different emotion-regulation strategies in daily experience.

=== Relationships and interpersonal processes ===
Ayduk has also studied self-esteem, rejection, and emotion regulation in close relationships. Her research has examined how individuals with different levels of rejection sensitivity respond to feedback from romantic partners and how self-esteem influences the expression of affection and responses to interpersonal situations.

Her research program has expanded to intergroup relationships and mentoring, particularly relationships between mentors and students from underrepresented groups in STEM fields. With Rodolfo Mendoza-Denton and other collaborators, she examined emotional and interpersonal processes in interracial mentoring and investigated approaches intended to improve mentoring relationships. A 2018 study examined whether reducing negative affect and increasing interpersonal rapport improved outcomes in interracial mentoring.

=== Recent research ===
Ayduk's more recent publications have extended her research into developmental and everyday emotional processes. Her 2024 publications include a study of children's delay-of-gratification abilities in relation to inhibited temperament and caregiver behavior. Her 2025 work includes studies of emotional habituation, emotion recognition in early childhood, everyday self-talk, and emotion-regulation strategies.

Her research has appeared in journals including Journal of Personality and Social Psychology, Psychological Science, Personality and Social Psychology Bulletin, Emotion, Developmental Psychology, Social Cognitive and Affective Neuroscience, Journal of Research in Personality, and Clinical Psychological Science.

== Honors ==
- 1993–1994: Delta Kappa Gamma World Fellowship
- 1993–1997: Fulbright Fellow
- 1993–1998: Faculty Fellowship, Columbia University
- 2004: Hellman Fellow
- 2008: Fellow, Society of Experimental Social Psychology
- 2014: Fellow, American Psychological Society
- 2016: Fellow, Society for Personality and Social Psychology
- 2022: Fellow, American Association for the Advancement of Science (AAAS)
- 2022: Carol and Ed Diener Award in Personality Psychology, Society for Personality
- Social Sciences Distinguished Teaching Award, University of California, Berkeley — .
- 2021:Distinguished Research Fellow, Sabancı University — 2020–2022.

== Selected bibliography ==
=== Articles ===
- 2015: "Pronouns Matter when Psyching Yourself Up". Harvard Business Review

=== Books ===
- 2004: Current directions in personality psychology. Pearson Prentice Hall
- 2007: Introduction to personality: Toward an integrative science of the person (8th edition). Wiley

=== Research papers ===
==== Self-distancing & emotion regulation ====
- 2005: "When asking 'why' doesn’t hurt: Distinguishing rumination from reflective processing of negative emotions". Psychological Science
- 2010: "From a distance: Implications of spontaneous self-distancing for adaptive self-reflection". Journal of Personality and Social Psychology
- 2014: "Self-Talk as a Regulatory Mechanism: How You Do It Matters". Journal of Personality and Social Psychology
- 2015: "This too shall pass: Temporal Distance and the Regulation of Emotions". Journal of Personality and Social Psychology
- 2018: "Self Distancing: Basic Mechanisms and Clinical Implications". In International Handbook of Self-Control in Health and Well Being. Routledge

==== Self regulation, delay of gratification ====
- 2000: "Regulating the interpersonal self: Strategic self-regulation for coping with rejection sensitivity". Journal of Personality and Social Psychology
- 2011: "'Willpower' over the lifespan: decomposing self-regulation". Social Cognitive and Affective Neuroscience
- 2011: "Behavioral and neural correlates of delay of gratification 40 years later". Proceedings of the National Academy of Sciences.
- 2013: "Preschoolers' delay of gratification predicts their body mass 30 years later". The Journal of Pediatrics
- 2014: "The role of emotion and emotion regulation in the ability to delay gratification". In Handbook of Emotion Regulation. Guilford Press

==== Rejection sensitivity, close relationships ====
- 1999: "Does rejection elicit hostility in rejection sensitive women?". Social Cognition
- 2001: "Rejection sensitivity and depressive symptoms in women". Personality and Social Psychology Bulletin
- 2002: "Attentional mechanisms linking rejection to hostile reactivity: The role of 'hot' vs. 'cool' focus". Psychological Science
- 2007: "Defensive physiological reactions to rejection: the effect of self-esteem and attentional control on startle responses". Psychological Science
- 2008: "Individual differences in the rejection-aggression link in the hot sauce paradigm: The case of Rejection Sensitivity". Journal of Experimental Social Psychology

== See also ==
- Stanford marshmallow experiment
