= Biospheric model of personality =

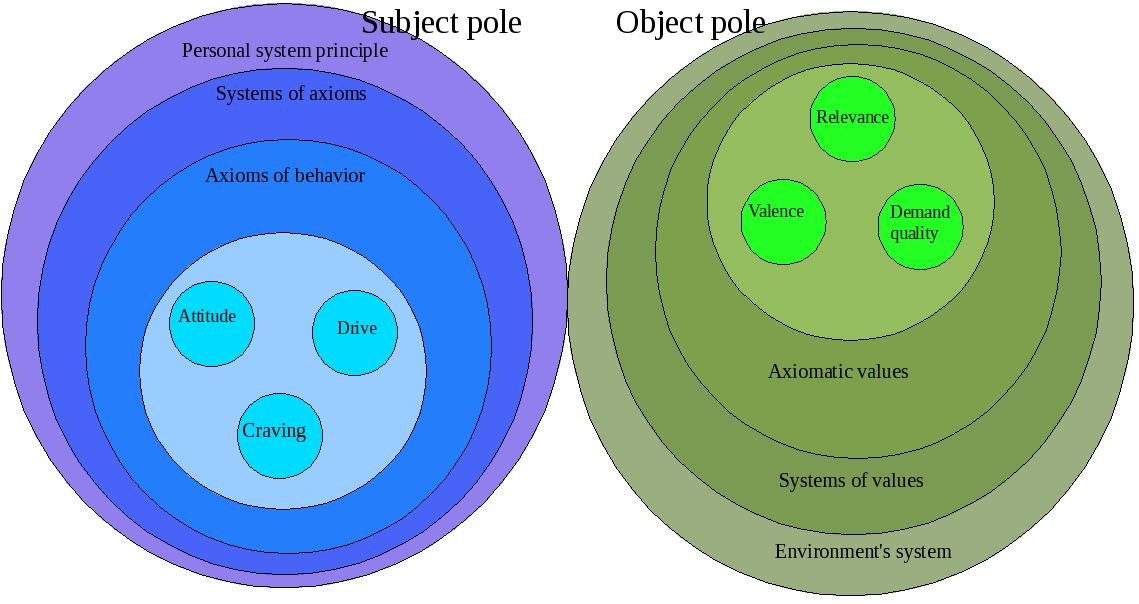
- Concepts; Biosphere; Subject pole Object pole Axioms of behavior Personal system principle Proponents; Andras Angyal Relevant works Foundations for a science of personality

The biospheric model of personality is a contribution to the psychology of personality proposed by Andras Angyal in 1941. According to this model, the biosphere is the system of the individual and their environment, consisting of Subject subsystem (the individual) and Object subsystem (the environment).

== Description ==
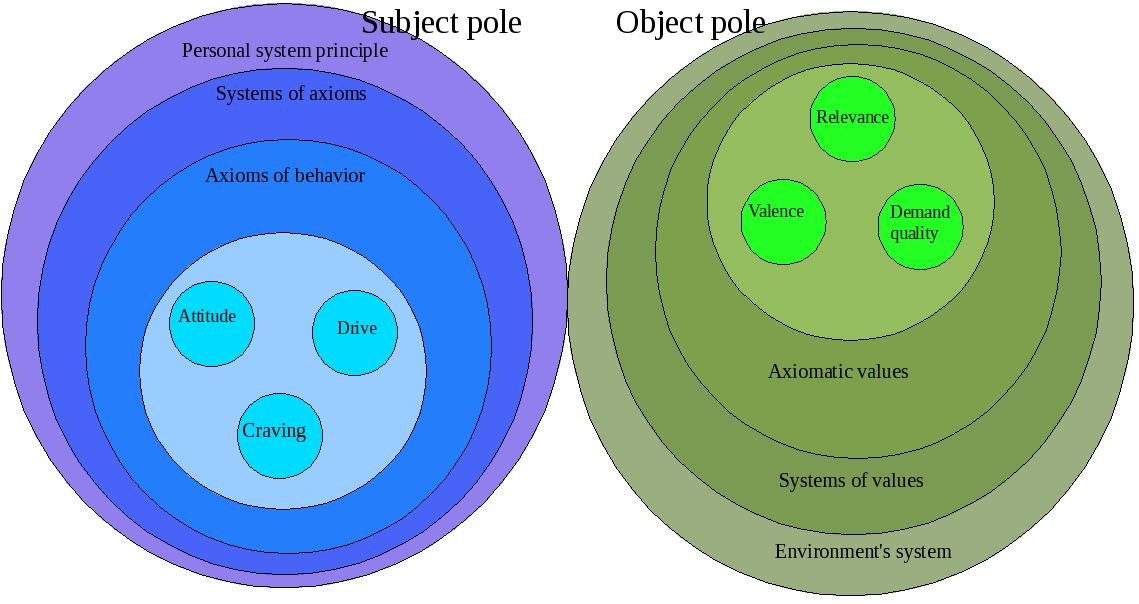
The biosphere according to A. Angyal

The following outlines the author's holistic view of the biosphere:

- The Subject pole:

Elements: attitude, drive, craving;

Organized into: axioms of behavior, systems of axioms, the personal system principle.

- The Object pole:

Elements: relevance, valence, demand quality;

Organized into: axiomatic values, systems of values, the environment's system.

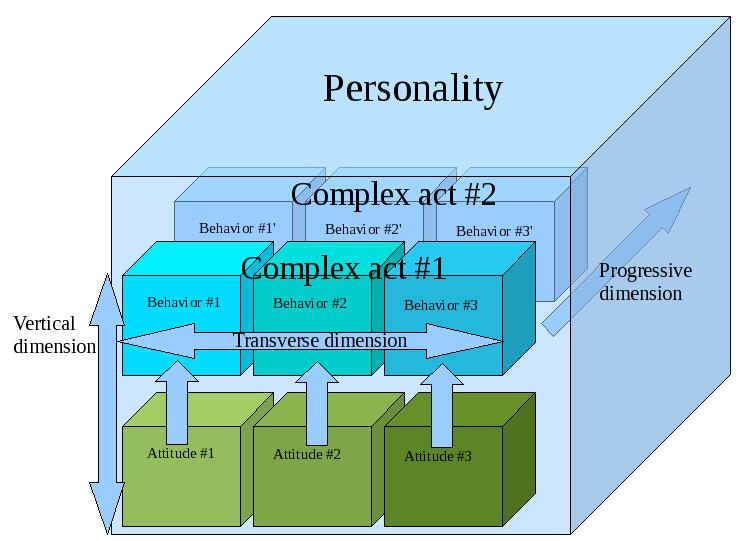
Biospheric dimensions of personality

Angyal describes three personality dimensions:

- vertical dimension, with surface behavior and deep attitudes that guide that behavior;
- progressive dimension, which is the series of behaviors that lead to attaining a goal;
- transverse dimension, which is the simultaneous coordination of elementary behaviors into complex acts.

Biosphere dynamics is generated by the tension between the poles of each dimension. There are two fundamental tendencies of the person in relationship with her environment:

- autonomy, or domination of the environment by the person;
- homonymy, or the adjustment of the person to the environment.

== Psychopathology ==
According to Angyal's model, psychopathology is caused by the segregation of the two poles of one or more personality dimensions. This segregation can be:

- vertical, between attitudes and behavior, leading to deceptive behavior;
- progressive, between goals and means to attain them, leading to frustration;
- transverse, leading to behavior dissociation and incoherence (encountered in psychosis).

== See also ==
- Cognitive-affective personality system
- Hypostatic model of personality
- Personality systematics
- Systems psychology
- Organismic theory
