= Delayed gratification =

Resistance of an immediate reward in return for a greater reward later

Delayed gratification, or deferred gratification, is the ability to resist the temptation of an immediate reward in favor of a more valuable and long-lasting reward later. It involves forgoing a smaller, immediate pleasure to achieve a larger or more enduring benefit in the future. A growing body of literature has linked the ability to delay gratification to a host of other positive outcomes, including academic success, physical health, psychological health, and social competence.

A person's ability to delay gratification relates to other similar skills such as patience, impulse control, self-control and willpower, all of which are involved in self-regulation. Broadly, self-regulation encompasses a person's capacity to adapt the self as necessary to meet demands of the environment. Delaying gratification is the reverse of delay discounting, which is "the preference for smaller immediate rewards over larger but delayed rewards" and refers to the "fact that the subjective value of reward decreases with increasing delay to its receipt". It is theorized that the ability to choose delayed rewards may either arise from developmental plasticity or depend on behavioral plasticity, as described in the cognitive-affective personality system (CAPS) model.

Several factors can affect a person's ability to delay gratification. Cognitive strategies, such as the use of distracting or "cool" thoughts, can increase delay ability, as can neurological factors, such as strength of connections in the frontal-striatal pathway. Behavioral researchers have focused on the contingencies that govern choices to delay reinforcement, and have studied how to manipulate those contingencies in order to lengthen delay. Age plays a role too; children under five years old demonstrate a marked lack of delayed gratification ability and most commonly seek immediate gratification. A very small difference between males and females suggest that females may be better at delaying rewards. The inability to choose to wait rather than seek immediate reinforcement is related to avoidance-related behaviors such as procrastination, and to other clinical diagnoses such as anxiety, attention deficit hyperactivity disorder and depression.

Sigmund Freud, the founder of psychoanalytic theory, discussed the ego's role in balancing the immediate pleasure-driven desires of the id with the morality-driven choices of the superego. Funder and Block expanded psychoanalytic research on the topic, and found that impulsivity, or a lack of ego-control, has a stronger effect on one's ability to choose delayed rewards if a reward is more desirable. Finally, environmental and social factors play a role; for example, delay is affected by the self-imposed or external nature of a reward contingency, by the degree of task engagement required during the delay, by early mother-child relationship characteristics, by a person's previous experiences with unreliable promises of rewards (e.g., in poverty), and by contemporary sociocultural expectations and paradigms. Research on animals comprises another body of literature describing delayed gratification characteristics that are not as easily tested in human samples, such as ecological factors affecting the skill.

== Background ==
=== Cognitive-affective processing system ===
One well-supported theory of self-regulation, called the Cognitive-affective personality system (CAPS), suggests that delaying gratification results from an ability to use "cool" regulatory strategies (i.e., calm, controlled and cognitive strategies) over "hot regulatory strategies (i.e., emotional, impulsive, automatic reactions), when faced with provocation. In "hot" processing, a person thinks intently about the object causing temptation, and especially about its most appealing elements, and is subsequently less able to resist the immediate reward. The use of cool strategies can translate to more control over behavior. Effective "cool" strategies involve distraction and restructuring the perception of the tempting stimulus to make it seem less appealing. For example, in one study of pre-adolescent boys with behavioral problems, the boys showed a reduction in verbal and physical aggression when they used "cool" strategies, such as looking away or distracting themselves. The most effective type of distraction seems to be imagining another desirable reward, which takes attention away from the immediate temptations.

=== Stanford marshmallow experiment ===
The seminal research on delayed gratification – the now-famous "marshmallow experiment" – was conducted by Walter Mischel in the 1960s and 1970s at Stanford University. Mischel and his colleagues were interested in strategies that preschool children used to resist temptation. They presented four-year-olds with a marshmallow and told the children that they had two options: (1) ring a bell at any point to summon the experimenter and eat the marshmallow, or (2) wait until the experimenter returned (about 15 minutes later), and earn two marshmallows. The message was: "small reward now, bigger reward later." Some children broke down and ate the marshmallow, whereas others were able to delay gratification and earn the coveted two marshmallows. In follow-up experiments, Mischel found that children were able to wait longer if they used certain "cool" distraction techniques (covering their eyes, hiding under the desk, singing songs, or imagining pretzels instead of the marshmallow in front of them), or if they changed the way they thought about the marshmallow (focusing on its similarity to a cotton ball, rather than on its gooey, delectable taste).

The children who waited longer, when re-evaluated as teenagers and adults, demonstrated a striking array of advantages over their peers. As teenagers, they had higher SAT scores, social competence, self-assuredness and self-worth, and were rated by their parents as more mature, better able to cope with stress, more likely to plan ahead, and more likely to use reason. They were less likely to have conduct disorders or high levels of impulsivity, aggressiveness and hyperactivity. As adults, the high delayers were less likely to have drug problems or other addictive behaviors, get divorced, or be overweight. Each minute that a preschooler was able to delay gratification translated on average to a reduction of 0.2 points of the Body Mass Index 30 years later.

Each of these positive outcomes requires some ability to forgo short-term reward in favor of a higher payoff in the future. The ability to delay gratification also appears to be a buffer against rejection sensitivity (the tendency to be anxious when anticipating interpersonal rejection). In a 20-year follow-up of the marshmallow experiment, individuals with vulnerability to high rejection sensitivity who had shown strong delay of gratification abilities as preschoolers had higher self-esteem and self-worth and more adaptive coping skills, in comparison to the individuals who had high rejection sensitivity but low delay of gratification as four-year-olds. These compelling longitudinal findings converge with other studies showing a similar pattern: The ability to resist temptation early in life translates to persistent benefits across settings.

Forty years after the first marshmallow test studies, neuroimaging data has shed light on the neural correlates of delayed gratification. A team led by B. J. Casey, of Cornell University, recruited 59 of the original participants – who are now in their mid-40s – and gave them a delayed gratification task. Instead of resisting marshmallows, these adults were instructed to suppress responses to images of happy faces, but not to neutral or fearful faces. Those who had been high delayers as pre-schoolers were more successful at controlling their impulses in response to the emotional faces (i.e., not pressing the button in response to happy faces), suggesting that the high delayers continued to show better ability to dampen or resist impulses. Casey and colleagues also scanned the brains of 26 participants using functional magnetic resonance imaging (fMRI) as they completed the task. The researchers hypothesized that high delayers would be more likely to use "cool" regulation strategies to control their responses, which would manifest as activation of the right prefrontal cortex, whereas low delayers would use "hot" strategies, which would activate the ventral striatum, an area also linked to addiction. Indeed, results showed this differential brain activity. This mirrors other fMRI research of delayed gratification conducted by Noah Shamosh and Jeremy Gray, of Yale University, demonstrating that individuals who chose larger delayed rewards over smaller immediate rewards (in hypothetical situations) showed greater brain activation in the anterior prefrontal cortex.

A replication attempt with a sample from a more diverse population that was over 10 times larger than the original study showed only half the effect of the original study. The replication suggested that economic background, rather than willpower, explained the other half. The predictive power of the marshmallow test was challenged in a 2020 study. Work done in 2018 and 2024 found that the marshmallow test "does not reliably predict adult functioning".

== Factors affecting one's ability ==
=== Neurocognitive factors ===
The way that a person frames a situation heavily influences a decision's outcome. Research on "hot" and "cool" strategies suggests that when children cognitively represent what they are waiting for as a real reward by focusing on the reward's arousing, "hot" qualities (taste, smell, sound, feel, etc.) their self-control and delay of gratification decreases, while directing attention to a symbol of the reward by focusing on its abstract, "cool" qualities (shape, color, number, etc.), can enhance self-control and increase the delay. Optimal self-control and the longest delay to gratification can be achieved by directing attention to a competing item, especially the arousing, "hot" qualities of a competing item. For example, delays are increased when thinking about the taste and smell of popcorn while waiting to eat candy. This illustrates an individual's ability to manipulate their cognitive representation of external stimuli for goal-directed purposes.

Delaying gratification is the same as controlling the impulse for immediate gratification, which requires cognitive control. The ventral striatum, located in the midbrain, is the part of the limbic system that is the reward center as well as a pleasure center. The limbic system will always react to the potential for instant pleasure. To override this instinct, the prefrontal cortex, which is also associated with reasoning and rational thought, must be active. The prefrontal cortex is also the part of the brain that determines the focus of a person's attention, which enables a better framing that facilitates delayed gratification. During adolescence and early adulthood, the prefrontal cortex develops and matures to become more complicated and connected with the rest of the brain. Older children and adults find the deferment-of-gratification tasks easier than do young children for this reason. However, the relative ability to defer gratification remains stable throughout development. Children who can better control impulses grow up to be adults who also have better control. Practicing deferred gratification is quite beneficial to cognitive abilities throughout life.

=== Behavioral factors ===
Behaviorists focus on the acquisition and teaching of delayed gratification, and have developed therapeutic techniques for increasing ability to delay. Behavior analysts capitalize on the effective principles of reinforcement when shaping behavior by making rewards contingent on the person's current behavior, which promotes learning a delay of gratification.

For a behavior modification regimen to succeed, the reward must have some value to the participant. Without a reward that is meaningful, providing delayed or immediate gratification serves little purpose, as the reward is not a strong reinforcer of the desired behavior.

Behavior theorists see delaying gratification as an adaptive skill. It has been shown that learning to delay gratification promotes positive social behavior, such as sharing and positive peer interactions. For example, students who learn to delay gratification are better able to complete their assigned activities. To put it simply, if someone undertakes an activity with the promise of a delayed reward after, the task's completion becomes more likely.

Behavioral researchers have found that a choice for instant versus delayed gratification is influenced by several factors including whether the reward is negative or positive reinforcement. A past study by Solnick et al., focused on an experiment where the main concentrations were time added to both conditions and the preference of the participants with experiencing a loud noise for variable amounts of time: 15, 30, 60, and 90 seconds. The buttons to turn off the noise were manipulated by one button turning off the noise for a short amount of time and the other turning the noise off for an extended time. The participants were found to be more willing to turn off the noise immediately for 90 seconds rather than turning it off for the 120 seconds after a 60-second delay was issued. Findings illustrate that participants chose not to delay their gratification for the relief of noise but rather instantly silence it for a shorter amount of time.

==== Individual thresholds for delay ====
In a 2011 study, researchers tested to see if people would willingly choose between instant and delayed gratification by offering them a set amount of (hypothetical) money that they could receive presently, or telling them they could wait a month for more money. Results suggested that willingness to delay gratification depended on the amount of money being offered, but also showed wide individual variation in the threshold of later reward that was motivating enough to forgo the immediate reward. The subjective value of a reward can also stem from the way one describes the potential reward. As prospect theory states, people are heavily loss-averse. People tend to value a commodity more when it is considered to be something that can be lost or given up than when it is evaluated as a potential gain.

==== Duration of time delay ====
The duration of time until an eventual reward also affects participants' choice of immediate or delayed gratification. A 2001 study demonstrated that if a reward will not be granted for an extensive amount of time, such as 180–300 months (15–25 years), the monetary amount of the reward is inconsequential; instead, the bulk of the participants choose the immediate reward, even if their delayed reward would be quite large. Delayed gratification has its limits, and a delay can only be so long before it is judged to be not worth the effort it takes to wait.

==== Behavioral training ====
===== Applications in classroom settings =====
In a Year 3 elementary classroom in South Wales a teacher was having difficulty keeping three girls on task during designated private study times. The teacher reached for aid from behavior analysts, and a delayed gratification behavior modification plan was put into place. The study gave limits on the numbers of questions the children could ask, and if they did not exceed the limit, they were given tokens for rewards. The token economy for rewards is an example of delayed gratification, by way of cool processing. Instead of having the girls focus on attention-seeking behaviors that distracted the teacher and the students, the teacher had them focus on how many questions they had, and if they needed to ask for help from the teacher. They also focused on gaining tokens rather than focusing on the final reward, which increased their delays. By giving the children this goal and the promise of positive reinforcement for good behavior, the girls dropped their rate of question-asking and attention-seeking.

===== Applications to ADHD =====
Compared to non-affected children, those with ADHD generally demonstrate greater impulsivity by being influenced by reward immediacy and quality more than by the frequency of reward and effort to obtain it. However, researchers have empirically shown that these impulsive behavior patterns can be changed through the implementation of a simple self-control training procedure in which reinforcer immediacy competes with the frequency, quantity or saliency of the reward. One study demonstrated that any verbal activity while waiting for reinforcement increases delay to gratification in participants with ADHD. In another study, three children diagnosed with ADHD and demonstrating impulsivity were trained to prefer reward rate and saliency more than immediacy through manipulation of the quality of the reinforcers and by systematically increasing the delay with a changing-criterion design. Post-assessment of the children illustrated that self-control can transfer to untrained dimensions of reinforcement.

=== Across the lifespan ===
At birth, infants are unable to wait for their wants and needs to be met and exhibit a defining lack of impulse control. With age, developing children are able to retain impulsivity but also gain control over their immediate desires and are increasingly able to prolong gratification. Developmental psychologists study the progression of impulse control and delay of gratification over the lifespan, including deficiencies in development that are closely related to attention deficits and behavior problems.

Children under five years old display the least effective strategies for delaying gratification, such as looking at the reward and thinking about its arousing features. By 5 years old, most children are able to demonstrate better self-control by recognizing the counter-productivity of focusing on the reward. Five-year-olds often choose instead to actively distract themselves or even use self-instructions to remind themselves of the contingency that waiting produces a reward of a greater value. Between 8 and 13 years old, children develop the cognitive ability to differentiate and employ abstract versus arousing thoughts in order to distract their minds from the reward and thereby increase the delay. Once delaying strategies are developed, the capacity to resist temptation is relatively stable throughout adulthood. Preschoolers' performance on delayed gratification tasks correlates with their adolescent performance on tasks designed to measure similar constructs and processing, which parallels the corresponding development of willpower and the fronto-striatal circuit (neural pathways that connect the frontal lobe to other brain regions). Declines in self-regulation and impulse control in old age predict corresponding declines in reward-delaying strategies, specifically reduced temporal discounting due to a decrease in cooling strategies.

==== Effects of gender ====
Throughout 33 studies on gender differences, a small significant effect (r = .06) has been found indicating that a base-rate of 10% more females are able to choose delayed rewards than males. This effect may be related to the slight gender differences found in delay discounting (i.e., minimizing the value of a delayed reward) and higher levels of impulsivity and inattention in boys. Further studies are needed to analyze if this minute difference begins at a certain age (e.g., puberty) or if it has a stable magnitude throughout the lifespan. Some researchers suggest this gender difference may correspond with a mother's tendency to sacrifice her wants and needs in order to meet those of her child more frequently than a father does.

=== Clinical factors ===
==== Contemporary clinical psychology perspectives ====
Self-control has been called the "master virtue" by clinical and social psychologists, suggesting that the ability to delay gratification plays a critical role in a person's overall psychological adjustment. People with better ability to delay gratification report higher wellbeing, self-esteem and openness to experience, as well as more productive ways of responding to anger and other provocations. Early delay ability has been shown to protect against the development of a variety of emotional vulnerabilities later in life, such as aggression and features of borderline personality disorder. Meanwhile, many maladaptive coping skills that characterize mental illness entail a difficulty delaying gratification. The tendency to choose short-term rewards at the expense of longer-term benefits permeates many forms of psychopathology.

A growing body of research suggests that self-control is akin to a muscle that can be strengthened through practice. In other words, self-control abilities are malleable, a fact that can be a source of hope for those who struggle with this skill. In psychotherapy, treatment for impulse-control issues often involves teaching individuals to realize the downsides of acting on immediate urges and in turn to practice delaying gratification. In anxiety disorders, this process occurs through exposure to a feared situation – which is very uncomfortable at first, but eventually becomes tolerable and even trains a person's mind and body that these situations are less threatening than originally feared. Exposure therapy is only effective if an individual can delay gratification and resist the urge to escape the situation early on. To shed insight on the tradeoff between short- and long-term gains, therapists might also help individuals construct a pro-con list of a certain behavior, with sections for short-term and long-term outcomes. For maladaptive coping behaviors such as self-injury, substance use or avoidance, there are generally no long-term pros. Meanwhile, abstinence from acting on a harmful urge (i.e., delayed gratification) generally results in long-term benefits. This realization can be a powerful impetus for change.

===== Externalizing disorders =====
Externalizing disorders (i.e., acting-out disorders) show a clearer link to delayed gratification, since they more directly involve deficits in impulse control. For example, attention deficit hyperactivity disorder (ADHD) and aggressive behavior are associated with difficulty delaying gratification in children and adolescents, as are substance abuse, gambling, and other addictive behaviors in adolescents and adults. In a 2010 study, teenagers and young adults with stronger abilities to delay gratification were less likely to drink alcohol, or to smoke cigarettes or cannabis. A 2011 study found that the contrast in delayed gratification between children with and without ADHD was no longer significant after statistically controlling for IQ (in other words, ADHD was not associated with delayed gratification above and beyond the influence of IQ). This may stem from the high correlation between intelligence and delayed gratification, and suggests that the tie between delayed gratification and ADHD could benefit from more investigation.

===== Internalizing disorders =====
Difficulty delaying gratification also plays a role in internalizing disorders like anxiety and depression. A hallmark behavior in anxiety is avoidance of feared or anxiety-provoking situations. By seeking the immediate relief that comes with avoidance, a person is succumbing to the pull of instant gratification over the larger reward from overcoming the fear and anxiety that caused the avoidance. Procrastination, which is often a reflection of anxiety, is a clear example: a person avoids a dreaded task by engaging in a more enjoyable immediate activity instead. Obsessive–compulsive disorder (OCD) is a more jarring case of this anxiety-related struggle to delay gratification; someone with OCD may be unable to resist compulsions that temporarily mitigate the torture of obsessive thoughts, even though these compulsions do not banish the obsessions in the long run. One experiment, however, did not find any significant differences between samples with OCD and healthy controls in delayed gratification, while finding substantially improved delayed gratification among those with obsessive–compulsive personality disorder. Depression is also associated with lower capacity to delay gratification, though the direction of cause and effect is not clear. A depressed person who has difficulty pushing themself to engage in previously enjoyed activities is (deliberately or not) prioritizing short-term comfort and is demonstrating an impaired ability to delay gratification. There is evidence that individuals who engage in deliberate self-harm (e.g. cut themselves) are less able to tolerate emotional distress but are more able to tolerate physical pain. Thus it is argued that they injure themselves because they cannot delay gratification and need a way to end emotional pain quickly.

==== Psychoanalytic drives and impulses ====
Sigmund Freud viewed the struggle to delay gratification as a person's efforts to overcome the instinctive, libidinal drive of the id. According to classic psychoanalytic theory, a person's psyche is composed of the id, ego and superego. The id is driven by the pleasure principle: it wants physical pleasure, and it wants it now. The ego, operating under the reality principle, serves to moderate the id's desire for instant gratification against the superego, which is guided by a person's internalized sense of morality. According to psychoanalytic theory, a person with difficulty delaying gratification is plagued by intrapsychic conflict – the ego cannot adequately regulate the battle between the id and the superego – and experiences psychological distress, often in the form of anxiety or "neurosis".

Other psychoanalytic researchers describe a more nuanced, and less universally positive, view of delayed gratification. David C. Funder and Jack Block theorized that a person's tendency to delay, or not delay, gratification is just one element of a broader construct called ego control, defined as a person's ability to modulate or control impulses. Ego control "ranges from ego undercontrol at one end to ego overcontrol at the other", according to Funder. These tendencies are thought to be relatively stable in each individual, such that someone who tends toward undercontrol will "grab whatever rewards are immediately available even at the cost of long-term gain" and someone who tends toward overcontrol will "delay or even forgo pleasures even when they can be had without cost". By this view, delay of gratification may be adaptive in certain settings, but inappropriate or even costly in other settings.

Funder and Block draw a distinction between the ego-control model, in which delayed gratification is seen as a general tendency to contain motivational impulses (whether or not it is adaptive in a specific instance), and the ego-resiliency model (supported by Mischel's research), in which delayed gratification is seen as a skill that arises only when it is adaptive. To tease apart these models, Funder and Block explored the association between ego control, ego resiliency, IQ and delayed gratification in adolescents. The adolescents had the choice between being paid $4 at each of six study sessions or delaying their payment until the last session, in which case they would also earn an additional $4 of "interest".

The results supported both models of delayed gratification. The teens' tendency to delay gratification was indeed associated with IQ and with ego resiliency (e.g., higher delayers were rated as more responsible, consistent, likable, sympathetic, generous; less hostile, moody, self-indulgent, rebellious), but was also independently associated with ego control (e.g., higher delayers were rated as "tends toward over-control of needs and impulses" and "favors conservative values in a number of areas"). The researchers noted that individual differences in ego control (i.e., overall impulsivity) may play a larger role in delayed gratification when the incentives are larger and more motivating.

Writing in 1998, Funder described delayed gratification as a "mixed bag". He concluded: "Participants who exhibited the most delay were not just 'better' at self-control, but in a sense they seemed unable to avoid it. ... Delayers are in general smart and well-adjusted, but they also tend to be somewhat overcontrolled and unnecessarily inhibited."

=== Environmental and social factors ===
==== Who is in control ====
Factors affecting one's ability to delay gratification depend on whether the delay contingency is self-imposed (delay can be terminated at the will of the person waiting) or externally imposed by another person, institution or circumstance. When the contingency is self-imposed, the physical presence of the reward seems to aid in delaying gratification. On the other hand, when the delay is externally imposed, children are not able to wait as long when the reward is present, suggesting greater frustration under these circumstances.

==== Task engagement ====
Engaging in work or an assigned task can generate an effective distraction from a reward and enable a person to wait for a longer delay, as long as the reward is not being flaunted. Having the reward present during work (and easily accessible) creates a negative frustration—akin to teasing—rather than providing motivation. For example, a child who can see other children playing outside while the child is finishing their homework will be less motivated to wait for their turn for recess. Another factor work and task engagement adds to the delay of gratification is that if the work is interesting and has some reinforcing quality inherent to it, then attention to the reward will reduce work productivity since it becomes a distraction to the work rather than a motivation to finish it.

==== Mother–child relationship ====
The more positive emotions and behavior that a 12- to 24-month-old toddler displays when coping with separation from a parent, the better they are 3.5 years later at using cooling strategies in order to defer gratification. This suggests that the emotional skills and processes required for coping with social and interpersonal frustrations are similar to those utilized for coping with the aggravation of goal-directed delay of gratification. Maternal attachment also influences the development of a child's ability to delay gratification. An interaction has been found between a mother's level of control and how close a child stays to the mother while exploring the environment.

Children who have controlling mothers and explore their environment at a far distance from her are able to employ more cooling strategies and prefer rewards that come later. Similarly, children who stay close to a non-controlling mothers also use more cool strategies and demonstrate longer delays. This suggests that some children of controlling mothers have better learned how to distract themselves from or effectively avoid intrusive stimuli, although additional effects on their emotional competency are speculated but unknown. A greater capacity to delay gratification by using effective attentional strategies is also seen in preschoolers whose mothers had been responsive and supportive during particularly stressful times of self-regulation when the child was a toddler, indicating that maternal responsiveness during highly demanding times is crucial for the development of self-regulation, self-control and emotional competency.

==== Reliability of gratification ====
Researchers have investigated whether the reliability of the reward affects one's ability to delay gratification. Reliability of the reward refers to how well the reward received matches what the person was expecting or promised in terms of quality and quantity. For example, researchers told children that they would receive better art supplies if they waited. After the children successfully waited for the reward, better supplies could not be "found" and so they had to use the crayons and stickers that were in poor shape. Comparing these children to ones who received their promised rewards reliably revealed different results on subsequent Marshmallow tests measuring delayed gratification. Children who had learned that the researcher's promise was unreliable quickly succumbed to eating the marshmallow, waiting only an average of three minutes. Conversely, children who had learned that the researcher was reliable were able to wait an average of 12 minutes, with many of them waiting the full 15 minutes for the researcher to return in order to double the reward to two marshmallows.

=== Genetics and evolution ===
Evolutionary theory can argue against the selection of the deferred gratification trait since there are both costs and risks associated with delaying gratification behavior. One such cost is the basic opportunity cost associated with time spent waiting. While waiting, individuals lose time that could be used to find other food. Seeking high calorie food conveys a clear evolutionary advantage. There are also two risks associated with being patient. First, there is a risk that another animal might get to the food first, also known as an interruption risk. Second, there is the risk that the chance to get the reward will be cut short, perhaps by a predator, also known as a termination risk. These costs and risks create situations in which the fitness of the individual is threatened. There are several examples that show how reward delay occurs in the real world. For example, animals that eat fruit have the option of eating unripe fruit right away, or waiting, delaying gratification, until it becomes ripe. The interruption risk plays a part here, because if the individual forgoes the unripe fruit, there is a chance that another individual may come along and get to it first. Also, in extractive foraging, such as with nuts and shellfish, the outer shell creates a delay. However, animals that can store food and defer eating are more likely to survive during harsh conditions, and thus delaying gratification may also incur an evolutionary advantage.

It is likely that there is a strong genetic component to deferred gratification, though no direct link has been established. Since many complex genetic interactions are necessary for neurons to perform the simplest tasks, it is hard to isolate one gene to study this behavior. For this same reason, multiple genes are likely responsible for deferred gratification. Further research is necessary to discover the genetic corollaries to delayed gratification.

== Animal studies ==
Delayed gratification or deferred gratification is an animal behavior that can be linked to delay discounting, ecological factors, individual fitness, and neurobiological mechanisms. Research for this behavior has been conducted with animals such as capuchin monkeys, tamarins, marmosets, rats, and pigeons.

=== Delay discounting ===
When animals are faced with a choice to either wait for a reward, or receive a reward right away, the discounting of the reward is hyperbolic. As the length of time of waiting for a reward increases, the reward is discounted at a gradual rate. Empirical data have suggested that exponential discounting, rewards discounting at a constant rate per unit of waiting time, only occurs when there are random interruptions in foraging. Discounting can also be related to the risk sensitivity of animals. Rather than relating risk to delay, risk sensitivity acts as a function of delay discounting.

In a study conducted by Haden and Platt, macaque monkeys were given the choice of a medium reward that they knew they would receive, versus a more risky choice. The riskier choice would reward the monkey with a large reward fifty percent of the time, and a small reward the other fifty percent. The ultimate payoff was the same, but the monkeys preferred the riskier choice. They speculated that the monkeys did not see their action as risky, but rather as a large, delayed reward. They reasoned that the monkeys viewed the large reward as certain: if they did not get the large reward the first time around, they would eventually get it, but at a longer delay.

To test for this theory, they gave the same test while varying the time between the opportunities to choose a reward. They found that as the interval increased, the number of times that the monkeys chose the more risky reward decreased. While this occurred in macaque monkeys, the varying interval time did not affect pigeons' choices in another study. This suggests that research looking into varying risk sensitivity of different species is needed. When provided a choice between a small, short delay reward, and a large, long delay reward, there is an impulsive preference for the former. Additionally, as the delay time for the small/short and large/long reward increases, there is a shift in preference toward the larger, delayed reward. This evidence only supports hyperbolic discounting, not exponential.

=== Ecological factors ===
Although predicting reward preference seems simple when using empirical models, there are a number of ecological factors that seem to affect the delayed gratification behavior of animals. In real world situations, "discounting makes sense because of the inherent uncertainty of future payoffs".

One study looked at how reward discounting is context specific. By differing the time and space between small and large rewards, they were able to test how these factors affected the decision making in tamarins and marmosets. They showed that tamarins will travel longer distances for larger food rewards, but will not wait as long as marmosets. Conversely, marmosets will wait longer, but will not travel as far. They then concluded that this discounting behavior directly correlates to the normal feeding behavior of species. The tamarins feed over large distances, looking for insects. Capturing and eating insects requires a quick and impulsive decision and action. The marmosets, on the other hand, eat tree sap, which takes more time to secrete, but does not require that the marmosets to cover large distances.

The physiological similarities between humans and other animals, especially primates, have led to more comparative research between the two groups.

== See also ==
- Time preference – the economic analysis of delayed gratification preferences
