= Cognitive-affective personality system =

Model within psychology of personality

- Cognitive-Affective Processing System
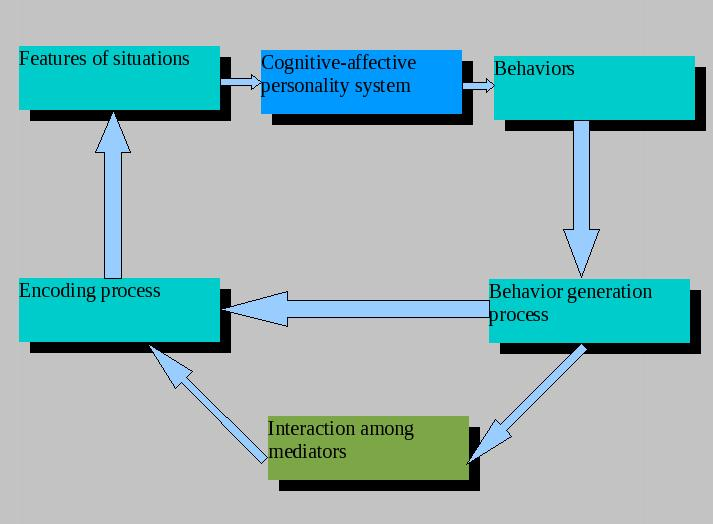
- Concepts; Cognitive-affective unit Self-perception; Situation; Person-situation interaction Proponents; Walter Mischel; Yuichi Shoda Relevant works A cognitive-affective system theory of personality

The cognitive-affective personality system or cognitive-affective processing system (CAPS) is a contribution to the psychology of personality proposed by Walter Mischel and Yuichi Shoda in 1995. According to the cognitive-affective model, behavior is best predicted from a comprehensive understanding of the person, the situation, and the interaction between person and situation.

== Description ==
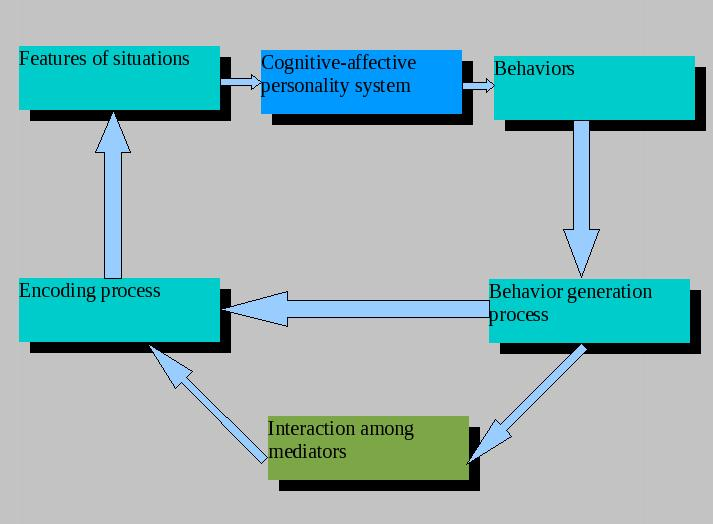
Cognitive-Affective Processing System

Cognitive-affective theorists argue that behavior is not the result of some global personality trait; instead, it arises from individuals' perceptions of themselves in a particular situation. However, inconsistencies in behavior are not due solely to the situation; inconsistent behaviors reflect stable patterns of variation within the person. These stable variations in behavior present themselves in the following framework: If A, then X; but if B, then Y. People's pattern of variability is the behavioral signature of their personality, or their stable pattern of behaving differently in various situations. According to this model, personality depends on situation variables, and consists of cognitive-affective units (all those psychological, social, and physiological aspects of people that allow them to interact with their environment in a relatively stable manner).

The authors identified five cognitive-affective units:

- encoding strategies, or people's individualized manner of categorizing information from external stimuli;
- competencies and self-regulatory strategies: intelligence, self-regulatory strategies, self-formulated goals, and self-produced consequences;
- expectancies and beliefs, or people's predictions about the consequences of each of the different behavioral possibilities;
- goals and values, which provide behavior consistency;
- affective responses, including emotions, feelings, and the affects accompanying physiological reactions.

== Evaluation ==
The cognitive-affective processing system theory attempts to explain seemingly conflicting evidence -- personality remains relatively invariant over time and throughout different social contexts, whereas social behaviors vary substantially across different situations. The theory integrates concepts of personality structure and dynamics, obviating the need for two subdisciplines in personality psychology, each with different and sometimes conflicting goals (i.e. personality dispositions or personality processes).

== See also ==
- Biospheric model of personality
- Hypostatic model of personality
- Personality systematics
- Systems psychology
