= Andras Angyal =

American psychiatrist (1902–1960)

Andras Angyal (1902 – 1960) was a Hungarian-American psychiatrist, known for a holistic model for a theory of personality.

== Early life and education ==
Angyal was born in 1902, in Transylvania (then Hungary), Angyal received his Ph.D. from the University of Vienna in 1927 and his M.D. from the University of Turin in 1932.

He emigrated to the United States in 1932 and became a Rockefeller Fellow in the Department of Anthropology at Yale University. He moved to Worcester State Hospital in Massachusetts as a psychiatrist in the research unit, becoming Director of Research from 1937 to 1945. From 1945 until his death in 1960, he was in private practice in Boston.

His 1939 work on "The Structure of Wholes" was seen as a precedent to systems theory in books in the 1960s–1980s edited by Fred Emery. Angyal's biospheric model of personality was found to have greater generality beyond the domain of personality, to a broader range of systems.

Angyal ... coined the word biosphere. The word refers to both the individual and the environment, "not as interacting parts, not as constituents which have independent existence, but as aspects of a single reality which can be separated only by abstraction". [...]

The biosphere is seen as a system of interlocking systems so arranged that any given sub-system of the biosphere is both the container of lesser systems and the container of a greater system or systems. The interplay of the interlocking systems creates a tension which gives rise to the energy, which is available to the personality. Moreover, the biosphere as a whole is characterized by a fundamental polarity which gives rise to its most fundamental energy. This polarity arises from the fact that the environment pulls in one direction and the organism in the other.

To these fundamental yet opposed pulls of the biosphere, Angyal has given the names of autonomy and homonomy, respectively. Autonomy is the relatively egoistic pole of the biosphere: it represents the tendency to advance one's interests by mastering the environment, by asserting oneself, so to speak, as a separate being. Homonomy is the relatively 'selfless' pole of the biosphere: it is the tendency to fit oneself to the environment by willingly subordinating oneself to something that one perceives as larger than the individual self. In place of the words autonomy and homonomy, Angyal has also used the terms self-determination and self-surrender to describe these opposing yet co-operating directional trends of the biosphere, and he has felicitously summed up the individual's relationship to them with the remark that, "the human being comports himself as if he were a whole of an intermediate order".

== Selected works ==
- Angyal, Andras (1969). "A logic of systems". In Emery, Frederick Edmund (ed.). Systems thinking: selected readings. Penguin modern management readings; Penguin education. Vol. 71. Harmondsworth, UK: Penguin. pp. 17–29. ISBN 0140800719. OCLC 66172.
- Angyal, Andras; Hanfmann, Eugenia; Jones, Richard M. (1965). Neurosis and treatment: a holistic theory. New York: John Wiley & Sons. OCLC 1175528.
- Angyal, Andras (September 1951). "A theoretical model for personality studies". Journal of Personality. 20 (1): 131–142. doi:10.1111/j.1467-6494.1951.tb01517.x. PMID 14898435.
- Angyal, Andras (1972) [1941]. Foundations for a science of personality. A Viking compass book. New York: Viking Press. ISBN 0670003557. OCLC 515536.
- Angyal, Andras (July 1941). "Disgust and related aversions". Journal of Abnormal and Social Psychology. 36 (3): 393–412. doi:10.1037/h0058254.
- Angyal, Andras (January 1939). "The structure of wholes". Philosophy of Science. 6 (1): 25–37. doi:10.1086/286531. JSTOR 184329. S2CID 120434457.
- Angyal, Andras (May 1936). "The experience of the body-self in schizophrenia". Archives of Neurology & Psychiatry. 35 (5): 1029–1053. doi:10.1001/archneurpsyc.1936.02260050103007.
