= Yuichi Shoda =

Japanese-born psychologist and academic

- Known for: Cognitive-affective personality system
- Scientific career
- Fields: Psychology
- Institutions: University of Washington

Yuichi Shoda (Japanese: 正田佑一) is a Japanese-born psychologist and academic who contributed to the development of the cognitive-affective personality system theory of personality.

== Biography ==
Shoda was born and grew up in Japan. He studied physics and geophysics at Hokkaido University in Sapporo. After attending the University of California, Santa Cruz, he started graduate school in psychology at Stanford, and finished at Columbia University with a PhD degree in psychology in 1990. He joined the University of Washington in 1996.

In 1995 he co-authored with Walter Mischel a paper presenting the "cognitive-affective system theory of personality", stating that people's behavior changes across situations, but behind the change, something important about the person is unchanged. These relatively unchanging qualities include the person's "meaning system", including the categories and concepts through which she or he experiences the social world, and the belief and value networks that guide responses to specific social situations. This could be considered a form of "higher order" stability, analogous to the notion of "higher order" invariants in mathematics. These personal qualities are reflected in the person's "behavioral signature," the set of if (situation) then (behavior) patterns that characterize each person.

Throughout his career, Shoda’s work focused on improving the methods and practice of behavioral science. He co-developed the “null regions” framework for statistical inference to solve the persistent problems of the traditional null hypothesis significance testing (NHST) that has been a mainstay of statistical inference for almost a century, proposed that Constraints of Generality (COG) be explicitly stated in all empirical papers, and developed the Highly Repeated Within Person (HRWP) methodology to identify within-person effects and person-to-person differences in such effects without needing to first identify relevant individual difference variables. From 2012 to 2015, Shoda served as an Associate Editor of Social Psychological and Personality Science, and from 2016 to 2020, he served as an Associate Editor of Journal of Personality and Social Psychology. In 2022, he co-founded the Equity in Open Scholarship initiative.

== Selected works ==
- Smiley, A. H., Glazier, J. J., & Shoda, Y. (2023). Null regions: a unified conceptual framework for statistical inference. Royal Society Open Science, 10(11), 221328. https://doi.org/10.1098/rsos.221328
- Brady*, L. M., Fryberg, S. A., & Shoda, Y. (2018). Expanding the interpretive power of psychological science by attending to culture. PNAS Proceedings of the National Academy of Sciences of the United States of America, 115, 11406–11413. https://doi.org/10.1073/pnas.1803526115.
- Simons, D. J., Shoda, Y., & Lindsay, D. S. (2017). Constraints on Generality (COG): A Proposed Addition to All Empirical Papers. Perspectives on Psychological Science, 12(6), 1123-1128. https://doi.org/10.1177/1745691617708630.
- Zhu, J., Cai, H., Shoda, Y.; How Often Are Constraints on Generality (COGs) Discussed? A Look at Articles Published in Four Psychology Journals 2018-2022. Collabra: Psychology 2 January 2025; 11 (1): 128652. doi: https://doi.org/10.1525/collabra.128652
- Whitsett, D. D., & Shoda, Y. ( 2014 ). Examining the Heterogeneity of the Effects of Situations across Individuals Does Not Require A Priori Identification and Measurement of Individual Difference Variables . Journal of Experimental Social Psychology, 50, 94 - 104. https://doi.org/10.1016/j.jesp.2013.08.008.
- Shoda, Y., Wilson, N. L., Whitsett, D. D., Lee - Dussud, J., & Zayas, V. ( 2014 ). The Person as a Cognitive - Affective Processing System: From Quantitative Idiography to Cumulative Science. In M. L. Cooper & R. J. Larsen (Eds.), Handbook of Personality Processes and Individual Differences. Washington, DC, APA Press. pp. 491 - 513.
- Shoda, Y., Wilson, N. L., Chen, A., Gilmore, A., & Smith, R. E. ( 2013 ). Cognitive - Affective Processing System Analysis of Intra - individual Dynamics in Collaborative Therapeutic Assessment: Translating Basic Theory and Research into Clinical Applications. Journal of Personality, 81, 554 - 568.
- Wang, J., Leu, J., & Shoda, Y. (2011). When the Seemingly Innocuous “Stings”: Racial Microaggressions and Their Emotional Consequences. Personality and Social Psychology Bulletin, 37(12), 1666-1678. https://doi.org/10.1177/0146167211416130.
- Shoda, Y. (2007). Computational modeling of personality as a dynamical system. Handbook of research methods in personality psychology, 633-651.
- Shoda, Y., Cervone, D., & Downey, G. (Eds.) (2007). Persons in context: Building a science of the individual. New York: Guilford Press.
- Shoda, Y., & Mischel, W. (2000). Reconciling contextualism with the core assumptions of personality psychology. European Journal of Personality, 14, 407–428.
- Cervone, D., & Shoda, Y. (Eds.) (1999). The coherence of personality: Social-cognitive bases of personality consistency, variability, and organization. NY: Guilford.
- Shoda, Y. (1999). A unified framework for the study of behavioral consistency: Bridging person× situation interaction and the consistency paradox. European Journal of Personality, 13(5), 361-387.
- Shoda, Y., & Mischel, W. (1993). Cognitive social approach to dispositional inferences: What if the perceiver is a cognitive-social theorist? Personality and Social Psychology Bulletin, 19, 574–585.
- Shoda, Y., Mischel, W., & Wright, J. C. (1993). Links between personality judgments and contextualized behavior patterns: Situation-behavior profiles of personality prototypes. Social Cognition, 4, 399–429.
- Shoda, Y., Mischel, W., & Peake, P. K. (1990). Predicting adolescent cognitive and social competence from preschool delay of gratification: Identifying diagnostic conditions. Developmental Psychology, 26, 978–986.

== Awards ==
Shoda is a recipient of the Golden Goose Award and the dissertation award from the Society of Experimental Social Psychology.
