= Personality systematics =

Personality systematics is a contribution to the psychology of personality and to psychotherapy summarized by Jeffrey J. Magnavita in 2006 and 2009. It is the study of the interrelationships among subsystems of personality as they are embedded in the entire ecological system. The model falls into the category of complex, biopsychosocial approaches to personality. The term personality systematics was originally coined by William Grant Dahlstrom in 1972.

== Historical background ==
Systems psychology has emerged here as a new approach in which groups and individuals, are considered as systems in homeostasis. Within open systems they have an active method of remaining stable through the dynamic relationship between parts. A classic example of this homeostatic dynamic is the "problem behavior" of a bed wetting child having a stabilizing function of holding a troubled marriage together because the attention of the parents is drawn away from their conflict towards the "problem" child.

More recent developments in systems psychology have challenged this understanding of homeostasis as being too focused on causal understanding of systems. This change in thought from 1st order cybernetics to 2nd order cybernetics involved a postmodern shift in understanding of reality as objective to being socially and linguistically constructed.

Family systems therapy received an important boost in the mid-1950s through the work of anthropologist Gregory Bateson and colleagues – Jay Haley, Donald D. Jackson, John Weakland, William Fry, and later, Virginia Satir, Paul Watzlawick and others – at Palo Alto in the US, who introduced ideas from cybernetics and general systems theory into social psychology and psychotherapy, focusing in particular on the role of communication. This approach eschewed the traditional focus on individual psychology and historical factors – that involve so-called linear causation and content – and emphasized instead feedback and homeostatic mechanisms and “rules” in here-and-now interactions – so-called circular causation and process – that were thought to maintain or exacerbate problems, whatever the original cause(s).

Relational psychoanalysis began in the 1980s as an attempt to integrate interpersonal psychoanalysis's emphasis on the detailed exploration of interpersonal interactions with British object relations theory's sophisticated ideas about the psychological importance of internalized relationships with other people. Relationalists argue that personality emerges from the matrix of early formative relationships with parents and other figures. Philosophically, relational psychoanalysis is closely allied with social constructionism.

== Description ==
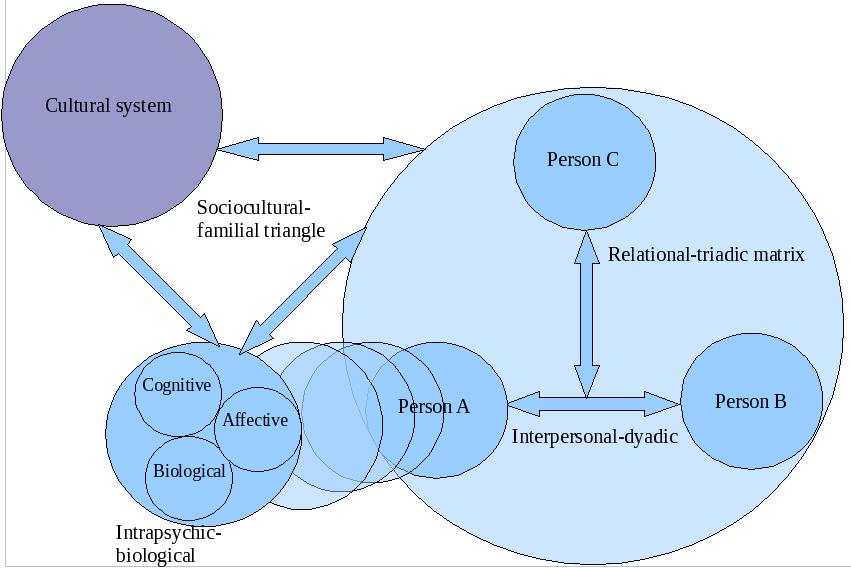
Personality systematics

Personality systematics seeks to establish the underlying processes within the domains of the larger system. The domains range from what can be observed from the microlevel to the macrolevel domains.

Personality can be conceptualized as an emergent phenomena of the convergent forces and their expressions which can be compared to a holographic representation. Personality systematics is based on a holistic model of functioning which considers part-whole relationships as being essential to understanding complex self-organizing systems.

The model describes four levels of the personality system:

- Level I, intrapsychic-biological, including cognitive and affective experiences;
- Level II, interpersonal-dyadic (the two-person system), regulating the tension between intimacy and separateness, and including past, current, and expected relationships;
- Level III, relational-triadic matrix, representing the relations among a primary dyad and a third person;
- Level IV, sociocultural familial triangle, depicting the synergy between the individual personality system, the family system, and the cultural system, and shaping how genetic predispositions and vulnerabilities will be expressed.

== Applications in treatment ==
This model has been used in treating complex clinical syndromes, personality dysfunction, and relational disturbances. To enhance efficacy and range, new methods are used, such as audiovisual recording and physiological measurements, galvanic skin response, heart rate variability, and other forms of bio- and neuro-feedback.

== See also ==
- Hypostatic model of personality
- Cognitive-affective personality system
- Systems psychology
- Systemic therapy
