= Hypostatic model of personality =

View that people present themselves in different aspects

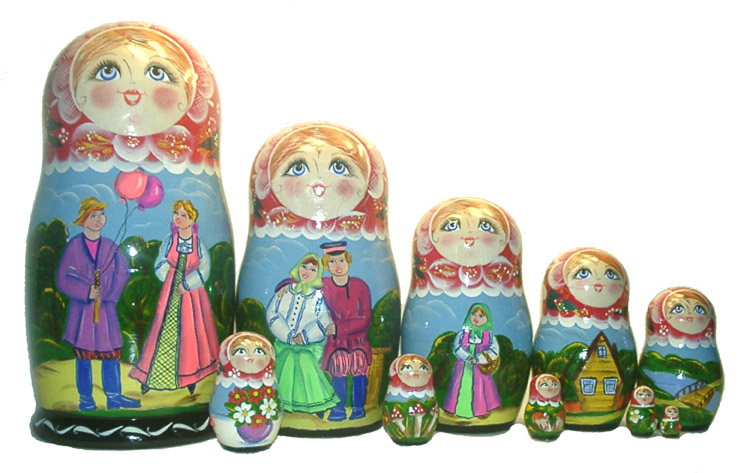
Matryoshka dolls provide a visual representation of the multiplicity and complexity of personality.

The hypostatic model of personality is a view asserting that humans present themselves in many different aspects or hypostases, depending on the internal and external realities they relate to, including different approaches to the study of personality. It is both a dimensional model and an aspect theory, in the sense of the concept of plurality. The model falls into the category of complex, biopsychosocial approaches to personality.

The term hypostasis can cover a wide range of personality-related entities usually known as type, stage, trait, system, approach. The history of the concept can be traced back to Peirce's hypostatic abstraction, or personification of traits. Different authors have described various dimensions of the self (or selves), personality dimensions and subpersonalities. Contemporary studies link different aspects of personality to specific biological, social, and environmental factors.

The work on subpersonalities was integrated into a hypostatic model. The model describes personality aspects and dimensions, as well as intra- and interpersonal relations. Not the person whole and alone, nor the relationship, but the relation between parts of person(s) is held as a central element that promotes both personal and social organization and disorganization. Personality is viewed as both an agency and a construction, along with its development and psychopathology, as the model is accompanied by specific methods of assessment and therapy, addressing each of the personality dimensions. The hypostatic relations of the human mind also imply the existence of a hypostatic model of consciousness, representing the contents of consciousness as an identity of various aspects, different only with respect to each other, but tending to coincide in a certain aspect of their consideration.

== Overview ==
The hypostatic model of personality is a way of viewing the many sides of a person's character. The model states that a person can behave and appear to others in many ways, depending on how that person is, but also on how that person is viewed by the others (scientists included). It also states that people are not one-sided, but are a little bit of everything. For example, today someone can be mean, and tomorrow they can be good. How people are and present themselves at one moment or another also depends on their biological state, and the situation or environment (the people and things around them). For example, sometimes the most cowardly person may become the greatest hero, if they are called to save someone's life.

In order to be improved, all these "sides" of a person have first to be scientifically assessed.

== Historical background ==
=== Origins and terminology ===
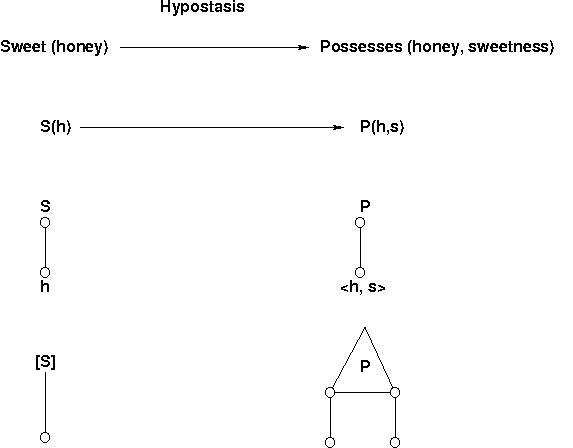
Hypostatic abstraction

The concept of hypostasis as the shared existence of spiritual and corporal entities has been used in a number of religious and intellectual settings. The word hypostasis means underlying state or underlying substance, and is the fundamental reality that supports all else.

The Neoplatonic philosopher Plotinus writes about three hypostases: Soul, Intellect (nous) and the One.

The Christian view of the Trinity is often described as a view of one God existing in three distinct hypostases.

In the Kabbalah, the ten sephirot are the hypostases of God, capable of being known, as opposed to his absolute essence, which is inaccessible to knowledge.

Charles Sanders Peirce introduced the concept of hypostatic abstraction, which is a formal operation that takes an element of information, such as might be expressed in a proposition of the form "X is Y", and conceives its information to consist in the relation between a subject and another subject, such as expressed in a proposition of the form "X has Y-ness".

Hypostatic ethics has been described as the study of values in themselves, with all their relations, as agents and/or influencers of cognition and behavior.

In linguistics, Leonard Bloomfield introduced the concept of hypostasis to describe the personification of an object or state in sentences as I'm tired of your buts and ifs.

Aaron Rosanoff's theory of personality distinguishes seven dimensions (normal, hysteroid, manic, depressive, autistic, paranoid, and epileptoid), which can be epistatic or hypostatic dimensions, the manifestation of the latter being concealed or inhibited by the former.

=== Variants and evolution: selves and dimensions ===
In the philosophy of mind, double-aspect theory is the view that the mental and the physical are two aspects of the same substance.

Selves according to William James

In his Principles of Psychology, William James describes four aspects of the self:

- Material self (the body and the person's closest possessions and relatives, including the family);
- Social self (the being-for-others);
- Spiritual self (the person's inner and subjective being, their psychic faculties and dispositions, taken concretely);
- The "pure" ego (the bare principle of personal unity).

Cognitive psychologist Ulric Neisser later described five "selves":

- Ecological self, as directly perceived with respect to the immediate physical environment;
- Interpersonal self, also directly perceived, established by specific emotional communication;
- Extended self, based on memory and anticipation;
- Private self (our private conscious experiences);
- Conceptual self, a system of socially-based assumptions and theories about human nature in general and ourselves in particular.

Carl Rogers distinguishes between the real self (the person as they are), and the ideal self (the person as the world told them they ought to be). Incongruence between these selves leads to feelings of anxiety.

Facet theory asserts that social-behavioral concepts are multivariate, and therefore they could be better described in terms of their "facets" and dimensions rather than as undifferentiated wholes; this can also be done using multidimensional scaling.

Hans Eysenck's three factor model of personality contains the independent dimensions of extraversion, neuroticism, and psychoticism; these different dimensions are caused by the properties of the brain, which themselves are the result of genetic factors.

The Minnesota Multiphasic Personality Inventory uses ten clinical scales measuring dimensions whose development and correlations in an individual determine their pathological tendencies.

The Big Five model describes five personality dimensions that affect the whole behavior, with each dimension having several facets. The Diagnostic and Statistical Manual of Mental Disorders used an axial (dimensional) and categorical system of diagnosis. DSM-IV takes into account five dimensions: mental state, global personality, physical condition, environment, and global functioning of the person.

=== Towards a contemporary integration ===
Differentiation between various mental states and behavior patterns on the basis of their relation with brain and social environment became commonplace in contemporary psychology and sociology.

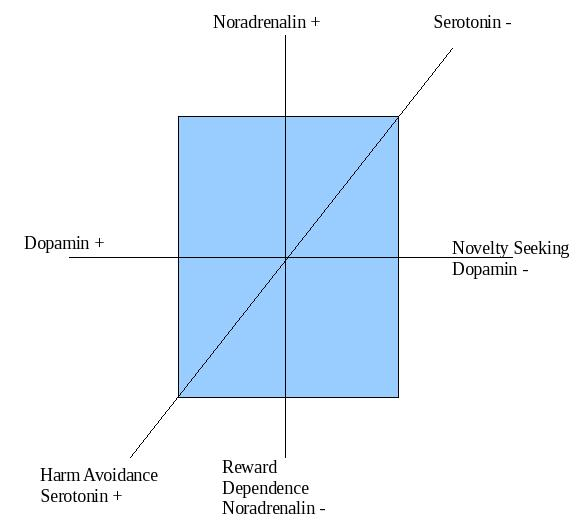
Cloninger's biological dimensions of personality

On the biopsychological side, functional MRI studies have shown that different behavioral and mental activities involve specific patterns of brain activation, corresponding to psychological states. C. Robert Cloninger defines three independent dimensions of personality, which are related to heritable variation in patterns of response to specific types of environmental stimuli; variation in each dimension is strongly correlated with activity in a specific central monoaminergic pathway:

- Novelty seeking, with frequent exploratory activity and intense excitement in response to novel stimuli, and with low basal dopaminergic activity;
- Harm avoidance, with intense responses to aversive stimuli and a tendency to learn to avoid punishment, novelty, and non-reward passively, and with high serotonergic activity;
- Reward dependence, with intense responses to reward and succorance and a tendency to learn to maintain rewarded behavior, and with low basal noradrenergic activity. These neurobiological dimensions interact to give rise to integrated patterns of differential responses to punishment, reward, and novelty.

Social roles according to role theory

On the social-environmental side, role theory defines the role as a set of connected behaviors, rights and obligations as conceptualized by actors in a social situation. Thus, roles can be:

- Cultural roles: roles given by culture (e.g. priest);
- Social differentiation: e.g. teacher, taxi driver;
- Situation-specific roles: e.g. eyewitness;
- Bio-sociological roles: e.g. as human in a natural system;
- Gender roles: as a man, woman, mother, father, etc.

Intersectionality is a methodology of studying "the relationships among multiple dimensions and modalities of social relationships and subject formations".

Roberto Assagioli uses the term "subpersonalities" for the social roles the person plays in different groups, roles that are mere "characters" played by the person, being different from their central inner Self.

As a core idea of his transactional analysis, Eric Berne asserts that there are at least three "persons" in each of us, calling them our "ego states": the Child (the emotional in us), the Adult (the rational in us), and the Parent (the authoritarian in us).

As functioning as a “society of mind”, the self is populated by a multiplicity of “self-positions” that have the possibility to entertain dialogical relationships with each other.

Internal Family Systems Model combines systems thinking with the view that mind is made up of relatively discrete subpersonalities each with its own viewpoint and qualities.

== Description ==
At a metatheoretical level, the hypostatic model argues that persons have several kinds of aspects, including, but not limited to:

- Adaptive aspects, pertaining to the internal organization of the person and the way they adapt to environments, including through actions and relations;
- Constitutive aspects – the ways in which personality is constituted within its relations with the organism and the external world;
- Temporal aspects, which represent the totality of forms that the person takes along the time line, short or long – including actions, states of consciousness, and developmental stages;
- Referential aspects, which are the ways the person is perceived by themself or by the others (including personality scientists and theorists);
- Integrative aspects – various combinations of the previous, which can be (or have been) the object of numerous research projects in psychology and related fields.

=== Organization of personality ===
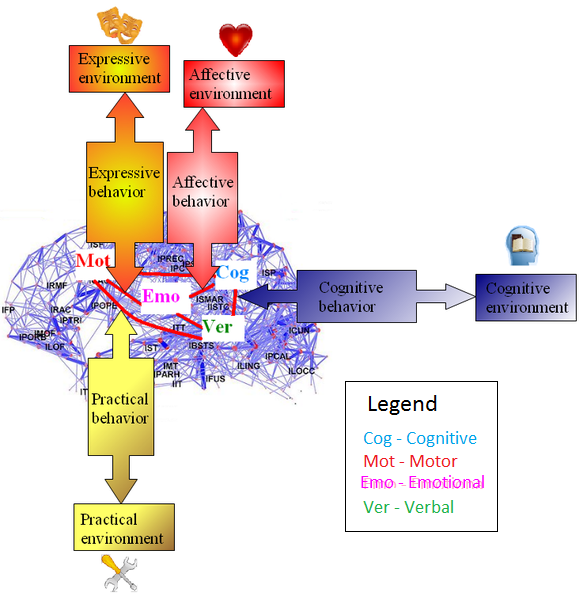
Personality: brain, behavior, environment.

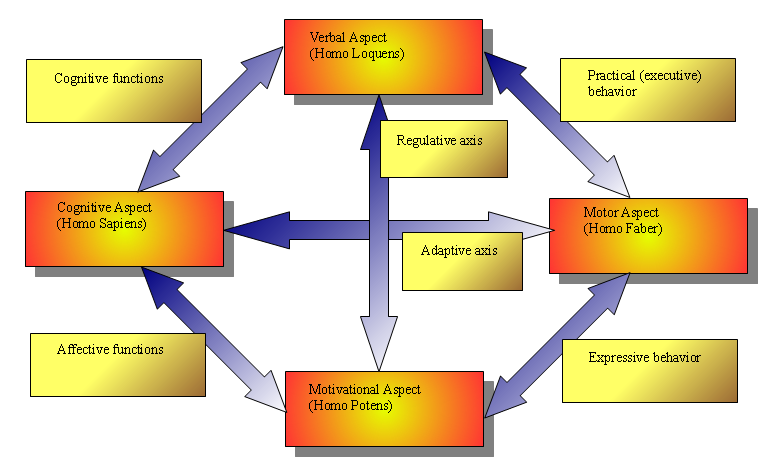
Personality components

Many schools of psychotherapy see subpersonalities as relatively enduring psychological structures or entities that influence how a person feels, perceives, behaves, and sees themself. According to the hypostatic model, human personality consists of four components or hypostases, which are patterns of behavior related to specific systems in the brain, and are conceptualized by virtually every culture as being characteristic and/or essential to humans:

- The basic cognitive component – "Homo sapiens" (the intelligent person), which is in connection with sensory areas of the cerebral cortex;
- The verbal subsystem – "Homo Loquens" (the speaking, communicating, and [self-]controlling person), which is connected with the activities of association areas;
- The emotional and motivational subsystem – "Homo Potens" (the powerful and energetic person), which is correlated with the activity of the limbic system;
- The pragmatic (motor) component – "Homo faber" (the productive and industrious person), which is linked to motor cortex activity.

One of these aspects can dominate the person, and lead to the development of – and adherence to – various philosophical views and schools:

- Cognitive-intuitive aspect focuses on concrete, immediate data, which are not subject of any kind of selection – it originated philosophical empiricism;
- Cognitive-intellectual aspect is only guided by reason; it leads to rationalism;
- Verbal aspect is dominated by all that is meaningful – it leads to philosophical nominalism;
- Emotional-hedonistic aspect views action as strictly limited to providing pleasure – it corresponds to philosophical hedonism;
- Emotional-idealistic aspect is dominated by superior motives of contributing to the world in accepted ways – it leads to stoicism;
- Pragmatic aspect values only things that facilitate practical action – it generates pragmatism.

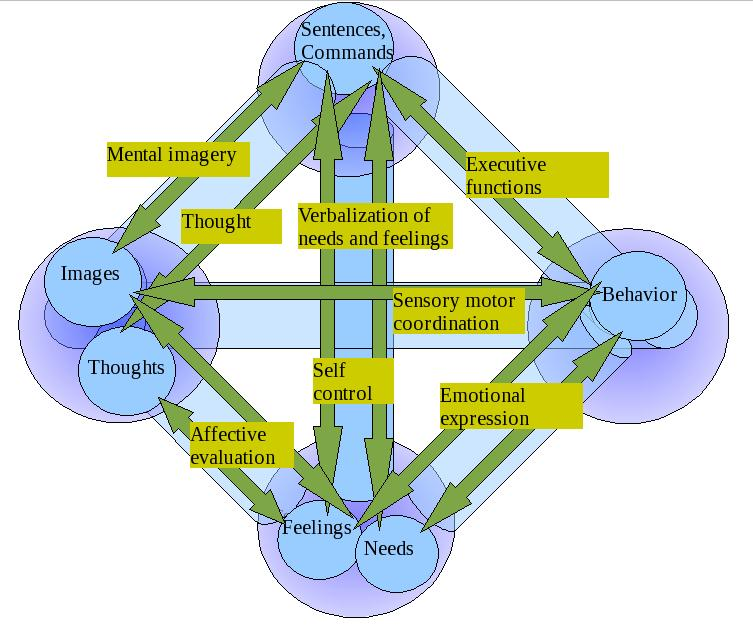
Personality and mental operations

Human behavior is generated through the interaction and coupling of these human aspects, creating personality dimensions. The six behavioral, mental, and personality dimensions are:

- Cognitive behavior, generated by cognitive and verbal aspects;
- Practical behavior, produced by verbal and motor components;
- Affective behavior, conducted by cognitive and motivational components;
- Expressive behavior, "co-worked" by motivational and motor components;
- Personality regulation, provided by verbal and motivational aspects, which form the regulative axis of personality;
- General perceptual–motor adaptation, performed by the cognitive component together with the motor component, which form the adaptive axis of personality.

These dimensions correspond to the following types of mental operations:

- Cognitive operations – production and verbalization of images and thoughts;
- Practical operations, pertaining to executive functions;
- Affective operations – affective evaluation of the world and self;
- Expressive operations (emotional expression);
- Regulative operations – verbalization of needs, motives and feelings, and self-control;
- Perceptual–motor adaptive operations (e.g., eye–hand coordination).

In every specific task of daily life, one of the first four dimensions (cognitive, practical, affective, or expressive) is dominant, being at the center of the experience, whereas the other three are subordinated to it. Regulative and adaptive dimensions are constantly acting as a background throughout the behavioral process.

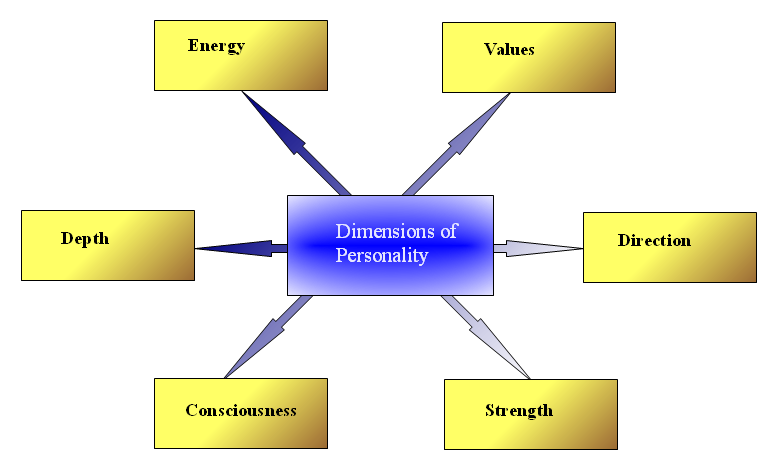
Personality dimensions

The six personality dimensions are described as follows:

- Consciousness is the level of mental (cognitive) development;
- Strength is the overall capacity of the person to change or influence their surroundings, which is distinct from the vital or mental energy that they express;
- Values are what is most important or valuable to a person, and they imply evaluating what is good vs. what is bad;
- Energy is a subjective measure of the strength or intensity of personality (the vital or mental energy that it expresses through behavior);
- Direction refers to the person's attitudes, motives, and intentions that regulate their behavior;
- Depth refers to the levels of complexity of behavior, ranging from simple reactions to complex adaptive patterns.

This is a composite view in which the six dimensions combine in complex ways to form "the web and woof of human personality". Within this view, the concrete, developing person may be represented as a point or a small three-dimensional object. Their trajectory for growth is to expand from that point in multiple dimensions to become a sphere, developing their four specific dimensions of knowledge, capacity, power, and enjoyment.

=== Personality as an agency and as a construction ===
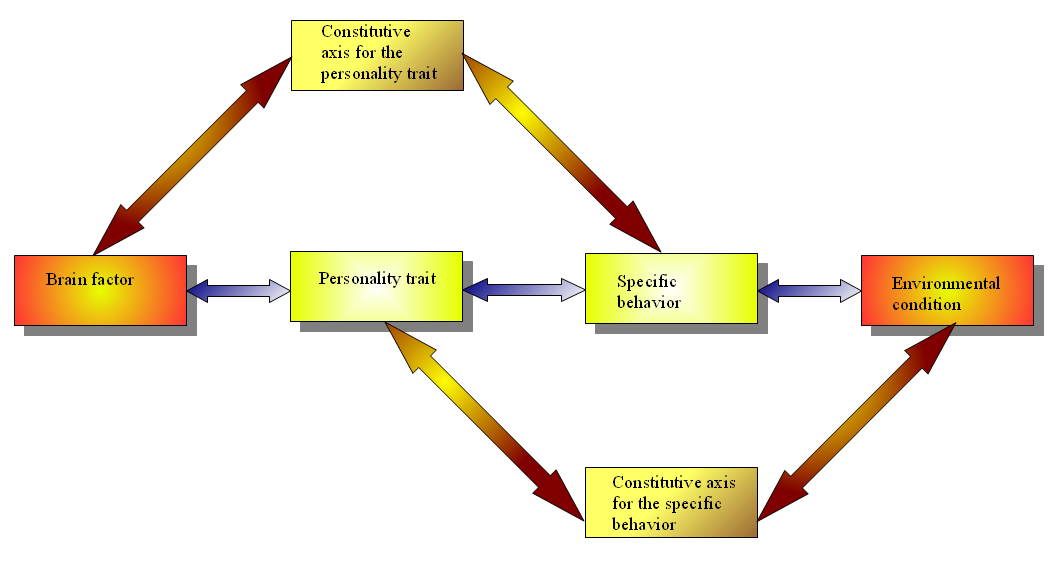
Personality and behavior according to the hypostatic model

In addition to this "doing" dimension of personality, there is also a "being made" dimension, including the constitutive axes – each one formed of a mental content (which can be cognitive, verbal, motivational, or pragmatic, depending on the personality aspect), a mental and behavioral activity related to it (which can be cognitive, practical, affective, expressive, regulative, or adaptive), and their brain and environmental correlates, respectively. Each constitutive axis consists of two couples: one formed by a brain factor and the corresponding behavior, shaping a mental (memory) content and structuring a "trait" or recurrent behavior, and the other one formed by that mental content and its environmental correlate, generating the specific behavior (functioning). For example, assertive behavior is determined by environmental factors and assertiveness, whereas assertiveness itself is the product of both brain predisposition and assertive behavior. An obsessive-compulsive individual maintains his obsessions (content) if often left alone with his predisposing brain and ritualistic behaviors. A shy person (trait) displays less shy behavior when in a familiar environment. This model provides a picture of the emergent relations between personality structuring, mental functioning (behavior), environment, and biology.

=== Cognitive and affective "paths": brain imaging data ===
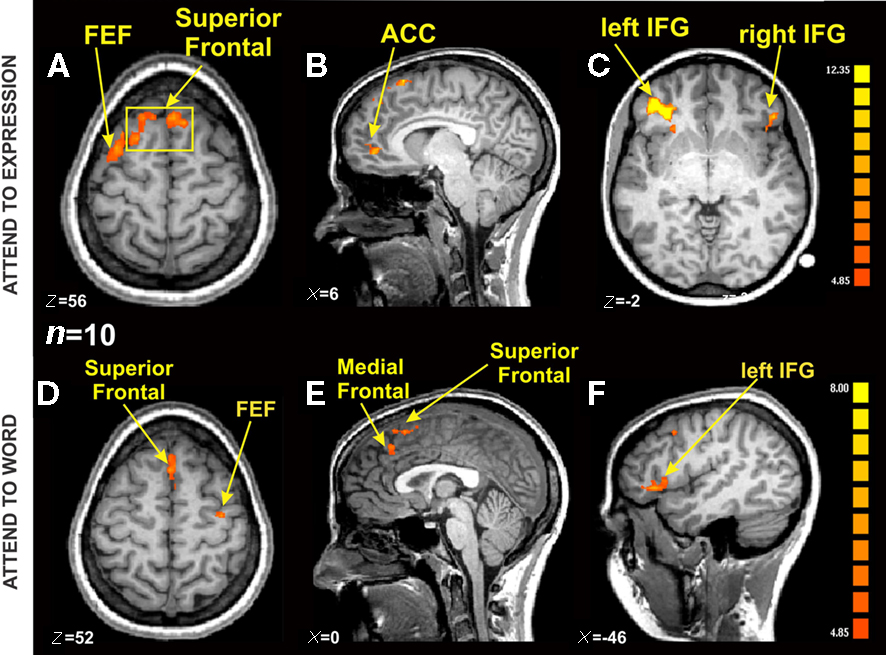
Different brain structures involved in the recognition of a word, and in the recognition of an emotional expression (functional MRI).

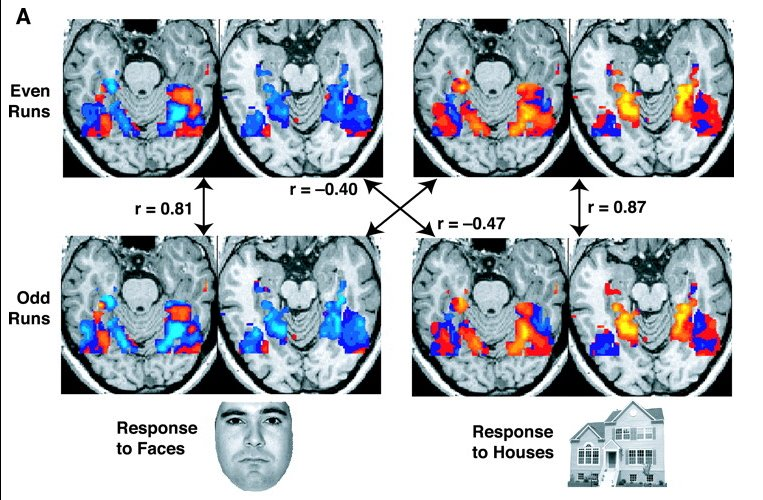
These fMRI images are from a study showing parts of the brain that respond to seeing houses and other parts to seeing faces. The 'r' values are correlations, with higher positive or negative values indicating a better match.

Magnetic resonance imaging (MRI) of the brain is a technique used in personality research. Displayed here is a brain MRI of a normal subject.

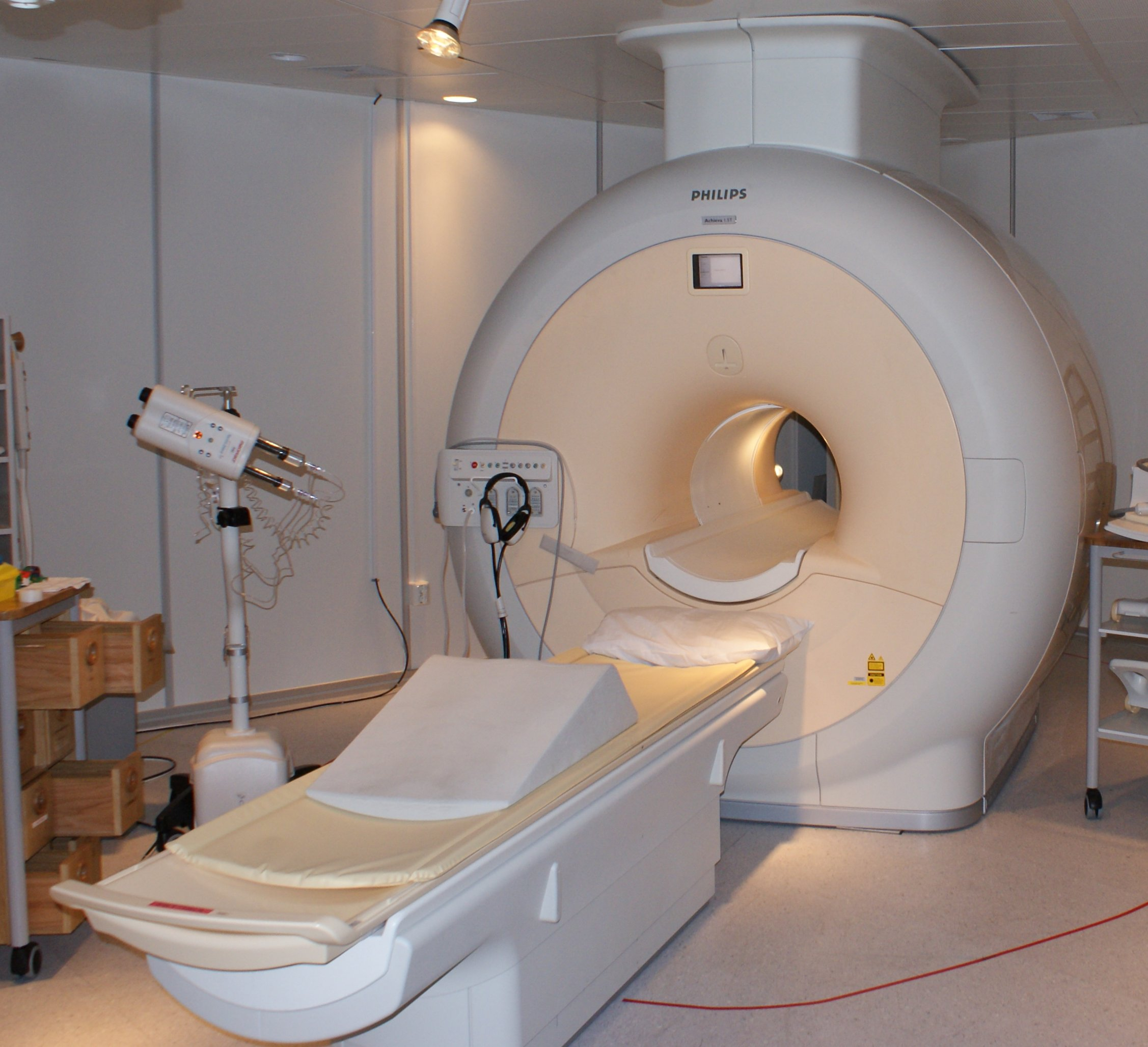
MRI equipment

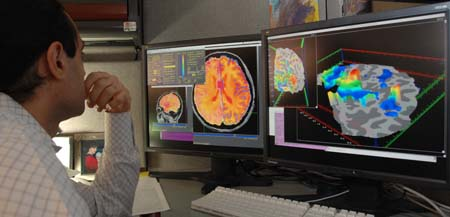
A researcher analyzing functional MRI images of the brain

Research using functional magnetic resonance imaging of the brain suggests that cognitive and affective-expressive forms of communication and self-reflection have distinct neural bases. Clinical findings have long suggested that verbalizations are often very incoherent when the individual is trying to put into words something deeply emotional. Identification of words naming emotions (happy, neutral, sad) was found to be faster than identification of corresponding facial expressions. Recognition of face expressions was more difficult to suppress in favor of the recognition of words than vice versa, the two conditions presenting different patterns of brain activation. These experimental results suggest that reading and recognition of face expressions are stimulus-dependent and perhaps hierarchical behaviors, hence recruiting distinct regions of the medial prefrontal cortex.

Research indicates that the representations of faces and objects in ventral temporal cortex are widely distributed and overlapping, face stimuli eliciting response patterns distinct from those elicited by object stimuli.

The phenomena that have been characterized clinically as “unconscious communication” may be defined systematically as emotional communication, which occurs both within and outside of awareness.

Research suggested that the fundamental mechanism at the basis of the experiential understanding of others’ actions is the activation of the mirror neuron system. A similar mechanism, but involving the activation of viscero-motor centers, underlies the experiential understanding of the emotions of others.

Activation of mirror neurons in a task relying on empathic abilities without explicit task-related motor components supports the view that mirror neurons are not only involved in motor cognition but also in emotional interpersonal cognition.

Evidence suggests that there are at least two large-scale neural networks: frontoparietal mirror-neuron areas related to perceptual-motor interactions with others, and cortical midline structures that engage in processing information about the self and others in cognitive and evaluative terms.

=== Relations ===
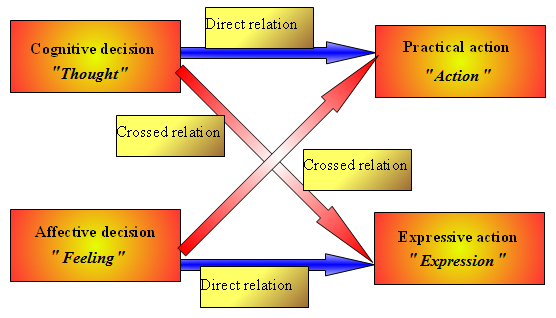
Intrapersonal relations

According to the model, intrapersonal relations can be:

- Direct (adjusted) relations (cognitive decision followed by practical action: "I decided that's better for me to leave my boyfriend, and I told him that", or affective decision followed by expressive action: "I love my girlfriend, so I'm always gentle with her");
- Crossed (unadjusted) relations (cognitive decision followed by expressive action: "Today I decided that it's better for me to break up with my girlfriend, and I'll behave so that she will leave me", or affective decision followed by practical action: "We love each other; that's why we are moving in together").

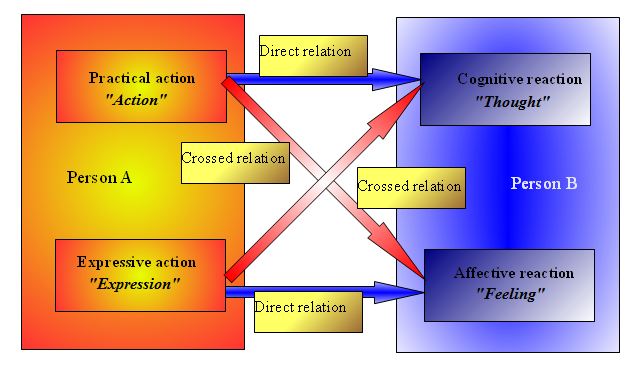
Interpersonal relations

Interpersonal relations can also be:

- Direct (cognitive reaction to another person's practical action: "My girlfriend wants to make up with me, and I agree, because that's better for both of us", or affective reaction to the other's expressive action: "She loves me, I can feel it in her eyes");
- Crossed (affective reaction to other's practical action: "My partner wants to buy me a house, and therefore I assume he/she loves me", or cognitive reaction to an expressive action of another person: "He is giving me a bitter look, and I'm wondering what is wrong?").

The locus of a relational disorder "is on the relationship rather than on any one individual in the relationship."

=== The self ===
The self is the self-reflective dimension of mental life, which has long been considered as the central element and support of any experience, as the notion of "subject of experience" suggests. There is only one "me", but they are not always center stage. Sometimes people are so focused on a task that they forget themselves altogether. The self is in fact at the center of the experience only during self-evaluation. In cognitive, affective, practical, and expressive tasks, consistency of specific operations involved in accomplishing the tasks was found to be significantly higher than consistency of the results of self-assessment involved in the same tasks.

Standard ways to tackle the self by considering self-evaluation do not target the self in its specificity. Instead, what is specific to the self is the subjective perspective, which is not intrinsically self-evaluative but rather relates any represented object to the representing subject.

We have no reason to believe that the self is permanently stuck into the heart of consciousness.
I am not always as intensively aware of me as an agent, as I am of my actions. That results from the fact that I perform only part of my actions, the other part being conducted by my thought, expression, practical operations, and so on.

=== Unconscious phenomena ===
As adaptive and regulative axes of personality provide integration of consciousness and personality, certain unconscious phenomena may result from the incomplete integration of one of these axes. For example, in subliminal perception, the adaptive, perceptual-motor axis is not properly integrated with other mental operations, and in dissociative disorders, the regulative axis is the one affected. If one of the axes does not function properly, both consciousness and performance in specific tasks are impaired.

=== Intelligence and personality ===
Intelligence and personality are often seen as fundamentally different, a fact which ignores both the performance aspect of personality, and intelligence-related traits. Thus, cognitive and emotional instruments are artificially separated from their energetic and value contents. The concept of dimensional capacity is therefore proposed as a binder of behavioral performance and content.

=== Biological and social adaptation ===
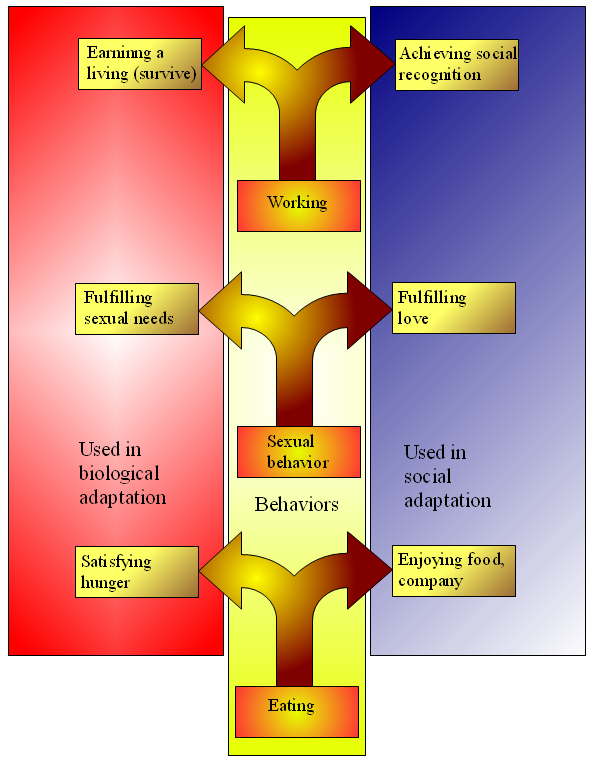
The "tree" of biological and psychosocial behaviors

The hypostatic model suggests that human behavior is usually the result of the random interference of two separate behavior systems: the "animal" system (biological adaptation) and the "human" system (social adaptation), both having the same biological underpinnings and partially sharing the same behavioral repertoire with different effects, not directly related. For example, while homosexual behavior does not have biological (reproductive) effect, it has social adaptive value in cultures that permit it or, as in ancient Greece, require it. Also, heterosexual behavior can have reproductive effect, but has no social adaptive value in monks or nuns. Cosmetic surgery has no biological value, but can be highly valued by society, while taking sleeping medication may have a biologically adaptive effect, but may not be socially adaptive in ascetic cultures. People can eat because they are hungry (biological adaptation), or because they like good food or want to enjoy the company of others (social adaptation). They can have sex to fulfill their sexual and reproductive needs (biological adaptation), or to fulfill their love, have children to bear their name, or simply have a good time together (social adaptation). People can use the same instinctual or learned behavior to different adaptive purposes, biological or social.

In critical situations, biological and social fields of adaptation converge, forming an integrated, bio-social adaptation system: confronted with new and spreading disease and risk factors, modern medicine made people live longer, healthier, more productive lives, and that, in turn, set the ground for further progress of civilization. Nobel laureate Ralph M. Steinman prolonged his life with the help of his own scientific discoveries, and this allowed him to continue research in cancer immunotherapy.

Preliminary experiments needing extensive verification have suggested that in well-rested subjects, engaging in "biological" behavior (eating, sex) does not lead to lowering of mental energy levels, as measured with a self-assessment scale, and engaging in "psychosocial" behavior (cognitive tasks) does not lead to lowering of physical energy levels (measured with a similar scale). However, in subjects with exhaustion both results were positive (feeding-related and sexual activities lowered both physical and mental energy levels, and engaging in cognitive tasks did the same). These results have been interpreted as an indication that biological and social systems of adaptation are energetically independent in "normal" conditions, and become energetically integrated (create a common pool of energy) in exhausting, "heavy duty" situations.

In sum, do "human" and "animal" in us really struggle [with each other]? We say it isn't the case. Rather, there are times when Man is too busy being human to be much of an animal, and times when he is being too animal to be human enough.

=== Decision making and free will ===
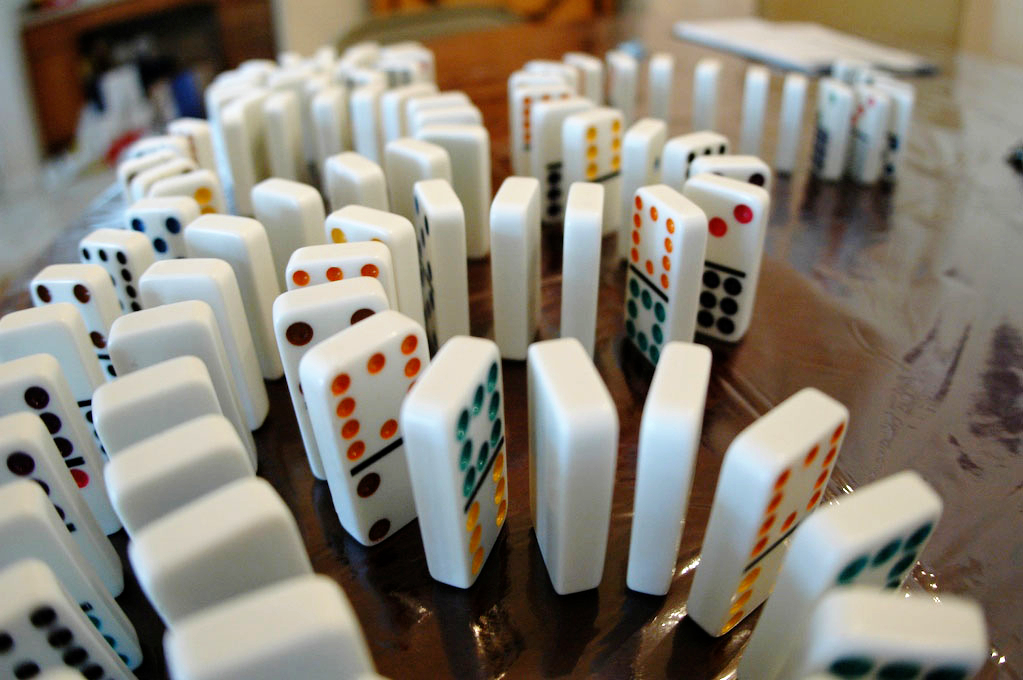
A domino's movement is determined completely by laws of physics. Even if people are similar to dominoes, they can have a form of free will.

Subjects who had the possibility to choose freely between performing different cognitive, practical, affective, and expressive tasks reported that they chose each task because they either a) felt the need to do it, b) considered this was the task they could perform most efficiently in given circumstances, or c) for both previous reasons. Not one of the three reasons above was statistically prevalent. This research suggested that human freedom can be scientifically interpreted in terms of an internal selection of environmental stimuli and internal variables, a selection which has a randomly variable, cognitive or affective locus. People with transient mental disorders, as well as people without disorders acted according to a probabilistic model, whereas those with chronic disorders showed a more deterministic pattern of behavior.

=== Personality development ===
Development pertains to long term change versus stability of personality. According to the hypostatic view, the actual development of a person is the result of the opposition between stimulating and inhibiting factors of development, factors that are biological and environmental in nature. If stimulating factors are dominant, then developmental progress results (new acquisitions are made); if inhibiting factors are dominant, then the result is developmental regression (acquisitions are lost). If the two kind of factors are of relatively equal force, development is stagnant. Development can be accelerated, decelerated, or of uniform speed, depending on the dynamics of the relation between stimulating and inhibiting factors.

Type of factors	Effect on personality development	Examples
Biological	Stimulating	positive heredity, good nutrition
Biological	Inhibiting	negative heredity, bad nutrition, trauma, disease
Environmental	Stimulating	good education, positive life events
Environmental	Inhibiting	bad education, negative life events

==== Childhood and adolescence ====
Some of the characteristics of personality development during childhood and adolescence are summarized in the table below.

Age	Regulation/adaptation strategies	Expressive behavior	Relational building
0 to 12 months	Modulating reactivity	Expressive synchronization with others. Discriminating others' expressions.	Social play. Social referral.
12 to 24 months	Awareness of own emotional reaction	Self-evaluation generates expressive behavior	Anticipating different feelings towards different persons
2.5 to 5 years	Regulation of emotions. Awareness of own feelings.	"As if" expressive behavior in play	Understanding of relations and behavior expectancies
5 to 7 years	Regulation of shame	Fabricated expressions in the presence of peers	Coordinating affective and expressive scripts
7 to 10 years	Developing control strategies	Using expressive behavior to modulate relational dynamics	Multiple affective reactions towards the same person
10 to 13 years	Developing self-control in stressful situations	Differentiating genuine from controlled emotional expressions	Affective and expressive scripts related to social roles
13+ years	Awareness of personal emotional cycles	Self-presentation strategies	Increased awareness of reciprocal emotional communication

==== Adulthood ====
During adulthood, the person is usually capable of creation and self-determination, and development can follow paths such as these:

- Evolutive–constructive–self-determined, which is characteristic to the free person who changes themself and the world they live in according to their own projects;
- Stagnant–constructive–self-determined – the person who sacrifices their own evolution in order to invest their entire creative freedom in transforming the world (the "selfless creators");
- Evolutive–reactive–self-determined – the person who uses their freedom mainly to determine their own evolution (personal achievement);
- Evolutive–reactive–determined – the person affected by compelling biological factors or environmental events, positive or negative, that restrain their freedom (e.g. disease, war, winning the big pot);
- Stagnant–reactive–determined is the submissive, responsive, and complying person who lives in a non-stimulating environment (a "dull" existence).

=== Psychopathology ===
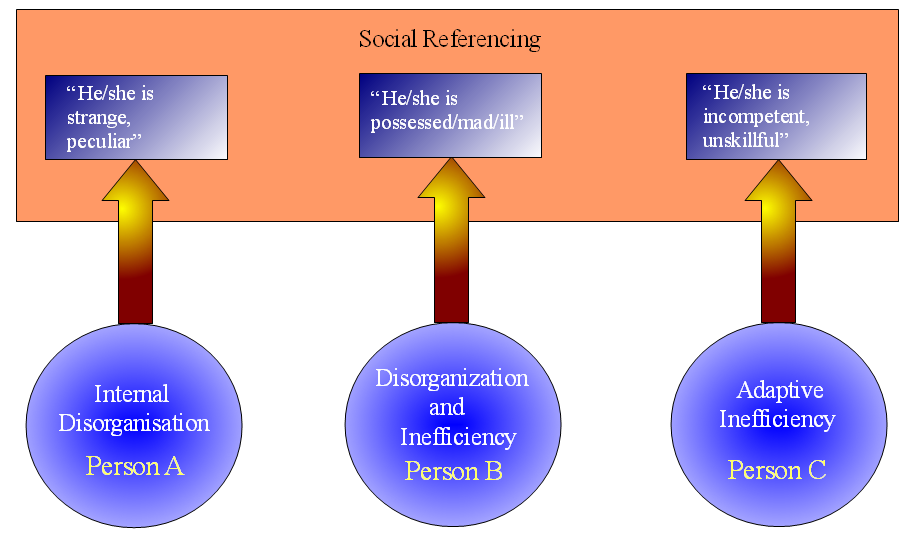
Social referencing of personal disorganization and inefficiency

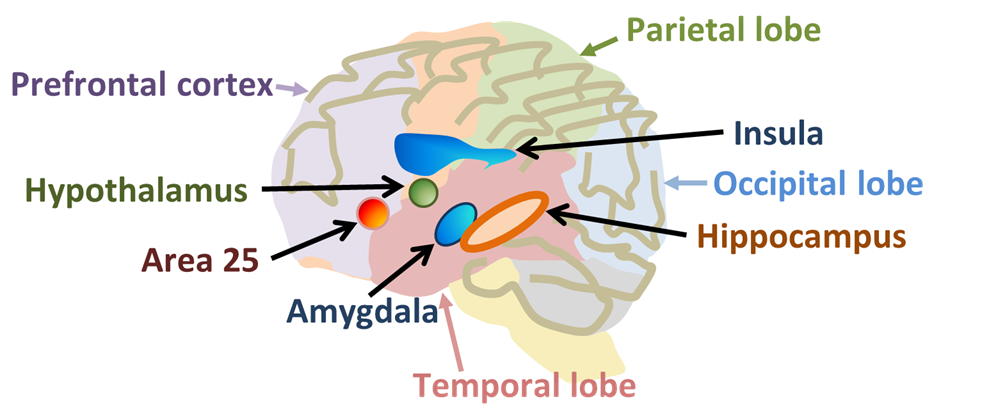
Some areas of the brain implicated in psychopathology. Area 25 refers to Brodmann's area 25, related to depression.

The unusual, the unnatural, and the counter-cultural in the area of mental life have been – in all ages – "subject of astonishment and reflection for individual reason, object of exclusion and confinement for social action", being met with "reserve or even repulsion by the public and with interest and even fascination by thinkers". In all cultures, aspects of internal disorganization and adaptive inefficiency of the person have generally been considered abnormal, whether they were referenced as "demonic possession", "madness", "mental illness", or "deviance" by different societies and theories. People displaying an efficient disorganization of personality and behavior do their job in spite of the fact that they are not well organized, and are generally described as "strange" by others, while those presenting an inefficient organization are not successful in what they do, although their behavior is consistent; they have a high rate of failure, caused by a low level of acquisitions and/or functioning.

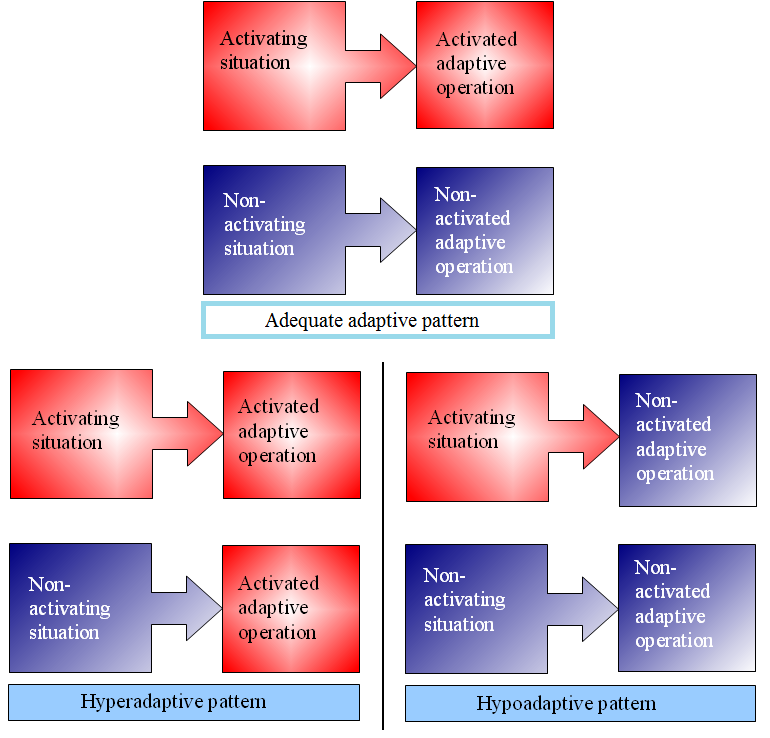
Adaptive patterns

Efficient adaptive patterns are those in which specific adaptive behavior is displayed only in situations that require it ("activating situations"), whereas inefficient adaptive patterns are those in which adaptive behavior is inappropriate in the given situation. Inefficient adaptive patterns can be hyperadaptive, when adaptive operations are active in both activating and non-activating situations (as in mania), or hypoadaptive, when adaptive operations remain inactive in both types of situations (as in depression).

People tend to neglect stimuli with low cognitive or affective significance to them, as well as forget excessively intense emotions and information that is too difficult for them to understand. Experiments performed on individuals which were given cognitive and affective (evaluative) tasks much above their current levels of cognitive and emotional competence led to difficulties in remembering the difficult tasks, associated with lowering of performance in previously mastered tasks. Improving performance in simple, repetitive tasks in anxious patients improves memory of failed tasks as anxiety symptoms decrease.

=== Broader applications ===
The model of personality components and axes was extended to familial-organizational and societal levels. The model was also applied to the study of the historical evolution of human civilization in the process of globalization, as well as in the analysis of literary characters seen as novel creations "in humans' image" and part of the "neoverse" – the universe created by the author of a literary work.

== Methods ==
=== Methodological parameters ===
The hypostatic model uses several qualitative parameters for the assessment of personality investigation and intervention; these parameters can be applied to any scientific endeavor.

==== Parameters of investigation assessment ====
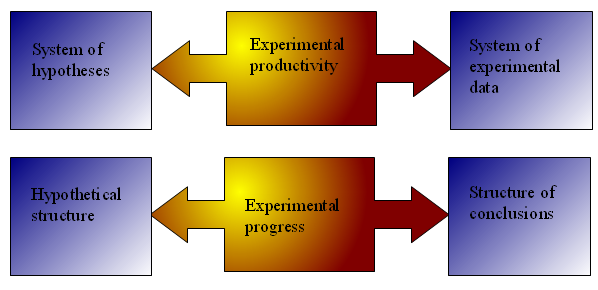
Parameters for the assessment of personality investigation

- Experimental productivity is the difference between the system of hypotheses and the system of experimental data resulting from the research; it measures the efficiency and precision of scientific prediction – a greater difference means a lower predictability of the experiment.
- Experimental progress is the difference between the hypothetical structure of the research and the structure of its conclusions ("theses"); it represents the contribution to knowledge of that particular research project. A greater difference between hypotheses and conclusions means more new ideas suggested by the experimental outcome, thus a greater progress.

==== Parameters of intervention assessment ====
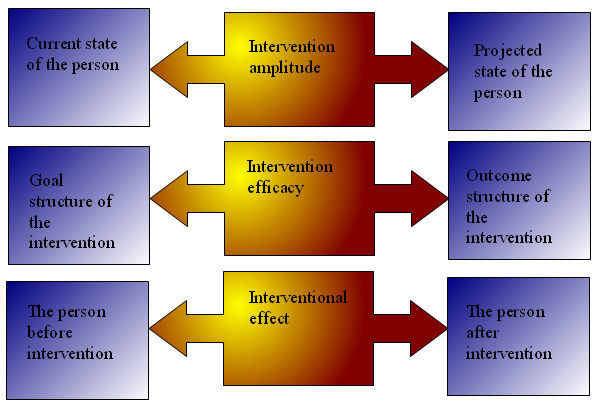
Parameters for the assessment of interventions on personality

- Intervention amplitude is the difference between the current state of the person and her state projected as the outcome of the intervention – the "ambition" of the intervention;
- Intervention efficacy is the ratio of goal structure to outcome structure of the intervention;
- Interventional effect (transformation or change) is the difference between the person before and after intervention – it indicates the degree of modification of personality induced by the mental health professional or educator.

=== Nearest-neighbor comparison ===
Nearest-neighbor comparison of two persons in a sample involves comparing a person A with the person B who has the closest match to A on one or more given criteria. It is also called the method of hypostatic definition, because of "defining" a person through their genus (in this case the nearest neighbor) by outlining their differentia. By comparing two very similar persons and trying to detect the differences between them, the researcher obtains a deeper knowledge of both persons.

The steps of the technique are:

- Finding the nearest neighbor B of the person A;
- Comparing the two persons (A and B) and finding as many differences as possible based on the methods used in data gathering;
- Rebuilding a richer picture of each person (A and B), based on the differences that have been identified. For example, person B is almost as aggressive as person A (nearest neighbor). Through comparison it is found that while A is most aggressive at home, B is most aggressive at work (difference). Comprehensive data about concrete aspects of human personality gathered from many individuals all over the world can be digitized and stored in a "hypostatic library" with practically limitless growing potential, given the current developments in computing technology; data in this library could be used as reference in further research and practice.

=== Setting the goals for personality change ===
In this kind of humanistic "psychological engineering", setting the goals for personality change is completely non-normative and non-judgemental. There is nothing wrong that must be remedied, no disease to cure, but an end state to be reached, like in the following goal formulations by the subjects and/or their families:

- "I want to be in a certain way, planned by me";
- "I want to be like I was before";
- "I want to be like other people";
- "I want to be the way that others want me to be";
- "I want to be different from how I am today".

=== Summary of methods ===
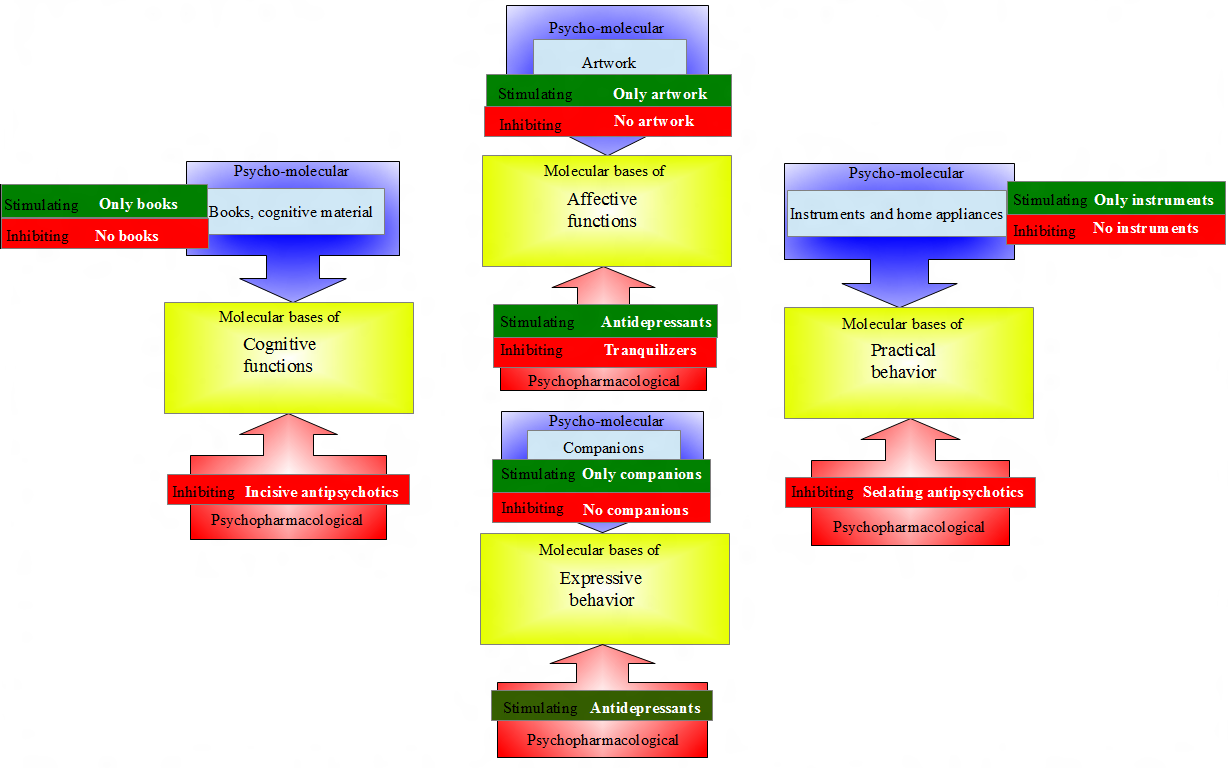
Psychopharmacological and psychomolecular treatments

The model uses the following methods of assessment and intervention:

- Biological and ecological assessment through methods of dynamic analysis of development, investigating the complex interplay of stimulating and inhibiting factors of development and their effects on developmental speed (acceleration or deceleration), with prognostic implications;
- Cognitive and affective techniques (method of prints of consciousness, based on self-coverage and self-report; human liberty test, using free-choice activities in order to study probability in an individual's behavior);
- Practical techniques (method of operational chains, a form of mental chronometry that ensured the identification of mental operations and allows the assessment of their speed and functionality);
- Regulative techniques (task boosting techniques);
- Perceptual-motor adaptation techniques (test of adaptive reactivity; method of adaptive therapy, based on non-specific perceptual-motor learning);
- Psychopharmacological techniques, using drugs that act specifically on different constitutive axes of personality (cognitive, practical, affective, expressive);
- Psycho-molecular method, influencing the activity of specific neurotransmitter systems through specific psychological tasks; the method is part of psycho-molecular medicine, which integrates details of molecular structure into upper, psychosocial levels of the human organism.
- Relational techniques, which aim to "set the things straight" by assessing relations and replacing crossed (indirect) relations with direct (straight) relations.

=== Psycho-molecular therapy ===
The psycho-molecular method uses specific tasks in order to influence specific neurotransmitter systems. Through the control of the environment which is selectively enriched or deprived, some of the subject's brain areas can be stimulated or inhibited systematically, leading to changes in the seric levels of the metabolites of certain neurotransmitters, associated with clinical improvement in burnout individuals. Behavioral approaches have a critical impact on molecular patterns of autoregulation, leading to the assumption of a bio-psycho-socio-molecular model of autoregulation, including stress and pain. Thus, molecules and behavior may be seen as two sides of the same problem in pain and stress relief.

Psycho-molecular techniques can be stimulating or inhibiting. Stimulating techniques involve the presence of environmental materials that allow a single type of activity (cognitive, practical, affective, or expressive). For example, the subject sits in a room where he has nothing else to do except read. Inhibiting techniques selectively exclude from the subject's environment materials that allow one specific type of activity, leaving all the other types available (for example, the subject can look at paintings, watch sports on TV, prepare his food, but has no books or other learning material in his room).

Stimulating techniques are:

- Practical technique, that involves living at a farm where the sole activity is food foraging and preparation;
- Expressive technique, that involves relational experiences in a room where the subject lives together with another person;
- Cognitive technique, that puts the subject in a room where books and other learning material are the only object of activity;
- Affective technique, that involves placing the subject in a room where there are only art works and audio and video hardware for listening music and watching movies.

Inhibiting techniques are:

- Cognitive technique, that excludes from the environment textbooks and other objects of cognitive behavior;
- Affective technique, that excludes sources of affective and aesthetic evaluation;
- Practical technique, that excludes home appliances, cleaning activities, preparing food, and setting the table;
- Expressive technique, that places the subject in a room with all facilities, but where interactions with other persons are reduced at a minimum.

The control of the effects of these techniques is made through clinical scales and biochemical tests monitoring serum levels of metabolites of several stimulating and inhibiting neurotransmitters: dopamine (homovanillic acid), norepinephrine (3-methoxy-4-hydroxyphenylglycol), and serotonin (5-hydroxyindoleacetic acid). Although less spectacular than with psychopharmacological methods, the effect of psycho-molecular therapy is more complex and natural, and needs to be associated with psychopharmacological and psychotherapeutic treatments.

=== Relational therapy ===
Relational (or direct relations) therapy (RT) is a method of psychotherapy aimed at changing the relations between the four dimensions of doing – thinking, acting, feeling, and expressing, both within the person and in their relationships.

==== Goals ====
The main goal of RT is improving client's communication and relationships through:

1. Replacing crossed intrapersonal relations with direct intrapersonal relations; instead of expressing what they think or acting out what they feel, the client should act the way they thinks and express what they feel. Characterological self-blame (through attributing affective and personal, relatively nonmodifiable sources to own actions) has been proved to be more depressogenic than behavioral self-blame (through attributing cognitive and impersonal, controllable sources to actions). For example, female victims of rape who said to themselves 'It was me, it was something I've done that provoked this' were more depressed than those who said 'The fact that I was walking through that part of the town caused the attack'.
2. Replacing crossed interpersonal relations with direct interpersonal relations; instead of feeling about others' acts or thinking about what others express, the client should think about others' acts and feel what others express. Many problems originate in acting to please or hurt others, and in being pleased or hurt by others' actions.

Being accepted and getting approval from others always will seem just out of reach. And, even if you succeed at pleasing others, you find that your fears of rejection, abandonment, or angry confrontation will not diminish or be alleviated. In fact, they grow stronger over time. The Disease to Please creates a psychological blockade against both sending and receiving these negative emotions. For this reason, it cripples the very relationships you slave to satisfy and try so hard to protect.

==== Indications ====
The indications of RT consist of all kinds of relational problems that may arise in dating, family and work relationships, casual social encounters, as well as anxiety, depression, and other mental problems. In the case of problems in stable relationships, both partners should be assessed and participate in sessions, if needed.

==== Client-therapist relationship ====
During therapy sessions, client and therapist promote direct relations between each other. For this they are required:

- to let their feelings for each other be expressed through their body language;
- to avoid verbalizing what they feel about each other;
- to freely and boldly verbalize what they think about one another;
- not to let their body language be the mean of communication of thoughts they do not dare utter;
- to try to feel each other's emotions as they are expressed through their body language;
- not to be emotionally moved by each other's actions, as in taking things personally;
- to reflect about the actions of each other;
- not to try to discover some meaning in each other's body language.

Relational therapy is in accord with other psychotherapeutic approaches in understanding the nature of human relationships and the therapeutic mechanisms: many forms of psychotherapy, such as psychoanalysis, person-centered therapy, and cognitive therapy, aim ultimately to create direct relations between thoughts and actions, and between feelings and expressions, so as the client's thoughts really get in touch with their feelings, and their expressions really support their actions.

We instruct the patient to put himself into a state of quiet, unreflecting self-observation, and to report to us whatever internal observations he is able to make [...] not to exclude any of them, whether on the ground that it is too disagreeable or too indiscreet to say, or that it is too unimportant or irrelevant, or that it is nonsensical and need not be said.

— Sigmund Freud

Being genuine also involves the willingness to be and to express, in my words and my behavior, the various feelings and attitudes which exist in me.[...] It is only by providing this genuine reality which is in me, that the other person can successfully seek for the reality in him.

— Carl Rogers

To help people achieve the three basic rational emotive behavior therapy philosophies of unconditional self-acceptance, unconditional other-acceptance, and unconditional life-acceptance, cognitive, emotional, and behavioral methods [...] are used.

— Albert Ellis

==== Initial assessment ====
The initial assessment in RT has two main objectives:

- Establish what is the main problem that led the client to therapy;
- Identify crossed relations within the person, and between them and others.

==== Therapy sessions and techniques ====
A typical session of RT involves the following steps:

1. The client presents their crossed relations, as they occurred since the last session;
2. The therapist asks the client how they think the correct relation should sound like, and tells them that, if they could not say;
3. The therapist, along with the client, tries to identify crossed intrapersonal relations in people with whom the client interacts;
4. The therapist asks the client about what they think they could do to counteract those crossed relations, in order to improve communication relationships with those people, and makes suggestions to them, if they have no ideas.

==== Outcome assessment ====
A final assessment through interview and questionnaire is made, to see:

1. If there are residual crossed relations in the client's life;
2. If they are able to prevent new crossed relations from occurring;
3. If they are able to counteract crossed relations in others with whom they interact, in order to maintain good communication relationships with those people;
4. To what extent the initial problems for which they have addressed to the therapist have been solved.

==== Treating typical problems ====
Interpersonal problems: relationship management

Problem definition: I decided that's better for me to leave my boyfriend, and I tried to show him that (expressing thoughts through behavior).

Problem solution: I decided that's better for me to leave my boyfriend, and I told him that (actively and explicitly communicating thoughts).

Problem definition: My girlfriend wants to make up with me, and I'm thrilled about that, because that means that she loves me (feeling about the other's intended actions).

Problem solution: My girlfriend wants to make up with me, and I think that's better for both of us (thinking about the other's intended actions).

Problem definition: I love my girlfriend, and I always make her gifts (acting out feelings).

Problem solution: I love my girlfriend, and I'm always gentle with her (expressing feelings).

Problem definition: I can see in her eyes that she thinks I'm smart (thinking about other's expressions as indicating supposed thoughts).

Problem solution: I can see in her eyes that she likes me (feeling other's expressions).

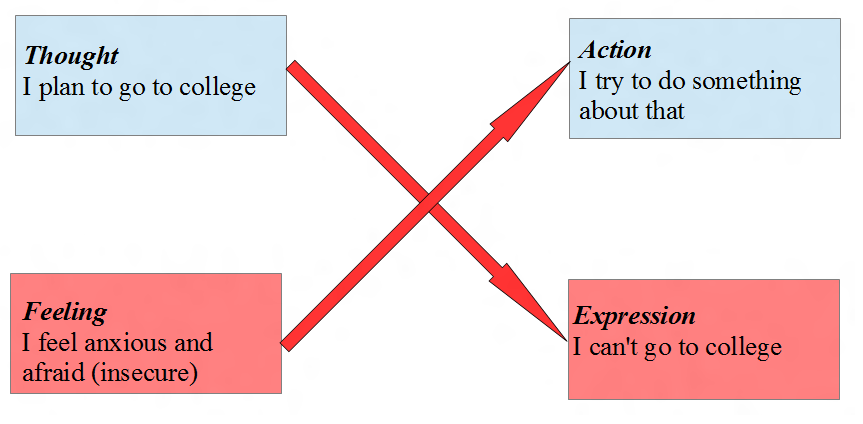
Crossed intrapersonal relations before therapy

An intrapersonal problem: fear of going to college

First, client and therapist identify crossed intrapersonal relations, through the following scenario:

- I plan to go to college [thought], but I can't do it [expression]. Thoughts not acted out give rise to pathological expressions (symptoms), because only feelings – and not thoughts – can be really expressed nonverbally. This is a crossed relation between thought and expression;
- I feel anxious and afraid [feeling], and I try to do something about that [action]. This is a crossed relation between feeling and action – the client tries to change his feelings through voluntary action but, as expected, he is unable to.

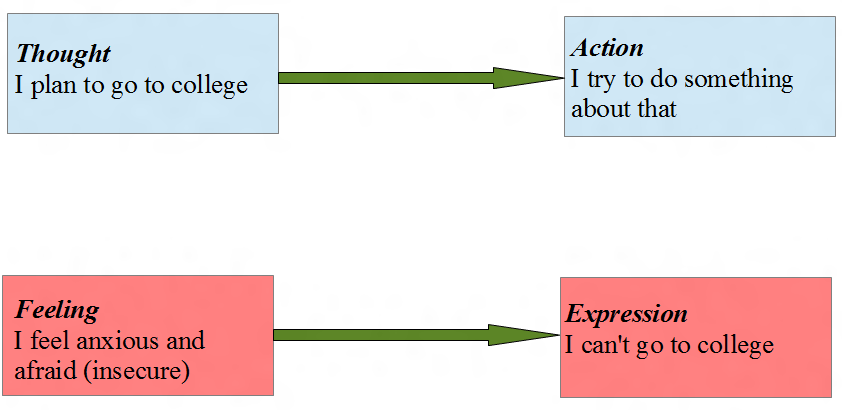
Establishing direct intrapersonal relations during therapy

The first step of therapy consists of creating direct relations between feelings and expressions, and between thoughts and actions:

- I feel insecure [feeling], and that's why I can't go to college [expression]. The client interprets his inability to go to college as an emotional expression of his insecurity. This is a direct relation between feeling and expression;
- I plan to go to college [thought], and I try to do something about that [action], because I cannot simply command myself not to be afraid anymore (by means of rational decision). This is a direct relation between thought and action.

In the second step of therapy, the natural result of establishing direct relations is that the problem ceases to exist:

- I plan to go to college [thought], and I try to take concrete steps in that direction [action];
- I don't feel so anxious and afraid [the unwanted feeling is gone], and I feel I can go to college [the unwanted emotional expression is gone]. When I'm afraid about it [accepted feeling], I express my fears [accepted emotional expression].

==== Group interventions ====
Relational therapy can be applied in families, organizations, and classrooms to change crossed relations and thus increase performance and satisfaction in work and learning. For example, confronted with a poor homework of a student, a teacher may think that by doing the homework that way, the student wants to defy him. If that is true, the problem is with the student – she tends to express their feelings indirectly, through their actions (feeling-action crossed intrapersonal relation). If that is not true, and the student was just lazy or incompetent, the problem is with the teacher – he tends to take personally and process emotionally the acts of others (action-feeling crossed interpersonal relation). Whatever the source of the problem, relations counselor uses both individual and couple interventions, based on drawing a relational matrix of the group, which shows crossed relations. If, for some reason, one of the partners could not be changed, the other may be taught to compensate his crossed (distorted) relation through another crossed relation, the result being an accurate communication at both rational and emotional levels. For example, if one of the partners is busy and does not have time to spend with the other, but does not dare to tell them that, and instead expresses that through his body language, the other learns to interpret this body language not as emotional indifference (what it seems to be), but as a sign of busyness (what it actually is), and thus she will not be hurt anymore.

== Evaluation ==
Karl Jaspers criticized the hypostatic method as used in the study of personality, arguing that:

Types, images, and theoretical systems are used by us purely as schemata of ideas to illuminate the path of our knowledge of particulars but they are not significant for knowledge in themselves. If now we objectify these schemata, images and theories and give them a being as if they were there as an object is there, then we 'hypostasise' an idea. This is the way in which ideas lose all their élan as a break-through movement of knowledge into the open and the knowledge we are left with is a sort of pseudo-knowledge which sooner or later will have to reveal itself as 'lacking in objectivity'.

— Karl Jaspers, General Psychopathology

Some presentations of the hypostatic model have been criticized for containing too many neologisms that make it difficult to understand, and for being "doomed to be incomplete".

The model was praised for being "original" and "provocative", and for inaugurating the field of "concrete-systemic" or "hypostatic" psychology. It alludes to understanding the effects of illicit substances and disease, as well as the underlying change in personality which likely ensues in relation. It shows that personality is believed to be static and relatively in-changeable, whereas ideology is more dynamic than personality. The model was cited as one of the reference sources on the subjects of self, character, and personality.

== See also ==
- Cognitive-affective personality system
- Constructivist epistemology
- Contextualism
- Personality systematics
- Perspectivism
- Postmodernism
- Relationalism
- Second-order cybernetics
- Social neuroscience
- Systems psychology
- Internal Family Systems
