= Walter Mischel =

Austrian-born American psychologist

- Born: February 22, 1930; Vienna, First Austrian Republic
- Died: September 12, 2018 (aged 88); New York City, New York, U.S.
- Education: New York University; Ohio State University
- Known for: Stanford marshmallow experiment
- Awards: Grawemeyer Award in Psychology (2011)
- Scientific career
- Fields: Delayed gratification, personality psychology, social psychology
- Workplaces: Columbia University; Stanford University; Harvard University
- Thesis: Variables Influencing the Generalization of Expectancy Statements (1956)
- Doctoral advisor: Julian Rotter

Walter Mischel (German: [ˈvaltɐ ˈmɪʃl̩]; February 22, 1930 – September 12, 2018) was an Austrian-born American psychologist specializing in personality theory and social psychology. He was the Robert Johnston Niven Professor of Humane Letters in the Department of Psychology at Columbia University. A Review of General Psychology survey, published in 2002, ranked Mischel as the 25th most cited psychologist of the 20th century.

== Early life ==
Mischel was born on February 22, 1930 in Vienna, Austria, to Salomon Mischel and the former Lola Leah Schreck. He was the brother of Theodore Mischel, who became an American philosopher. When he was 8 years old his Jewish family fled with him to the United States after the Nazi occupation in 1938. He grew up in Brooklyn, New York City where he attended New York University and received his bachelor's degree (1951) and master's degree (1953). He continued his studies under George Kelly and Julian Rotter at Ohio State University, where he received his Ph.D. in clinical psychology in 1956. He spent much of his career studying delayed gratification and life outcomes of those who were able to maintain self-control when studied.

== Professional career ==
Mischel taught at the University of Colorado from 1956 to 1958, at Harvard University from 1958 to 1962, and at Stanford University from 1962 to 1983. Since 1983, Mischel was in the Department of Psychology at Columbia University.

Mischel was elected to the National Academy of Sciences in 2004 and to the American Academy of Arts and Sciences in 1991. In 2007, Mischel was elected president of the Association for Psychological Science. Mischel's other honors include the Distinguished Scientific Contribution Award from the American Psychological Association, the Distinguished Scientist Award of the Society of Experimental Social Psychologists, the Distinguished Contributions to Personality Award of the Society of Social and Personality Psychologists, and the Distinguished Scientist Award of American Psychological Association's Division of Clinical Psychology. He was editor of Psychological Review and was president of the American Psychological Association Division of Social and Personality Psychology and of the Association for Research in Personality.

Mischel was the recipient of the 2011 University of Louisville Grawemeyer Award in Psychology for his studies in self-control.

== Contributions to personality theory ==
In 1968, Mischel published the controversial book, Personality and Assessment, which created a paradigm crisis in personality psychology. The book touched upon the problem in trait assessment that was first identified by Gordon Allport in 1937. Mischel found that empirical studies often failed to support the fundamental traditional assumption of personality theory, that an individual's behavior with regard to an inferred trait construct (e.g. conscientiousness; sociability) remained highly consistent across diverse situations. Instead, Mischel cautioned that an individual's behavior was highly dependent upon situational cues, rather than expressed consistently across diverse situations that differed in meaning. Mischel maintained that behavior is shaped largely by the exigencies of a given situation and that the notion that individuals act in consistent ways across different situations, reflecting the influence of underlying personality traits, is a myth.

=== Situation and behavior ===
Mischel made the case that the field of personality psychology was searching for consistency in the wrong places. Instead of treating situations as the noise or "error of measurement", Mischel's work proposed that by including the situation as it is perceived by the individual and by analyzing behavior in its situational context, the consistencies that characterize the individual would be found. He argued that these individual differences would not be expressed in consistent cross-situational behavior, but instead, he suggested that consistency would be found in distinctive but stable patterns of if-then, situation-behavior relations that form contextualized, psychologically meaningful "personality signatures" (e.g., "s/he does A when X, but does B when Y").

These signatures of personality have been in fact revealed in a large observational study of social behavior across multiple repeated situations over time. Contradicting the classic assumptions, the data showed that individuals who were similar in average levels of behavior, for example in their aggression, nevertheless differed predictably and dramatically in the types of situations in which they exhibited aggression. As predicted by Mischel, they were characterized by highly psychologically informative if-then behavioral signatures. Collectively, this work has allowed a new way to conceptualize and assess both the stability and variability of behavior that is produced by the underlying personality system and has opened a window into the dynamic processes within the system itself.

=== Self-control ===
In a second direction, beginning in the late 1960s and early 1970s, Mischel pioneered work illuminating the ability to delay gratification and to exert self-control in the face of strong situational pressures and emotionally "hot" temptations. His studies with preschoolers in the late 1960s often referred to as "the marshmallow experiment", examined the processes and mental mechanisms that enable a young child to forgo immediate gratification and to wait instead for a larger desired but delayed reward. The test was simple: give the child an option between an immediate treat or more of a delayed treat. For example, the proctor would give the child an option to eat one marshmallow immediately or to wait ten minutes and receive not one, but two marshmallows to eat. The test did not have to be conducted with marshmallows specifically; it could be done with Oreo cookies, M&Ms, or other desirable treats. As Mischel followed up with the parents of the children who took the test years later, he found a staggering correlation between those kids who had difficulty delaying gratification and their outcomes in life as an adult. For those kids who had trouble waiting for the delectable delight, they tended to have higher rates of obesity and below-average levels of academic achievement later in life. Their counterparts who were able to wait longer for the treat had stark different outcomes down the road, including lower body mass index and higher standardized test scores. Still a stark contrast appeared when studying children who were raised by parents below the poverty line compared with children whose parents were college-educated. A significantly larger portion of the low-income children ate the treat immediately conversely from the counterparts who waited.

Continuing research with these original participants has examined how preschool delay of gratification ability links to development over the life course and may predict a variety of important outcomes (e.g., SAT scores, social and cognitive competence, educational attainment, and drug use), and can have significant protective effects against a variety of potential vulnerabilities. This work also opened a route to research on temporal discounting in decision-making, and most importantly into the mental mechanisms that enable cognitive and emotional self-control, thereby helping to demystify the concept of willpower. While the data is clear about the outcomes of a child failing or passing the Marshmallow Test, what is not clear is understanding why the subjects quickly consume the treat or wait for more. Walter Mischel conducted additional research and predicted that the Marshmallow Test can also be a test of trust. Children who were raised by absent parents were less likely to pass possibly because they did not trust the stranger when he or she said they would be given double the reward if they waited. They trusted their instincts and acted upon a certain thing. In addition, Mischel believed that the children who wait have the inherent ability to reach their goals and hold positive expectations. This understanding is a hypothesis for why the outcomes later in life are so starkly different.

== Media appearances ==
Mischel appeared on The Colbert Report in September 2014 to discuss his studies shortly after the release of his first book meant for a general audience, The Marshmallow Test. In October 2014, an extensive interview with him was published on the PBS NewsHour "Making Sen$e" economics website, and in January 2015, he and his work were featured twice on the PBS NewsHour broadcast. On June 24, 2016, Mischel was interviewed for the Invisibilia Podcast "The Personality Myth" on National Public Radio. He discussed the way that personality works and how it can change over time when a person is presented with new situational circumstances.

== Personal life ==
Mischel lived in Manhattan in New York City, and enjoyed painting and travel. He had three children and six grandchildren. Mischel spoke several languages, including English and French, and spent time in Paris, France on a regular basis and frequented Bend, Oregon later in life. He died at his home in New York from pancreatic cancer on September 12, 2018.

== Selected bibliography ==
=== Scientific publications ===
- Mischel, W. (1968). Personality and assessment. New York: Wiley.
- Mischel, W. (1973). Toward a cognitive social learning reconceptualization of personality. Psychological Review, 80, 252–283.
- Mischel, W., Shoda, Y., & Rodriguez, M. L. (1989). Delay of gratification in children. Science, 244, 933–938.
- Mischel, W. & Shoda, Y. (1995). A cognitive-affective system theory of personality: Reconceptualizing situations, dispositions, dynamics, and invariance in personality structure. Psychological Review, 102, 246–268.
- Metcalfe, J., & Mischel, W. (1999). A hot/cool system analysis of delay of gratification: Dynamics of willpower. Psychological Review, 106, 3–19.
- Mischel, W., & Ayduk, O. (2004). "Willpower in a cognitive-affective processing system: The dynamics of delay of gratification". In R. F. Baumeister & K. D. Vohs (Eds.), Handbook of self-regulation: Research, Theory, and Applications (pp. 99–129). New York: Guilford.
- Mischel, W. (2004). "Toward an integrative science of the person". Annual Review of Psychology, 55, 1–22.

=== Autobiography ===
- Mischel, W. (2007). "Walter Mischel". In G. Lindzey & W. M. Runyan (Eds.), A History of Psychology in Autobiography (Vol. IX, pp. 229–267). Washington, DC: American Psychological Association.

=== Popular press ===
- Mischel, W. (2014). The Marshmallow Test. New York: Little, Brown.

== See also ==
- Situationism
