= Personality and Social Psychology Bulletin =

Scientific journal

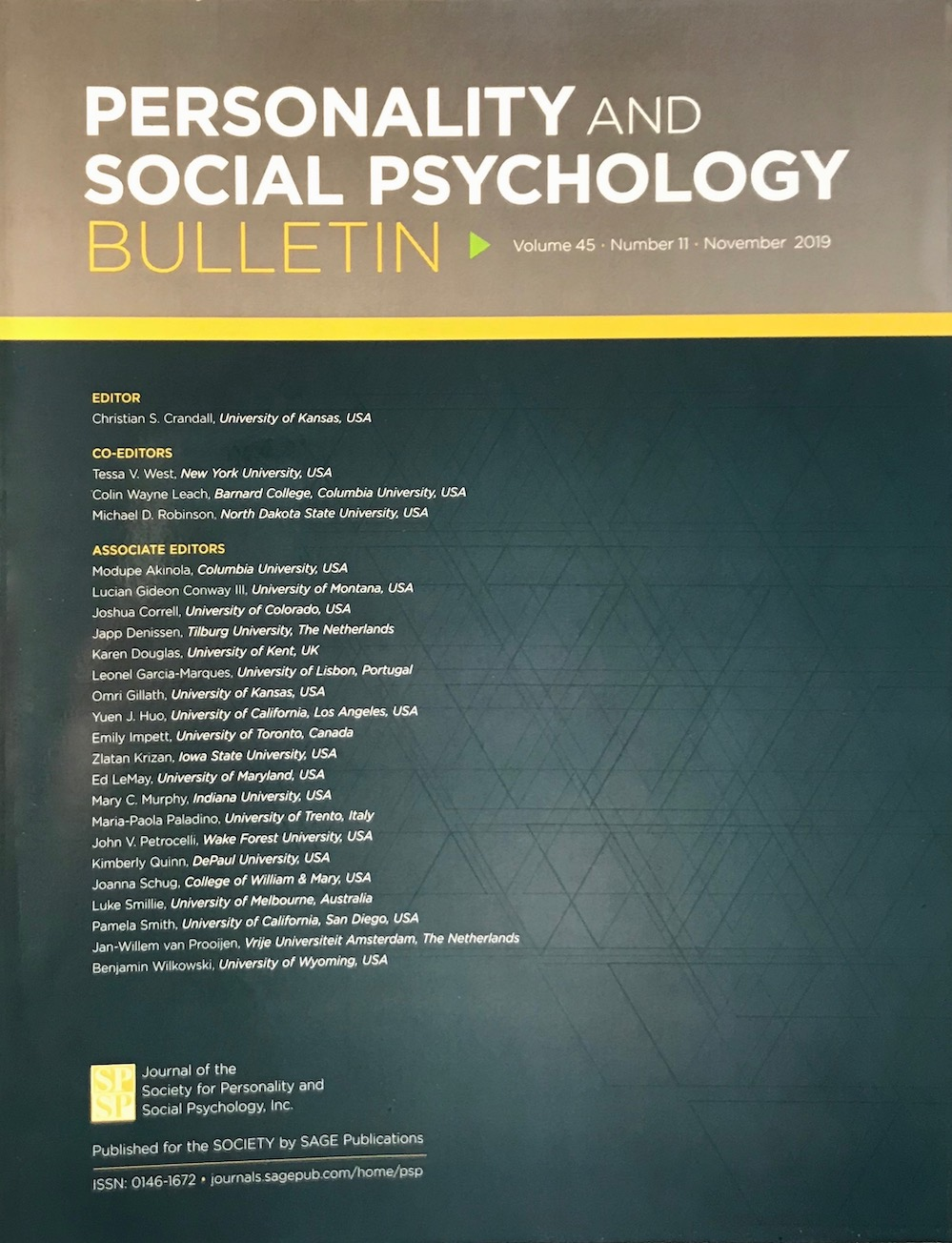
- Discipline: Psychology
- Language: English
- Edited by: Michael Robinson

Publication details
- Former names: Proceedings of the Division of Personality and Society Psychology
- History: 1974–present
- Publisher: SAGE Publications
- Frequency: Monthly
- Impact factor: 4.38 (2020)

Standard abbreviations
- ISO 4: Pers. Soc. Psychol. Bull.

Indexing
- ISSN: 0146-1672 (print); 1552-7433 (web)
- LCCN: 77649010
- OCLC no.: 709977082

Links
- Journal homepage; Online access; Online archive

Personality and Social Psychology Bulletin is a scientific journal published monthly published by SAGE Publications for the Society for Personality and Social Psychology (SPSP). The journal's senior editorial team include: Editor Michael D. Robinson (North Dakota State University), Co-Editor Yuen J. Huo (University of California, Los Angeles), Co-Editor Emily A. Impett (University of Toronto) and Co-Editor Benjamin M. Wilkowski (University of Wyoming). This journal is a member of the Committee on Publication Ethics (COPE).

== Abstracting and indexing ==
Personality and Social Psychology Bulletin is abstracted and indexed in MEDLINE, Scopus and the Social Sciences Citation Index. According to Thomson Reuters 2019 Journal Citation Reports, Personality and Social Psychology Bulletin's impact factor is 2.961, ranking it 11th out of 64 journals in the Psychology, Social category.
