= David C. Funder =

American psychologist (born 1953)

- Born: February 15, 1953 (age 72); Long Beach, California, US
- Employer: UC Riverside

Academic background
- Education: UC Berkeley (BA); Stanford University (PhD)
- Thesis: The person-situation interaction in attitude change (1979)
- Doctoral advisor: Daryl Bem
- Other advisor: Jack Block (BA)

Academic work
- Discipline: Psychology
- Sub-discipline: Personality psychology
- Notable students: Simine Vazire
- Notable works: The Personality Puzzle

David Charles Funder (born February 15, 1953 in Long Beach) is a personality psychologist and a Distinguished Professor of Psychology at the University of California, Riverside. His research focuses on personality judgment and he is the creator of the Riverside Situational Q-Sort (RSQ).

== Education ==
After attending Sacramento State University for two years, Funder earned his BA in psychology in 1974 from University of California, Berkeley, where he worked with Jack Block. At Berkeley, he was inducted into Phi Beta Kappa. Block had a profound impact on Funder and the two continued working together for decades. He then joined Daryl Bem's group at Stanford University to earn his PhD in Social Psychology and finished in 1979. Walter Mischel, Lee Ross, and Mark Lepper were among his professors at Stanford. In the fourth edition of The Personality Puzzle (2007), Funder describes a delayed gratification experiment he performed with Daryl Bem similar to the Stanford marshmallow experiment. He concluded that what he was testing was the child’s ability to cooperate with adults, not the child's ability to delay gratification.

== Career ==
After earning his PhD, Funder joined the faculty at Harvey Mudd College, where he taught for three years. He then moved to Harvard University as an assistant professor in 1982, and to University of Illinois, Urbana-Champaign in 1986 as an associate professor. In 1989, he returned to California to teach at University of California, Riverside, where he was promoted to full professor in 1991. He served as the department chair of the psychology department from 2002 to 2006 and was made a Distinguished Professor in 2007. He was the president of the Association for Research in Personality from 2010 to 2012 and president of the Society for Personality and Social Psychology in 2013. Funder was also the editor-in-chief of Journal of Personality (1994-2002) and an associate editor of the Journal of Personality and Social Psychology. Simine Vazire credits The Personality Puzzle as a driving factor in her decision to pursue psychology, and later worked in Funder's lab at Riverside.

Funder is the creator of the Riverside Situational Q-Sort (RSQ), wherein participants rank 90 items based on whether they are characteristic of a given situation. These items include "talking is permitted", "situation is complex", "a job needs to be done", and "situation may cause feelings of hostility." Three findings from trials using RSQ include that "situations a person experiences over time are more similar to each other than they are to the situations that someone else experiences and vice versa, which is part of the reason why people’s behavior is consistent over their lives;" experiences were described similarly across different cultures; and that items ranked negatively were more varied than those ranked positively, which co-author Sylvie Graf attributed to society's regulation of certain behaviors. Funder said that the RSQ is applicable to a wide range of fields and industries, which he believes is both a strength and a weakness. He also points to "the fundamental problem of cultural comparison that anyone conducting cultural comparison lives in a culture themselves."

His work with Joachim Krueger focused on the attempt to decipher the variables and factors that result in personality judgments. Funder later published a paper identifying four "moderator variables" to determine a judgment's accuracy: "good target," meaning that the person being judged is easy to read, such as due to familiarity or having animated facial expressions; "good trait", meaning that certain personality traits are "more visible" than others; "good information", which refers to the quantity and quality of the information on which a judgment is made; and "good judge", referring to the judger's skill at judging.

Funder was the winner of the Jack Block Award in 2008 and UC Riverside's Doctoral Dissertation Advisor/Mentoring Award in 2013. In 2022, he was included in research.com's list of Top 1,000 Scientists. He is a Fellow of the Association for Psychological Science, Western Psychological Association, American Association for the Advancement of Science, American Psychological Association, Society for Personality and Social Psychology, and the Society for Experimental Social Psychology. He is also a member of the European Association of Personality Psychology, Society for Industrial and Organizational Psychology, and Society for Judgment and Decision Making.

== Selected publications ==
- The Arden American (1966). Sacramento, CA: The Funderbolt News Service.
- "Errors and mistakes: Evaluating the accuracy of social judgment" (1987). Psychological Bulletin, 101, 75–90. doi:10.1037/0033-2909.101.1.75.
- "Global traits: A neo-Allportian approach to personality" (1991). Psychological Science, 2, 31–39. doi:10.1111/j.1467-9280.1991.tb00093.x.
- Funder & West (Eds.) "Consensus, self-other agreement, and accuracy in personality judgment: An introduction" (1993). Journal of Personality, 64, 457–476. doi:10.1111/j.1467-6494.1993.tb00778.x.
- Funder, Parke, Tomlinson-Keasey, & Widaman (Eds.) Studying lives through time: Approaches to personality and development (1993). Washington, DC: American Psychological Association. doi:10.1037/10127-000.
- "On the accuracy of personality judgement: A realistic approach" (1995). Psychological Review, 102, 652–670. doi:10.1037/0033-295x.102.4.652.
- Personality judgment: A realistic approach to person perception (1999). San Diego, CA: Academic Press. ISBN 978-0122699306.
- The Personality Puzzle (1997). 1st edition. New York: Norton.
  - 2nd edition: 2000, ISBN 978-0393975413.
  - 3rd edition: 2004, ISBN 978-0393979961.
  - 4th edition: 2007, ISBN 978-0393928587.
  - 5th edition: 2010, ISBN 978-0393933482.
  - 6th edition: 2012, ISBN 978-0393913118.
  - 7th edition: 2015, ISBN 978-0393265149.
  - 8th edition: 2019, ISBN 978-0393421781.
  - 9th edition: 2024, ISBN 978-1324060543.
- Funder & Ozer. "Evaluating effect size in psychological research: Sense and nonsense" (2019). Advances in Methods and Practices in Psychological Science, 2, 156–168. doi:10.1177/2515245919847202.

== Personal life ==
Funder met his wife, Patricia Mayhew, while working at Harvey Mudd College in the early 1980s. They have two daughters.
