= Heejung Kim =

Social Psychologist

- Education: Stanford University (Ph.D., 2001); Stanford University (Master of Arts); University of Southern California (Bachelor of Arts); Ewha Womans University (Bachelor of Arts)
- Scientific career
- Fields: Social Psychology
- Workplaces: Harvey Mudd & University of Southern California
- Thesis: Speech and silence: a cultural analysis of the effect of talking on psychology (2001)
- Doctoral advisor: Hazel Rose Markus

Heejung Kim is a South Korean psychologist and a professor in the Department of Psychological & Brain Sciences at the University of California, Santa Barbara. Her research focuses on how culture influences humans' thought process. She is co-editor of the journal Personality and Social Psychology Review.

== Career ==
Kim received her first Bachelors of Arts degree in French Literature from Ewha Womans University in Seoul, Korea. She earned a second Bachelor of Arts degree in Psychology from the University of Southern California. She completed her Masters of Arts and PhD program in Social Psychology at Stanford University in 2001. In 2002, she began working at Harvey Mudd College as an assistant professor of Humanities and Social Sciences. In 2003, she accepted the position of assistant professor at the University of California, Santa Barbara (UCSB), where she currently works as a professor in the Department of Psychological and Brain Sciences. Kim directs the Cultural Psychology Lab at UCSB where she investigates how one's culture can shape psychological processes, decision making, religion, biology, and interpersonal communication. She is a collaborator for the UCLA Social Neuroscience Lab.

Kim has worked for several publications. She worked as an associate editor for the Personality and Social Psychology Bulletin (PSPB), and was on the editorial board of Psychological Science in 2011. From 2012 to 2014, she was the associate editor at the Journal of Personality and Social Psychology (JPSP). Kim is currently a consulting editor for the Interpersonal Relations and Group Processes Section in JPSP. From 2018 to 2021, Kim will be holding the role of co-editor at Personality and Social Psychology Review with her UCSB colleague, professor David Sherman.

Kim has held multiple positions at the Society for Personality and Social Psychology such as being a symposium reviewer for the Convention: Program Committee in 2011 and an adjunct member of the fellows committee in 2015. Since 2016, Kim has been a member of the Summer Institute for Social Psychology and Personality and was recently promoted to co-chair of this committee in 2019. She was also a mentor for the 2016 Summer Program for Undergraduate Research.

== Research ==
Kim has authored and co-authored more than 90 scientific publications which appeared in multiple renowned journals such as the JPSP, Psychological Science, PSPB, and Proceedings of the National Academy of Sciences.

Her research mostly focuses on a cultural explanation for human behaviors. One of her studies explores how cultural preferences toward uniqueness and conformity differ between East Asians and Americans. Another study discusses the cultural differences between Asians and Asian Americans group and European Americans group in how each sought and used social support. Her most recent publication focuses on a sociocultural approach to understand the motivations behind pro-environmental actions.

=== Research in news ===
Kim's research has been quoted in multiple mainstream and scientific outlets, including Psychology Today, Yahoo News, Wired Magazine, and Psych Central.

Her work on the oxytocin receptor gene OXTR has been covered by Ed Yong in Discover magazine. Previous research had shown that people with certain versions of the OXTR gene are more social and more likely to seek social support during times of stress; however, Kim's work suggests that this effect may be culturally specific. In her work, Americans showed this pattern, but in Koreans the "social" version of the OXTR gene was not associated with social support seeking (and the pattern suggested less social support seeking in distressed Koreans with this version of OXTR). Koreans tend to have concerns about overburdening friends and family with their problems and thus are less likely to seek social support during stress, whereas Americans are more likely to seek social support. Kim suggests that instead this version of OXTR may be related to adherence to social norms.

== Grants and awards ==
The National Science Foundation has granted Kim and her co-researchers over a million dollars in research funding. Funded projects include: Sociocultural Determinants of Human Motives, Oxytocin and Socio-Emotional Sensitivity: Mechanisms of Gene-Culture Interaction, RAPID: The Psychology of Fear: Cultural Orientation and Response to Ebola Threat, Culture, Social Support, and Managing Stress, and DHB: Collaborative Research: Cultural and Genetic Basis of Social Support Use.

Kim is the recipient of the 2002 Dissertation Award given by the Society of Experimental Social Psychology (SESP). In 2013, her University of California, Santa Barbara advisee, Joni Sasaki, also won the SESP Dissertation Award, making it the second time in 41 years that both mentor and advisee were awarded this prestigious title. Kim was described as one of the Revolutionary Minds in science by Seed Magazine (August 2008) and was a top-cited assistant professor in Social Psychology (Dialogue, Fall, 2007). Kim became an SPSP fellow in 2012.
