= Shigehiro Oishi =

Japanese Psychologist

Shigehiro "Shige" Oishi
- Education: University of Illinois (PhD) Columbia University (MA) International Christian University (BA)
- Known for: Happiness, culture, meaning, psychological richness
- Awards: American Academy of Arts and Sciences (2023) Wegner Theoretical Innovation Prize (2022) Outstanding Achievement Award for Advancing Cultural Psychology (2021) Society for Personality and Social Psychology, Midcareer Award (2018) Society of Experimental Social Psychology, Career Trajectory Award (2017)
- Scientific career
- Doctoral advisor: Ed Diener

Shigehiro "Shige" Oishi is a Japanese psychologist and author. He is the Marshall Field IV Distinguished Service Professor of Psychology at the University of Chicago, and an elected member of the American Academy of Arts and Sciences.

Oishi is considered a foremost authority on happiness, meaning, and culture. Named one of the most cited personality and social psychologists in 2011, Oishi's research program is distinctive in its methodological range and ingenuity as well as its broad theoretical reach. He has published 200+ journal articles and book chapters across his career with over 100,000 citations. He is the author of the popular books, Life in Three Dimensions and「幸せを科学する」"Doing The Science of Happiness."

He has been awarded two major mid-career awards in social psychology: The Career Trajectory Award from the Society of Experimental Social Psychology in 2017 and the Diener Award from the Society for Personality and Social Psychology in 2018. In 2021, he also received the Outstanding Achievement Award for Advancing Cultural Psychology from SPSP. The Psychological Review paper on a psychologically rich life he co-authored with Erin Westgate received the 2022 Wegner Theoretical Innovation Prize. His research has been featured in major media outlets, including The New York Times, The Washington Post, The Wall Street Journal, and The Financial Times.

== Biography ==
Oishi received his B.A. in Psychology at the International Christian University in Tokyo. He immigrated to the United States to receive his Ed. M in Counseling Psychology at Teachers College, Columbia University. He then received his Ph.D. in Social-Personality Psychology at the University of Illinois at Urbana-Champaign in 2000, where he worked with Ed Diener, a pioneer in subjective well-being research. Oishi taught at the University of Minnesota (2000–2004), Columbia University (2018–2020), and the University of Virginia (2004–2018; 2020–2022) before joining the University of Chicago in 2022.

== Research ==
Throughout his career, Oishi has conducted extensive research on subjective well-being. He is notable for his work on cross-cultural differences in happiness, including Oishi et al. (2013), which explored the cultural and historical variations in concepts of happiness. Using dictionary definitions from 30 different nations, the study found that happiness was most frequently defined as good luck and favorable external conditions. While this was the case as well in the United States historically, over time, this definition was replaced by definitions focused on favorable internal feeling states.

Oishi has published a number of articles on the relationship between money and happiness. Oishi et al. (2022) found that the income-happiness correlation grew stronger as income inequality increases. Oishi's prior research on income inequality and happiness found that Americans were on average happier in the years with less national income inequality than in the years with more national income inequality. Moreover, nations with more progressive taxation on income had higher levels of subjective well-being (Oishi, Schimmack, & Diener, 2011).

While happiness has many benefits, Oishi, Diener, & Lucas (2007) investigated optimum levels of happiness and whether there might be such thing as too much happiness. The study found that people who experience the highest levels of happiness are the most successful in terms of close relationships and volunteer work, but that those who experience slightly lower levels of happiness are the most successful in terms of income, education, and political participation.

Oishi has also conducted research on meaning in life. His student, Michael Steger, developed the Meaning in Life Questionnaire, which has been cited over 6,500 times. Oishi & Diener (2014) found that residents of poor nations have a greater sense of meaning in life than residents of wealthy nations. The findings suggest that meaning stems from residents' strong family ties and solid connections to religious tradition.

Oishi's research on happiness, meaning, and the "good life" led him to develop the concept of psychological richness. While psychological science has typically conceptualized a good life in terms of either hedonic (happiness) or eudaimonic (meaning) well-being, Oishi proposed psychological richness as a third dimension of a good life. A psychologically rich life is characterized by a variety of interesting and perspective-changing experiences. Oishi's research on a psychologically rich life has garnered academic acclaim and widespread media attention.

Another topic of Oishi's research is residential mobility. His research investigated the impact of moving as a child into adulthood, finding that the more times a child moved, the lower their well-being levels were as an adult. However, personality also played an important role; introverts had a tougher time handling childhood moves, an effect explained by a lower number of close social relationships. Introverts who moved as a child were also more likely to have died during the 10-year follow up in the study. People who have lived for a long time in one place are more likely to engage in prosocial behaviors that help their community. Residing in one place leads to a greater attachment to the community, more interdependence with one's neighbors, and a greater concern with one's reputation in the community. Residents of stable communities purchased a "critical habitat" license plate to support preservation of the environment in their home state more often than did residents of mobile communities. Oishi et al. (2007) found that home game baseball attendance was less dependent on the team's record in stable cities than in mobile cities, a finding that was replicated in Japan (Oishi et al. 2009). Oishi et al. (2007) found that this increase in helping can arise quite quickly, even in a one-time laboratory setting. Across four tasks, participants were randomly assigned to either remain together and work on all tasks throughout the study or to switch to a new group after each task. People in the "stable community" condition were more likely to help their struggling companion than were people in the "transient" group condition. The effect of stability on helping was explained in part by sense of community.

Building on his work on residential mobility, Oishi also re-introduced the socio-ecological perspective to psychology. His research on socioecological psychology investigates humans' cognitive, emotional, and behavioral adaption to physical, interpersonal, economic, and political environments. For example, he found that walkability of the city a child grew up in predicted their likelihood of achieving the American Dream. Holding other factors constant, the higher level of walkability in the city a child grew up in, the higher rates of upward mobility. This effect of walkability on upward mobility in part was explained by sense of belonging; higher levels of belonging were reported in more walkable cities.

Oishi received a NIMH grant to research felt understanding and misunderstanding. Oishi, Lun, & Sherman (2013) found that a higher sense of understanding enabled participants to have higher tolerance for pain (keeping their hand in ice-cold water for longer amounts of time). Mallett, Akimoto, & Oishi (2016) found that cross-race interactions generated lower levels of positive affect than same-race interactions, but similar levels of negative affect. This difference in positive affect was explained by length of acquaintanceship.
