= Keith Maddox =

American social psychologist

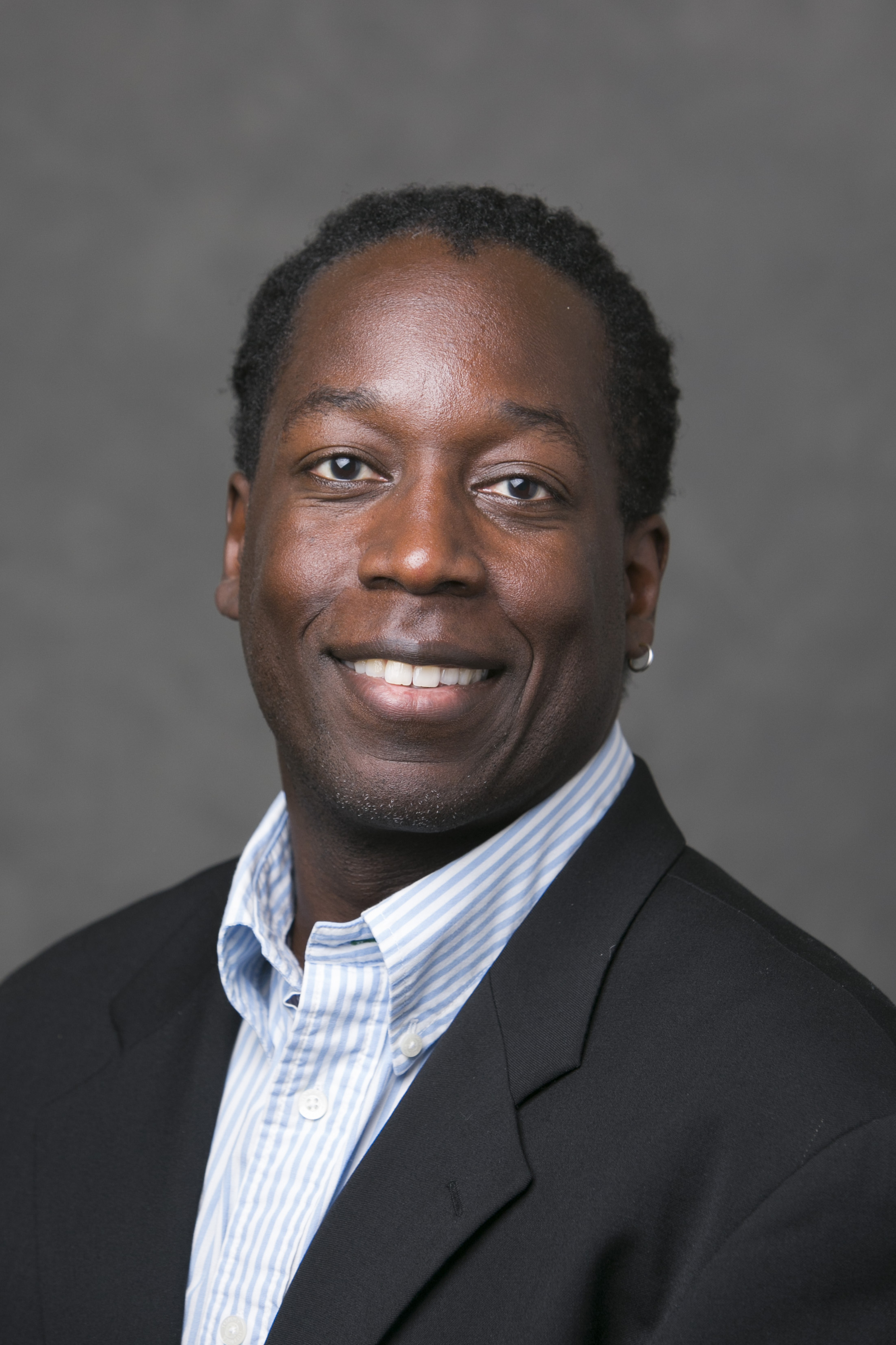
- Education: University of Michigan (AB) University of California, Santa Barbara (MA, PhD)
- Scientific career
- Fields: Psychology
- Workplaces: Tufts University
- Website: https://as.tufts.edu/psychology/tusc-lab

Keith Maddox is a professor in the department of psychology at Tufts University. Maddox's research focuses on social cognition, and he is the director of the Tufts University Social Cognition Lab.

== Education ==
Maddox received his A.B. in psychology from the University of Michigan in 1991. Maddox received his M.A. and PhD in social psychology from the University of California, Santa Barbara in 1994 and 1998, respectively.

== Research ==
Maddox was a lecturer at Tufts University from 1997 to 1998. He became an assistant professor in the department of psychology in 1998, and received tenure and promotion to an associate professor in 2004. He is currently a professor of psychology at Tufts University and the Co-Director of the Diversity, Equity, Inclusion, and Justice Leadership Program at Tufts University. Maddox is also the director of the Tufts University Social Cognition Lab.

Maddox's research focuses on social cognition, particularly in relation to stereotyping, prejudice, and discrimination. Maddox studies racial phenotypicality bias, how the variation of appearance in a racial group affects the types or degree of stereotypes people have toward them. Maddox is also interested in understanding how people discuss race and racial bias and ways to encourage such discussion.

Maddox is currently an editor at Social Cognition, and on the editorial boards for Frontiers in Social Psychology (2023–), Personality and Social Psychology Bulletin (2021–), Psychological Bulletin (2020–), and The Journal of Black Psychology (2002–).

== Selected articles ==
Keith B Maddox (1 January 2004). "Perspectives on racial phenotypicality bias". Personality and Social Psychology Review. 8 (4): 383–401. doi:10.1207/s15327957pspr0804_4. ISSN 1088-8683. PMID 15582860. Wikidata Q35975384.

Travis L. Dixon; Keith B. Maddox (August 2005). "Skin Tone, Crime News, and Social Reality Judgments: Priming the Stereotype of the Dark and Dangerous Black Criminal1". Journal of Applied Social Psychology. 35 (8): 1555–1570. doi:10.1111/j.1559-1816.2005.tb02184.x. ISSN 0021-9029. Wikidata Q63285618.

Jaclyn Ronquillo; Thomas F Denson; Brian Lickel; Zhong-Lin Lu; Anirvan Nandy; Keith B Maddox (1 March 2007). "The effects of skin tone on race-related amygdala activity: an fMRI investigation". Social Cognitive and Affective Neuroscience. 2 (1): 39–44. doi:10.1093/scan/nsl043. ISSN 1749-5016. PMC 2555431. PMID 18985117. Wikidata Q36913138.

Jennifer R. Schultz; Keith B. Maddox (31 January 2013). "Shooting the messenger to spite the message? Exploring reactions to claims of racial bias". Personality and Social Psychology Bulletin. 39 (3): 346–358. doi:10.1177/0146167212475223. ISSN 0146-1672. PMID 23376888. Wikidata Q43649167.

== Awards and honors ==
- Jenessa Shapiro Award for Contributions to Diversity, and Inclusion, Society for Personality and Social Psychology (2021).
- Fellow, Association for Psychological Science (2020).
- Fellow, Society for the Psychological Study of Social Issues (2018).
- Fellow, Society for Personality and Social Psychology (2017).
- Fellow, Society of Experimental Social Psychology (2006).
