= M. Lynne Cooper =

American psychologist and academic

- Education: University of California, Santa Cruz
- Occupations: Professor in Psychology, University of Missouri, Columbia

M. Lynne Cooper is the Curators' Distinguished Professor of Psychology at the University of Missouri. She is known for her research on risk-taking and psychological adjustment of adolescents, young adults, and couples. Many of her studies and published works are related to alcohol, substance use, and sexual activity in adolescents and young adults at the transition to adulthood. Other influential research has examined health outcomes of parents who experience stress due to conflicts between work and family responsibilities.

Cooper is the 2018 president-elect of the Society for Personality and Social Psychology. She is the editor of the Journal of Personality and Social Psychology: Personality Processes and Individual Differences. She previously served as associate editor of the American Psychologist and Personality and Social Psychology Review.

== Biography ==
Cooper received her Ph.D. in psychology from the University of California, Santa Cruz in 1987. Prior to joining the faculty of the Department of Psychology at the University of Missouri, Cooper conducted research at the Research Institute on Alcoholism, Buffalo, NY and was a member of the Psychology Department at the State University of New York at Buffalo. Her research program has been funded through grants from the National Institute on Alcohol Abuse and Alcoholism and the National Institute on Mental Health.

== Selected research ==
M. Lynne Cooper is known for her work examining the role of alcohol in adolescent decision making in risky situations, and the influence of social factors, including family structure on alcohol use. In an influential study, Cooper and her colleagues used surveys to identify relationships between sexual behavior and alcohol consumption and whether it varied by gender and race/ethnicity. They obtained information about adolescent sexual activity, which included age of sexual debut, frequency of sex with strangers, one-night stands, and number of sexual partners in the prior half-year. A separate survey tracked alcohol use and included the frequency of alcohol consumption, its heavy use over the prior 6-month period, and alcohol problems. They observed that, on average, youth initiated sexual activity at 15.5 years of age, while initiating alcohol consumption at 16.4 years of age. Males engaged in sexual behavior about a year earlier than females, and blacks engaged earlier than other race/ethnicities. Adolescent males exhibited a strong correlation between alcohol use and risky sexual behaviors, whereas this relationship emerged later in females. Cooper's team focused on five personality traits including communal orientation, agency, negative emotionality, impulsivity, and sexual venturesomeness that might be related to risky behavior in adolescents. Communal orientation referred to the tendency to be agreeable and attentive to others; this trait was associated with having a committed relationship, seeking partners who are trustworthy, and meeting personal intimacy goals. Agency was characterized by confidence in social settings and having a primary focus on oneself rather than others. Individuals high in agency often displayed low risk behaviors during sex because of their ability to engage in discussion with their partner, yet also displayed greater inclination to consume alcohol. Negative emotionality led individuals to take more risks with the intention of alleviating their emotions. Impulsivity referred to the tendency to focus on attaining immediate benefit, rather than delaying gratification. Sexual venturesomeness was characterized by extraversion and desire for variety in sexual interactions; individuals who scored high on this trait tended to avoid safe, precautionary measures.

In other work, Cooper and her colleagues investigated the motivations to consume alcohol of 393 "community-recruited drinkers." They distinguished four types of motivation to use alcohol: self-focused enhancement, self-focused avoidance, social approach, and social avoidance. Self-focused enhancement was observed in individuals who drank for the pleasure and excitement of being drunk. Self-focused avoidance was observed in individuals who drank to negate distress or negative emotions. Social approach motives referred to the experience of interacting more freely after consuming alcohol. Social avoidance motives referred to drinking for the purpose of being accepted and avoiding social exclusion. Cooper's team had each participant keep a diary of each time they drank and tracked it in relation to their motivations and whether the experience of drinking induced pleasure, relief, or worse feelings than beforehand. They observed that self-focused enhancement led drinkers to conceive each progressive drink as more pleasurable than the last. In addition, participants with self-focused avoidance motives conceived each drink to be more relieving. These results provided insight into reasons why people often tend to drink excessively.

== Representative publications ==
- Cooper, M. L. (1994). "Motivations for alcohol use among adolescents: Development and validation of a four-factor model". Psychological Assessment. 6 (2): 117–128. doi:10.1037/1040-3590.6.2.117.
- Cooper, M. L.; Frone, M. R.; Russell, M.; Mudar, P. (1995). "Drinking to regulate positive and negative emotions: a motivational model of alcohol use". Journal of Personality and Social Psychology. 69 (5): 990–1005. doi:10.1037/0022-3514.69.5.990. PMID 7473043.
- Cooper, M. L.; Shaver, P. R.; Collins, N. L. (1998). "Attachment styles, emotion regulation, and adjustment in adolescence". Journal of Personality and Social Psychology. 74 (5): 1380–1397. doi:10.1037/0022-3514.74.5.1380. PMID 9599450.
- Frone, M. R.; Russell, M.; Cooper, M. L. (1992). "Antecedents and outcomes of work-family conflict: testing a model of the work-family interface". Journal of Applied Psychology. 77 (1): 65–78. doi:10.1037/0021-9010.77.1.65. PMID 1556042.
