= Kerry Kawakami =

Canadian social psychologist

Kerry Kawakami is a Canadian social psychologist. She is a professor of social psychology at York University in Toronto. She is the current editor of Journal of Personality and Social Psychology (JPSP): Interpersonal Relations and Group Processes. Kawakami's research focuses on developing strategies to reduce intergroup bias.

== Career ==
Kawakami graduated from University of Amsterdam and received her Ph.D. in psychology from University of Toronto. As a professor at York University, she heads the Social Cognition Lab, which investigates social categorization processes. Kawakami's work on stereotyping and intergroup bias has led to her international recognition.

Kawakami is a fellow of the American Psychological Association (APA), the Canadian Psychological Association (CPA), and the Society for Personality and Social Psychology (SPSP). She is an executive member of the International Social Cognition Network. As an editor at JPSP, she became the first woman of Asian descent to serve as editor of any APA journal.

== Aversive racism ==
In 2014, Kawakami conducted a study investigating aversive racism in Canada using eye tracking technology. Over one thousand white participants were shown images of white faces and black faces on a computer screen. Eye tracking data showed that the participants tended to focus more on the eyes of white faces and the lips and noses of black faces. Given the importance of eye contact in social interaction, this result indicates that the black faces shown were being processed as members of a group rather than as individuals.

Kawakami's work has also shown that people are more tolerant of racist actions than they claim. In one study, her team showed that although only 17% of people said they would be willing to partner with someone who made a racial slur, 63% of people who actually heard the slur subsequently partnered with that person.

== Selected works ==
=== Articles ===
- Friesen, J. P., Kawakami, K., Vingilis-Jaremko, L., Caprara, R., Sidhu, D., Williams, A., Hugenberg, K., Rodriguez-Bailon, R., Canadas, E., & Niedenthal, P. (2019). Perceiving happiness in an intergroup context: The role of race and attention to the eyes in differentiating between true and false smiles. Journal of Personality and Social Psychology, 116, 375–395.
- Phills, C. E., Kawakami, K., Krusemark, D. R., & Nyguen, J. (2019). Does reducing implicit prejudice increase outgroup identification? The downstream consequences of evaluative training on associations between the self and racial categories. Social Psychological and Personality Science, 10, 26–34.
- Kawakami, K., Friesen, J., & Vingilis-Jaremko, L. (2018). Visual Attention to Members of Own and Other Groups: Preferences, Determinants, and Consequences. Social Personality Psychology Compass, 12(312480), 1–16.

=== Books ===
- Kawakami, K. (Ed.). (2014). The psychology of prejudice (Four volume set). London: Sage.
