= Jeffrey Sherman =

Social psychologist and professor of psychology

- Born: May 8, 1967 (age 59); Ann Arbor, Michigan
- Citizenship: U.S.
- Education: University of California, Berkeley (BA); University of California, Santa Barbara (PhD)
- Known for: social cognition, stereotyping, and implicit bias
- Scientific career
- Fields: Psychology (Social)
- Workplaces: University of California, Davis, Northwestern University

Jeffrey Sherman (born May 8, 1967) is a Social Psychologist and Professor of Psychology at the University of California, Davis. He is known for his research on social cognition, stereotyping, and implicit bias.

== Biography ==
Sherman was born in Ann Arbor, Michigan and grew up in Bloomington, Indiana. He earned his BA in psychology at the University of California, Berkeley in 1989 and his PhD in psychology at the University of California, Santa Barbara in 1994, where he worked with David Hamilton (primary advisor), Diane Mackie, and Stanley Klein. In 1994, he accepted a position as assistant professor at Northwestern University, where he was promoted to associate professor with tenure in 2000. Since 2005, he is professor of psychology at the University of California, Davis.

Sherman served as the president of the International Social Cognition Network in 2006 and the president of the Society for Experimental Social Psychology in 2019.

== Research ==
Sherman's research investigates the cognitive processes underlying social judgments and behavior. Much of this work examines the psychology of stereotypes and prejudice. His most influential research addresses these broad topics:

- The Mental Representation of Social Knowledge: The extent to which social judgments are based on specific behaviors or individuals versus abstract schemas or stereotypes.
- Stereotype Efficiency: The ways in which stereotypes influence impression formation processes to maximize efficient social perception.
- Stereotype Inhibition: The ways in which people are able to effectively inhibit the influence of stereotypes and the conditions under which inhibition is most likely to be effective.
- Stereotype Formation: How fundamental learning mechanisms, particularly those related to attention, contribute to stereotype formation and the content of stereotypes.
- Underlying Mechanisms of Implicit Bias: Using formal mathematical modeling techniques to identify the processes that produce or diminish implicit bias.

== Honors and awards ==
- 2000: Elected Fellow in Recognition of Substantial Contributions to Social Psychology, Society for Experimental Social Psychology
- 2000: Elected Fellow in Recognition of Significant Contributions to Psychological Science, Psychonomic Society
- 2005: Daniel M. Wegner Theoretical Innovation Prize, Society for Personality and Social Psychology
- 2007: Elected Fellow in Recognition of Sustained and Outstanding Contributions to Psychological Science, Association for Psychological Science
- 2009: Best Paper Award, International Social Cognition Network
- 2010: Elected Fellow in Recognition of Outstanding Contributions to Personality and Social Psychology, Society for Personality and Social Psychology
- 2010: Elected Fellow in Recognition of Significant Contributions to the Science of Psychology, Western Psychological Association
- 2010: UC Davis Social Sciences Dean's Research Innovation Award
- 2013: Anneliese Maier Research Award, Alexander von Humboldt Foundation, German Federal Ministry of Education

== Representative publications ==
Books

- Sherman, J. W., Gawronski, B., & Trope, Y. (Eds.). (2014). Dual process theories of the social mind. New York: Guilford Press.

Journal articles

- Calanchini, J., Rivers, A. M., Klauer, K. C., & Sherman, J. W. (2018). Multinomial processing trees as theoretical bridges between cognitive and social psychology. Psychology of Learning and Motivation, 69, 39-65.
- Calanchini, J., & Sherman, J. W. (2013). Implicit attitudes reflect associative, non-associative, and non-attitudinal processes. Social and Personality Psychology Compass, 7, 654-667.
- Conrey, F. R., Sherman, J. W., Gawronski, B., Hugenberg, K., & Groom, C. (2005). Separating multiple processes in implicit social cognition: The Quad-Model of implicit task performance. Journal of Personality and Social Psychology, 89, 469-487.
- Damian, R. I., & Sherman, J. W. (2013). A process-dissociation examination of the cognitive processes underlying unconscious thought. Journal of Experimental Social Psychology, 49, 228-237.
- Ferreira, M. B., Garcia-Marques, L., Sherman, S. J., & Sherman, J. W. (2006). Automatic and controlled components of judgment and decision making. Journal of Personality and Social Psychology, 91, 797-813.
- Gonsalkorale, K., Sherman, J. W., Allen, T. J., Klauer, K. C., & Amodio, D. M. (2011). Accounting for successful control of implicit racial bias: The roles of association activation, response monitoring, and overcoming bias. Personality and Social Psychology Bulletin, 37, 1534-1545.
- Gonsalkorale, K., Sherman, J. W., & Klauer, K. C. (2009). Aging and prejudice: Diminished regulation of automatic race bias among older adults. Journal of Experimental Social Psychology, 45, 410-414.
- Halberstadt, J., Sherman, S. J., & Sherman, J. W. (2011). Why Barack Obama is black: A cognitive account of hypodescent. Psychological Science, 22, 29-33.
- Huang, L. M., & Sherman, J. W. (2018). Attentional processes in social perception. Advances in Experimental Social Psychology, 58, 199-241.
- Krieglmeyer, R., & Sherman, J. W. (2012). Disentangling stereotype activation and stereotype application in the Stereotype Misperception Task. Journal of Personality and Social Psychology, 103, 205-224.
- Monteith, M. J., Sherman, J. W., & Devine, P. G. (1998). Suppression as a stereotype control strategy. Personality and Social Psychology Review, 2, 63-82.
- Rees, H. R., Ma, D. S., & Sherman, J. W. (2020). Examining the relationships among categorization, stereotype activation, and stereotype application. Personality and Social Psychology Bulletin, 46, 499-513.
- Rivers, A. M., Sherman, J. W., Rees, H. R., Reichardt, R., & Klauer, K. C. (2020). On the roles of stereotype activation and application in diminishing implicit bias. Personality and Social Psychology Bulletin, 46, 349-364.
- Sherman, J. W. (1996). Development and mental representation of stereotypes. Journal of Personality and Social Psychology, 70, 1126-1141.
- Sherman, J. W. & Bessenoff, G. R. (1999). Stereotypes as source monitoring cues: On the interaction between episodic and semantic memory. Psychological Science, 10, 106-110.
- Sherman, J. W., Gawronski, B., Gonsalkorale, K., Hugenberg, K., Allen, T. J., & Groom, C. J. (2008). The self-regulation of automatic associations and behavioral impulses. Psychological Review, 115, 314-335.
- Sherman, J.W. & Klein, S.B. (1994). The development and representation of personality impressions. Journal of Personality and Social Psychology, 67, 972-983.
- Sherman, J. W., Kruschke, J. K., Sherman, S. J., Percy, E. J., Petrocelli, J. V., & Conrey, F. R. (2009). Attentional processes in stereotype formation: A common model for category accentuation and illusory correlation. Journal of Personality and Social Psychology, 96, 305-323.
- Sherman, J. W., Lee, A. Y., Bessenoff, G. R., & Frost, L. A. (1998). Stereotype efficiency reconsidered: Encoding flexibility under cognitive load. Journal of Personality and Social Psychology, 75, 589-606.
- Sherman, J. W., Macrae, C. N., & Bodenhausen, G. V. (2000). Attention and stereotyping: Cognitive constraints on the construction of meaningful social impressions. European Review of Social Psychology, 11, 145-175.
- Sherman, J. W., & Rivers, A. M. (2020). Social priming: A dubious term. Nature, 579, 29.
- Sherman, J. W., Stroessner, S. J., Conrey, F. R., & Azam, O. (2005). Prejudice and stereotype maintenance processes: Attention, attribution, and individuation. Journal of Personality and Social Psychology, 89, 607-622.

Chapters

- Hamilton, D.L. & Sherman, J.W. (1994). Stereotypes. In R.S. Wyer, Jr., & T.K. Srull (Eds.) Handbook of Social Cognition (2nd Ed., Vol. 2, pp. 1-68). Hillsdale, NJ: Erlbaum.
- Roese, N. J. & Sherman, J. W. (2007). Expectancy. In E. T. Higgins & A. W. Kruglanski (Eds.), Social psychology: Handbook of basic principles (2nd Ed., pp. 91-115). New York: Guilford Press.
