= Helson =

Helson is a surname. Notable people with the surname include:

- Harry Helson (1898–1977), American psychologist
- Henry Helson (1927–2010), American mathematician
- Julie Chapman nee Helson, New Zealand charity founder
- Ravenna Helson (1925–2020), American psychologist, wife of Henry

== See also ==
- Gelson
- Helton (name)
- Henson (name)
