= Evan Apfelbaum =

American academic

- Known for: Diversity and intergroup relations Organizational behavior

Academic background
- Education: Union College (B.S.); Tufts University (Ph.D.)

Evan P. Apfelbaum is an American academic and Full Professor of Management & Organizations at the Boston University Questrom School of Business. His research examines diversity, intergroup relations, and organizational behavior.

== Early life and education ==
Apfelbaum earned a B.S. in psychology and music, magna cum laude, from Union College, New York. He went on to complete a Ph.D. in social psychology at Tufts University in 2009.

== Academic career ==
Following his doctorate, Apfelbaum held a postdoctoral fellowship at the Kellogg Team and Group Research Center at Northwestern University’s Kellogg School of Management, where he also served as a Visiting assistant professor of Management and Organizations.

In 2011, he joined the MIT Sloan School of Management as an assistant professor of Work and Organization Studies. He later held the W. Maurice Young (1961) Career Development Professorship and was promoted to associate professor in 2017.

Apfelbaum moved to Boston University in 2018 as an associate professor of Management & Organizations at the Questrom School of Business, where he became a full Professor in 2025. At BU, he has served on the university's 2030 Strategic Planning Task Force and as Research Director of the HR Policy Institute.

== Research ==
Apfelbaum's research examines Intergroup relations, diversity ideologies, and Organizational behavior. His work uses approaches from experimental, developmental, and social psychology to study the effects of group membership, identity, and social norms on behavior.

One focus of his scholarship is diversity ideologies, including comparisons of colorblind and multicultural approaches to diversity. He has also studied how children develop concepts of race, stereotype awareness, and beliefs about the changeability of prejudice.

In organizational settings, Apfelbaum has analyzed the influence of norms and transparency, including how the disclosure of diversity metrics affects perceptions of equity and inclusion. His work also addresses group processes such as Conformity, shared attention, and responses to perceived intent.

== Honors and recognition ==
- Early Researcher Award, American Psychological Association (2006)
- Gordon Allport Intergroup Relations Prize by Society for the Psychological Study of Social Issues (Honorable Mention, 2009)
- Admired Scholar Award, Society for Personality and Social Psychology (2014)
- Elected Fellow of the Society of Experimental Social Psychology (2014)
- Named among Poets & Quants' Top 40 Business Professors Under 40 (2017)
- Elected Fellow of the Society for Personality and Social Psychology (2021)
