= William Revelle =

American academic

- Born: 1944 (age 81–82)
- Occupation: Professor
- Father: Roger Revelle
- Scientific career
- Education: Pomona College; University of Michigan
- Fields: Personality psychology, Differential psychology
- Workplaces: Northwestern University
- Thesis: Introversion/extraversion, Skin Conductance And Performance Under Stress (1973)
- Website: revelle.net

William Roger Revelle (born c. 1944) is a psychology professor at Northwestern University working in personality psychology. Revelle studies the biological basis of personality and motivation, psychometric theory, the structure of daily mood, and models of attention and memory.

== Early life and education ==
Revelle was raised in La Jolla, California. His father, Roger Revelle, was an early theorist in global warming.

Revelle graduated from Pomona College in 1965, abandoning a mathematics major in favor of psychology. He spent two years in Sarawak, Malaysia, as a volunteer in the Peace Corps before earning his PhD in psychology from the University of Michigan in 1973. He became a member of the Northwestern Faculty in 1973.

== Career ==
Revelle has previously served as the President (2005–2009) of the International Society for the Study of Individual Differences (ISSID), the President (2008–2009) of the Association for Research in Personality (ARP), and the President (1984) of the Society of Multivariate Experimental Psychology (SMEP).

Currently, he is vice-chair of the Governing Board of the Bulletin of the Atomic Scientists, having previously served as Chair (2009–2012). He also serves as the President (2018–present) of the International Society for Intelligence Research (ISIR).

Additionally, he is a Fellow of the American Association for the Advancement of Science (AAAS; 1996–present), the Association for Psychological Science (APS; 1994–present), the American Psychological Association (APA Division 5; 2011–present), and the Society for Personality and Social Psychology (SPSP; 2015–present).

He resides in Evanston, Illinois.

== Bibliography ==
=== Selected publications ===
- Revelle, William; Condon, David M. (2015). "A model for personality at three levels". Journal of Research in Personality. 56: 70–81. doi:10.1016/j.jrp.2014.12.006.
- Condon, David M.; Revelle, William (2014). "The International Cognitive Ability Resource: Development and initial validation of a public domain measure". Intelligence. 43: 52–64. doi:10.1016/j.intell.2014.01.004.
- Zinbarg, Richard E.; Revelle, William; Yovel, Iftah; Li, Wen (2005). "Cronbach's α, Revelle's β, and Mcdonald's ωH: their relations with each other and two alternative conceptualizations of reliability". Psychometrika. 70 (1): 123–133. doi:10.1007/s11336-003-0974-7. ISSN 0033-3123. S2CID 18206472.
- Revelle, W (1995). "Personality Processes". Annual Review of Psychology. 46 (1): 295–328. doi:10.1146/annurev.ps.46.020195.001455. ISSN 0066-4308.
- Humphreys, Michael S.; Revelle, William (1984). "Personality, motivation, and performance: a theory of the relationship between individual differences and information processing". Psychological Review. 91 (2): 153–84. doi:10.1037/0033-295X.91.2.153. PMID 6571423.
- Revelle, William; Humphreys, Michael S.; Simon, Lisa; Gilliland, Kirby (1980). "The interactive effect of personality, time of day, and caffeine: A test of the arousal model". Journal of Experimental Psychology: General. 109 (1): 1–31. doi:10.1037/0096-3445.109.1.1. ISSN 1939-2222. PMID 6445402.
- Revelle, William (1979). "Hierarchical Cluster Analysis And The Internal Structure Of Tests". Multivariate Behavioral Research. 14 (1): 57–74. doi:10.1207/s15327906mbr1401_4. ISSN 0027-3171. PMID 26766619.
- Revelle, William; Rocklin, Thomas (1979). "Very Simple Structure: An Alternative Procedure For Estimating The Optimal Number Of Interpretable Factors". Multivariate Behavioral Research. 14 (4): 403–414. doi:10.1207/s15327906mbr1404_2. ISSN 0027-3171. PMID 26804437.
- Revelle, W; Amaral, P; Turriff, S (1976). "Introversion/extroversion, time stress, and caffeine: effect on verbal performance". Science. 192 (4235): 149–150. Bibcode:1976Sci...192..149R. doi:10.1126/science.1257762. ISSN 0036-8075. PMID 1257762.

=== Software ===
- Revelle, William (2018). psych: Procedures for Psychological, Psychometric, and Personality Research. Evanston, Illinois.
