= Whole Trait Theory =

Expanded personality theory

Whole Trait Theory expands upon traditional personality theories by integrating social-cognitive processes like goals, motivations and interpretations to explain how traits manifest dynamically in behavior. Whole Trait Theory argues that traits are not static dispositions, but emerge instead from distributions of behavior states that vary based on internal cognitive processes and external contextual factors. Proposed by William Fleeson and Eranda Jayawickreme, Whole Trait Theory posits that personality traits are underpinned by dynamic psychological processes characterized by situational variability and emergent patterns of behavior. By conceptualizing traits as density distributions of states, Whole Trait Theory transcends traditional models to account for both the stability of personality and the contextual variability of behavior.

== Background ==
Personality trait theories like the Five-Factor Model typically emphasize behavioral consistency across time and place. Critics argue, however, that these models are not able to account for significant intra-individual variability observed across different situational contexts. The person-situation debate questioned whether behavior is primarily influenced by enduring traits or by situational factors. Social-cognitive theories account for situational variability but underrepresent emergent trait stability embodied in behavioral patterns. The need for an integrative approach that addressed these limitations became evident.

In 2001, Fleeson introduced the concept of traits as density distributions of states, proposing that 1) individual behavior is characterized by localized variability around a dynamic mean, and 2) behavioral states aggregate over time as (typically) normal distributions characterizing emergent trait-level consistency. Jayawickreme's research focused on the underlying psychological processes contributing to personality development and positive change. In 2015, the initial collaboration between these social scientists culminated in the formal articulation of Whole Trait Theory.

== Core concepts ==
The descriptive aspect of Whole Trait Theory conceptualizes personality traits as density distributions of states. Traits are viewed as distributions representing the frequency and intensity of various momentary behavioral states that an individual exhibits over time. This perspective acknowledges that while people display considerable variability in their daily actions, stable patterns emerge when these behaviors are aggregated. Measurement within this framework involves collecting and aggregating data on individuals' momentary states across different contexts and times. Experience sampling methods are commonly employed for this purpose, wherein participants report their thoughts, feelings, and behaviors in real time, often multiple times a day. Analysis of these data results in both local and global metrics, providing a nuanced portrayal of traits that captures coexistent consistency and fluctuation.

The explanatory aspect of Whole Trait Theory integrates cognitive, affective, and motivational processes to elucidate how and why traits are expressed in behavior. Underlying psychosocial mechanisms like goals, motivations, beliefs, and interpretations underlie emergent patterns observed in the descriptive aspect. These mechanisms influence momentary states that, over time, form density distributions that represent traits. By incorporating social-cognitive theories, the explanatory aspect accounts for the dynamic processes influencing behavior. For example, an individual's interpretation of a social event, their emotional responses, and their personal goals can affect how they act in a given context. This integration allows for a more comprehensive understanding of personality by explaining both the stability of traits and the situational variability of behavior.

== Methodology ==
Whole Trait Theory employs empirical methods designed to capture both the stability and variability of personality traits as they manifest in real-life contexts. A primary methodological approach is the experience sampling method (ESM), also known as ecological momentary assessment (EMA). This technique involves collecting data on individuals' thoughts, feelings, and behaviors in real time, multiple times a day over extended periods. Fleeson's seminal 2001 study prompted participants at random intervals to report their current behaviors and experiences, enabling the collection of in situ data that reflected the dynamic nature of personality. A 2009 meta-analysis provided robust evidence to support Whole Trait Theory's core precepts, finding that traits like extraversion show high stability at the aggregate level and significant variability within individuals across different contexts. Subsequent ESM-based research has explored underlying psychological processes that contribute to trait expression, examining how cognitive appraisals and emotional responses influence the manifestation of traits. Statistical analyses in Whole Trait Theory research often involve multilevel modeling techniques. Density distribution analyses provide a comprehensive understanding of personality by illustrating not just average tendencies but also the range and variability of behaviors an individual exhibits.

== Empirical support ==
Empirical research has provided substantial support for Whole Trait Theory. Fleeson utilized experience sampling methods to generate real-time data on individual behavior and internal states over extended period of time. The findings supporting the concept of traits as density distributions of states by demonstrating that individuals exhibited significant variability in behavior across situations, while their aggregated behavior patterns remained remarkably stable over time. Fleeson and Gallagher conducted a meta-analysis of experience sampling studies involving over 800 participants. The analysis demonstrated that individuals' momentary expressions of trait-relevant behaviors varied widely, yet their mean levels of these behaviors were consistent, reinforcing the idea that traits represent stable patterns amid situational variability.

Fleeson and Jayawickreme explored the explanatory mechanisms underlying trait expression, examining how cognitive and motivational processes influence momentary behaviors and demonstrating that these underlying processes predict the expression of trait-relevant behaviors in specific contexts. Cross-cultural studies have also validated Whole Trait Theory's applicability across diverse populations, finding that the patterns of behavioral variability and trait stability proposed by the theory were evident across different cultures.

Whole Trait Theory has faced minimal direct criticism to this point, but several concerns are apparent. One point of contention is the opaque nature of underlying psychological mechanisms. While the descriptive aspect is supported by observable behavior patterns, the explanatory aspect involves internal processes that are more difficult to measure objectively. Some scholars question whether these internal mechanisms can be reliably quantified, raising concerns about the falsifiability of the theory.

== Applications ==
Whole Trait Theory has practical implications for many domains, including, but not limited to, personality assessment, clinical psychology, character education, and organizational behavior. The theory upends traditional personality assessment by demonstrating how traditional methods fail to capture the true complexity of personality. Incorporating dynamic assessment tools that account for situational variability lead to more accurate depictions of personality and character In clinical psychology, Whole Trait Theory offers new ways to understand and treat of personality disorders. Recognizing that traits are dynamically generated by underlying psychological processes allows clinicians to develop interventions targeting these processes. For character educators, Whole Trait Theory represents an alternative view of virtues and values as both dynamic and consistent. The theory is also relevant in organizational behavior and leadership contexts. For instance, understanding how personality and character trait expression are tied to specific professional contexts could provide insight into employee behavior and performance.

== Comparison with other theories ==
Whole Trait Theory distinguishes itself from other personality theories by integrating both the descriptive aspects of traits and the underlying psychological processes that generate behavior. Compared to the Five-Factor Model, which primarily offers a descriptive account of personality, Whole Trait Theory extends beyond description by incorporating social-cognitive processes, engaging questions about how and why traits are manifest in specific behaviors.

Social-cognitive personality theories such as Mischel's Cognitive-Affective Personality System (CAPS) emphasize the role of situational variables and cognitive processes in shaping behavior, highlighting the behavioral variability across contexts. While social-cognitive models provide critical insights into the dynamic nature of personality and character traits, they may underrepresent the emergence of consistency. By conceptualizing stability and variability as complementary rather than contradictory, Whole Trait Theory is designed to bridge this gap. It also has implications for dynamic systems theory, which perceives personality as a complex, adaptive system. While dynamic systems and whole trait perspectives both emphasize the emergence of patterns from dynamic interactions, Whole Trait Theory provides a more specific, person-centered framework for understanding the mechanisms that produce trait-based behavior.

== Current trends ==
Recent work within the domain of Whole Trait Theory has studied mechanisms underlying cognitive processes like motivation and mindfulness Other scholars have leveraged the theory to gain insights into relational development and organizational behavior. Such line of inquiry may inform interventions targeting intentional personality development and self-optimization. Another current trend seeks insight into character strengths such as intellectual humility, honesty, fairness, and social intelligence. Intellectual humility, for instance, is characterized as simultaneously dynamic and enduring, interacting with other virtues to shape character expression over time.
