= Fleeson =

Fleeson is a surname. Notable people with the surname include:

- Doris Fleeson (1901–1970), American journalist
- William Fleeson, American psychologist
