= Sandra L. Murray =

- Education: University of Waterloo
- Occupations: Professor, University at Buffalo, State University of New York

Sandra L. Murray is professor of psychology at the University at Buffalo, State University of New York. She is a social psychologist known for her work on close relationships and their trajectories over time. Murray received the American Psychological Association Award for Distinguished Scientific Early Career Contributions to Psychology (Area: Social Psychology) in 2003 for "distinguished and original contributions to an understanding of motivated social cognition in relationships." Other awards include the New Contribution Award from the International Society for the Study of Personal Relationships in 1998 and 2000, the Outstanding Early Career Award from the International Society for Self and Identity in 2000, the Career Trajectory Award from the Society of Experimental Social Psychology in 2012, the Mid-Career Distinguished Contribution Award from the International Association for Relationship Research in 2016, and the SUNY Chancellor's Award for Excellence in Scholarship and Creative Activities in 2020.

Murray received the Wegner Theoretical Innovation Award from the Society for Personality and Social Psychology in 2007 for collaborative work with John G. Holmes and Nancy Collins. Their theoretical paper titled Optimizing Assurance: The Risk Regulation System in Relationships provided a model of how people cope with the perceived risks of romantic relationships by balancing the need for intimacy and closeness with the need to minimize the risk of experiencing the pain of rejection. Murray's 1996 paper on the benefits of positive illusions in close relationships(with Holmes and Griffin as co-authors) received the Society of Experimental Social Psychology's Scientific Impact Award in 2021. The award honors highly influential contributions over the last 25 years. Murray and John Holmes are co-authors of the book Interdependent minds: The dynamics of close relationships, which is part of a book series on "Distinguished Contributions in Psychology" edited by Susan Fiske. This book introduces a motivation management model for understanding how romantic partners accommodate each other's needs for commitment, reciprocity, and responsiveness, and establish habitual ways of relating to one another. Murray and Holmes also authored the book Motivated cognition in relationships.

== Biography ==
Murray attended graduate school at the University at Waterloo in Canada where she received her Ph.D. in Psychology and began her long-term collaboration with Holmes. She completed a post-doctoral fellowship at the Research Center for Group Dynamics at the University of Michigan where she collaborated with Richard Gonzalez. Murray subsequently joined the faculty of the Department of Psychology at University at Buffalo where she directs the Interpersonal Processes Laboratory.

Murray's research program has been supported by various agencies including the Social Sciences and Humanities Research Council of Canada, the National Science Foundation, and the National Institute of Mental Health. Murray served as associate editor at the Journal of Experimental Social Psychology, Journal of Personality and Social Psychology, and Personality and Social Psychology Review.

== Research ==
Murray examines motivated reasoning, i.e., emotion-biased decision-making, in close relationships. Much of her work has focused on issues pertaining to trust, commitment, satisfaction, and self-esteem in romantic relationships, and the thoughts, feelings, and behaviors of the individuals involved and its effect on their relationships.

Murray and her colleagues have explored whether having an idealized view of one's romantic partner contributes to relationship satisfaction or whether it might set people up for disappointment. In one of their studies, participants were asked to rate their own interpersonal attributes as well as their partners. Participants often tended to view their partners in a more favorable manner than their partners viewed themselves. The authors suggested that a certain degree of idealization in one's partner is almost crucial for dating and marital satisfaction. If people view their partners in a more positive way, this can help maintain their confidence in the relationships, even after they have exhibited some doubt.

Other research has examined how self-esteem may impact the quality of romantic relationships. In one study, couples completed various measures which assessed their sense of self worth and how they perceived their partner, their partner's love for them, and the quality of their relationship. The findings indicated cascading effects of negative self-esteem on relationship quality. Individuals who struggled with self-doubt carried their uncertainty into their relationships and underrated their partner's love; this led to less favorable views of the partner, less satisfaction with the relationship, and more pessimistic views of its future than warranted by their partner's thoughts and feelings. Individuals with low self-worth may find themselves in unsuccessful relationships because of their inability to believe that someone who is worth it will be able to love them, and their inability to be positive about their future together. Murray and her colleagues suggest that loving and supportive partners can reassure such individuals of their love and even fade their insecurities to establish a closer and more satisfying relationship.

== Representative publications ==
- Murray, S. L., Holmes, J. G., & Griffin, D. W. (1996). The benefits of positive illusions: Idealization and the construction of satisfaction in close relationships. Journal of Personality and Social Psychology, 70(1), 79–98.
- Murray, S. L., Holmes, J. G., & Griffin, D. W. (2000). Self-esteem and the quest for felt security: how perceived regard regulates attachment processes. Journal of Personality and Social Psychology, 78(3), 478–498.
- Murray, S. L., Holmes, J. G., Bellavia, G., Griffin, D. W., & Dolderman, D. (2002). Kindred spirits? The benefits of egocentrism in close relationships. Journal of Personality and Social Psychology, 82(4), 563–581.
- Murray, S. L., Rose, P., Bellavia, G., Holmes, J. G., & Kusche, A. (2002). When rejection stings: How self-esteem constrains relationship-enhancement processes. Journal of Personality and Social Psychology, 83(3), 556–573.
