= Marc Siegel =

American physician and author

Marc K. Siegel
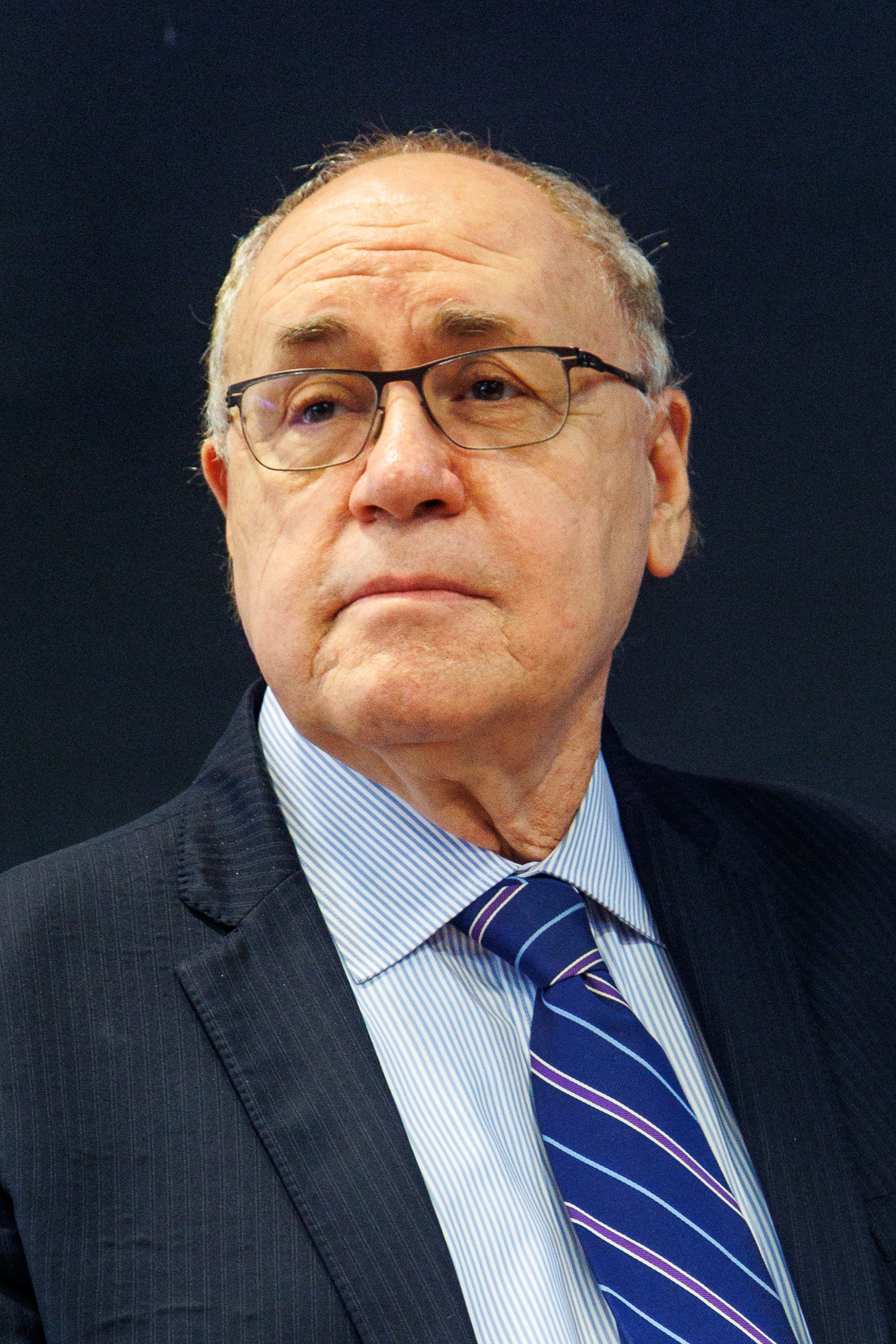
- Born: June 15, 1956 (age 70); New York, New York
- Education: Brown University; University of Buffalo (MD)
- Occupations: Physician, clinical professor
- Employer(s): NYU Langone Medical Center, Fox News
- Known for: Physician and faculty member NYU Langone Medical Center; Medical contributor Fox News Channel; Author
- Title: Doctor of Medicine
- Website: Official website

Marc K. Siegel is an American physician, clinical professor of medicine at NYU Langone Medical Center, author, and contributor to The Hill, The Wall Street Journal, Slate, Fox News, and member of the board of contributors at USA Today. He is the medical director of NYU's Doctor Radio on SiriusXM.

== Early life and education ==
Siegel attended East Meadow High School.

Following high school, he attended Brown University in Providence, Rhode Island, from 1974 to 1978.

He received his Doctor of Medicine degree in 1985 from the State University of New York at Buffalo.

He completed his residency in internal medicine in 1988 at New York University Medical Center.

== Books and media commentary ==
=== Infectious disease and public health ===
==== Swine flu, SARS, and avian influenza outbreaks ====
In his books, columns, and interviews, Siegel suggested differentiated responses to infectious disease outbreaks, such as the swine flu, SARS, and avian influenza outbreaks. As a result, he has at times praised and at times criticized public health officials and the press for what he considered fearmongering about, or excessive focus on, certain outbreaks, arguing that resources should be directed toward other health threats. He has written three books promoting this view: False Alarm: the Truth About the Epidemic of Fear (2005), Bird Flu: Everything You Need to Know About the Next Pandemic (2006), and Swine Flu: The New Pandemic (2009). Siegel promoted his book False Alarm in a September 2005 appearance on The Daily Show with Jon Stewart.

In 2001, Siegel recommended that individuals focus their health efforts based on the most likely ailments, rather than those that generate the most media. At the time, bovine spongiform encephalopathy ("mad cow disease") was generating headlines, but the average American woman faced a 1-in-3 lifetime chance of heart disease, a much higher risk. Siegel suggested focusing on everyday interventions that can produce large health impacts, rather than media-driven fears.

During the 2009 outbreak of Swine flu, Siegel was a proponent of administering Tamiflu to children at summer camps "where there have been large, confirmed outbreaks" in order to stop the spread; Siegel said that he respectfully disagreed with the CDC's guidance to limit the use of Tamiflu in camps when lives could be saved with more aggressive treatments.

==== COVID-19 pandemic ====
During the COVID-19 pandemic in the United States, Siegel frequently appeared in media where he at times questioned the changing CDC guidelines and at times supported them. In January 2020, he "urge[d] people not to travel to China"; the following month he reported from the quarantine center where infected people from the Diamond Princess were in isolation, stating that "the virus appears to be more contagious than the flu and therefore very difficult to contain" and described PPE in use. In a March 2020 appearance on Fox News's Hannity, Siegel stated that, based on the declining case count in China at the time, COVID-19 "should be compared to the flu." A study by Kathleen Hall Jamieson and Dolores Albarracín, published in the peer-reviewed Harvard Kennedy School Misinformation Review in April 2020, identified Siegel's statement as part of a broader set of COVID-19 misinformation "circulating in conservative media."

In July 2021, Siegel interviewed Dr. Fauci on SiriusXM's Doctor Radio, during which Dr. Fauci noted that masking may be required into 2022 to protect the vulnerable. In a 2022 interview with Siegel, Dr. Fauci discussed future boosters. In July 2021, Siegel urged TV viewers to get vaccinated, noting in a TV appearance that "the vaccine works extremely well even against the delta variant, preventing infection in 90 percent of cases." In August 2021, Siegel advocated for wider availability of booster shots as a means to provide enhanced protection to broader groups.

Siegel's 2020 book, COVID: The Politics of Fear and the Power of Science, juxtaposes the meaningful scientific advancements in medicine of the last decades with the role of the media and politics in stoking extreme "doom and gloom" fears. The book examines technology that, prior to the pandemic, led to the healthiest and safest period in human history, and compares that to the decision-making process early in the pandemic. The Wall Street Journal reviewed it, stating "Dr. Siegel’s chief argument is hard to dismiss: that fear, encouraged by a news media obsessed with doom and misery, has impelled public-health experts ... to impose draconian policies and ordinary Americans either to exaggerate or ignore moderately serious problems like Covid-19."

Siegel at times praised parts of each of President Donald Trump's and President Joe Biden's handling of the coronavirus pandemic.

==== 2022 monkeypox outbreak ====
During the 2022–2023 mpox outbreak, Siegel praised the U.S. CDC for making changes to public health guidance that increased the likelihood of controlling the virus. He also praised improvements in real-time data collection that allowed refinements to public health messaging, an improvement over prior diseases. He urged faster distribution of vaccines and treatments to the hardest-hit areas.

==== Other public health topics ====
Siegel also compared the sanitation and rodent control of New York City and Los Angeles during the COVID pandemic, noting that New York was improving from its early-COVID proliferation of garbage, but Los Angeles was not. He predicted that these differences would lead to a difference in public health outcomes.

Following the on-field cardiac arrest of Damar Hamlin and his subsequent recovery, Siegel compared the power of positive stories to unite the country with the divisiveness of DC politics, in particular the fight over the election of House Speaker Kevin McCarthy.

=== Affordable Care Act ===
Siegel criticized President Barack Obama over portions of his Patient Protection and Affordable Care Act (ACA) health care reform legislation because Siegel believed the legislation would result in narrower networks, increased deductibles, and reduced access to care. In 2017, Siegel wrote an op-ed in The New York Times that criticized the ACA and its essential health benefits provision (which he described as "an overstuffed prix fixe meal filled with benefits like maternity and mental health coverage") and praised the Republican legislation to repeal the ACA. During the repeal debate, Siegel supported Republican legislation that would limit "the menu of essential benefits" and instead create subsidized "high-risk pools" for uninsured patients with pre-existing conditions, although he also opposed "drastic cuts to Medicaid" supported Medicare expansion based on the success shown in Indiana and Ohio, and urged increased interstate competition for insurers.

In 2018, Siegel published an opinion piece in support of the Affordable Care Act's requirement that restaurants make calorie information available to diners, noting studies that suggest calorie labeling can reduce intake by 30-40 calories daily, which adds up to a weight change of 3 to 5 pounds per year.

=== Presidential candidate health ===
During the first Trump administration, Siegel interviewed President Trump about topics including his health, during which Trump described a cognitive evaluation as requiring him to remember "person, woman, man, camera, TV." The phrase later became a meme. The interview was praised by the Columbia Journalism Review as prompting a "six-minute meander through Trump’s thicket of self-diagnosis, during which the President mentioned China, Russia, Ukraine, judicial appointments, the Twenty-fifth Amendment, and, most notably, his ability to recite a string of five words while under observation by medical experts."

Siegel advocates for public release of presidential candidate health records. Siegel reviewed the medical records of Senator John McCain during his 2000 presidential campaign, among others. In September 2016, Siegel urged then-candidates Hillary Clinton and Donald Trump to release their health records, noting Trump's weight and diet created risks regarding his ability to serve. In Fox News appearances during the 2016 U.S. presidential campaign, he urged the release of health records of candidate Hillary Clinton, in order to evaluate her physical fitness for office.

In a USA Today opinion piece published April 2015, Siegel compared the public release of Senator John McCain's health records during his presidential campaign to Secretary Clinton's refusal to release hers. A further piece also published in April, this time in the Washington Times, repeated similar comparisons to past candidates’ disclosures.

Siegel has repeatedly ridden with President George W. Bush in his Warrior 100k annual three-day mountain bike ride, where they discussed the role of endurance exercise in healing physical wounds and behavioral challenges.

In 2018, Barbara Bush entered hospice after ceasing aggressive treatment for lung and heart disease. Siegel said her choice showed "fortitude [and] courage." Similarly, when President Carter entered hospice care in 2023, Siegel discussed the legacy left by Carter as well as the opportunity to educate the public regarding palliative care.

=== Mind-body connection and healing ===
The mind-body problem refers to the challenge of reconciling neuro-physiology and consciousness in the human mind and brain. In The Inner Pulse: Unlocking the Secret Code of Sickness and Health (2011), Siegel describes medical miracles and posits a perceptible but ineffable and immeasurable "essential life force" "where the physical and the spiritual combine," advising readers to engage in practices to strengthen and focus it for use in overcoming disease and healing. It was reviewed in Publishers Weekly as "an intriguing approach to the mind/body conundrum."

=== Host of Doctor Radio Reports on SiriusXM ===
Siegel has hosted the SiriusXM radio show Doctor Radio Reports twice a week since March 2020, focusing on the impact of the COVID-19 pandemic and the efficacy of public health efforts to neutralize it. He is the medical director of Doctor Radio.

=== Teen Pregnancy ===
Siegel appeared on Fox News and suggested the decline in teen pregnancies is a problem because it is having a negative impact on the US birth rate. He claimed “the problem is teens and young adults from ages 15 to 19, the fertility rate is down 7 percent, and it’s down 70 percent over the last two decades, meaning we’re telling people that are young not to have babies, to wait until they’re in a more stable life situation, until they’re more financially secure. Maybe they haven’t found the right partner.”

== Personal life ==
Siegel was born on June 15, 1956, in New York City. He is married to Ludmilla Luda Siegel, who is a physician and neurologist. They have three children.

Siegel is Jewish and cites the Oath of Maimonides as a medical ethics influence.
