= Fiona Fidler =

Australian professor and lecturer (b. 1974)

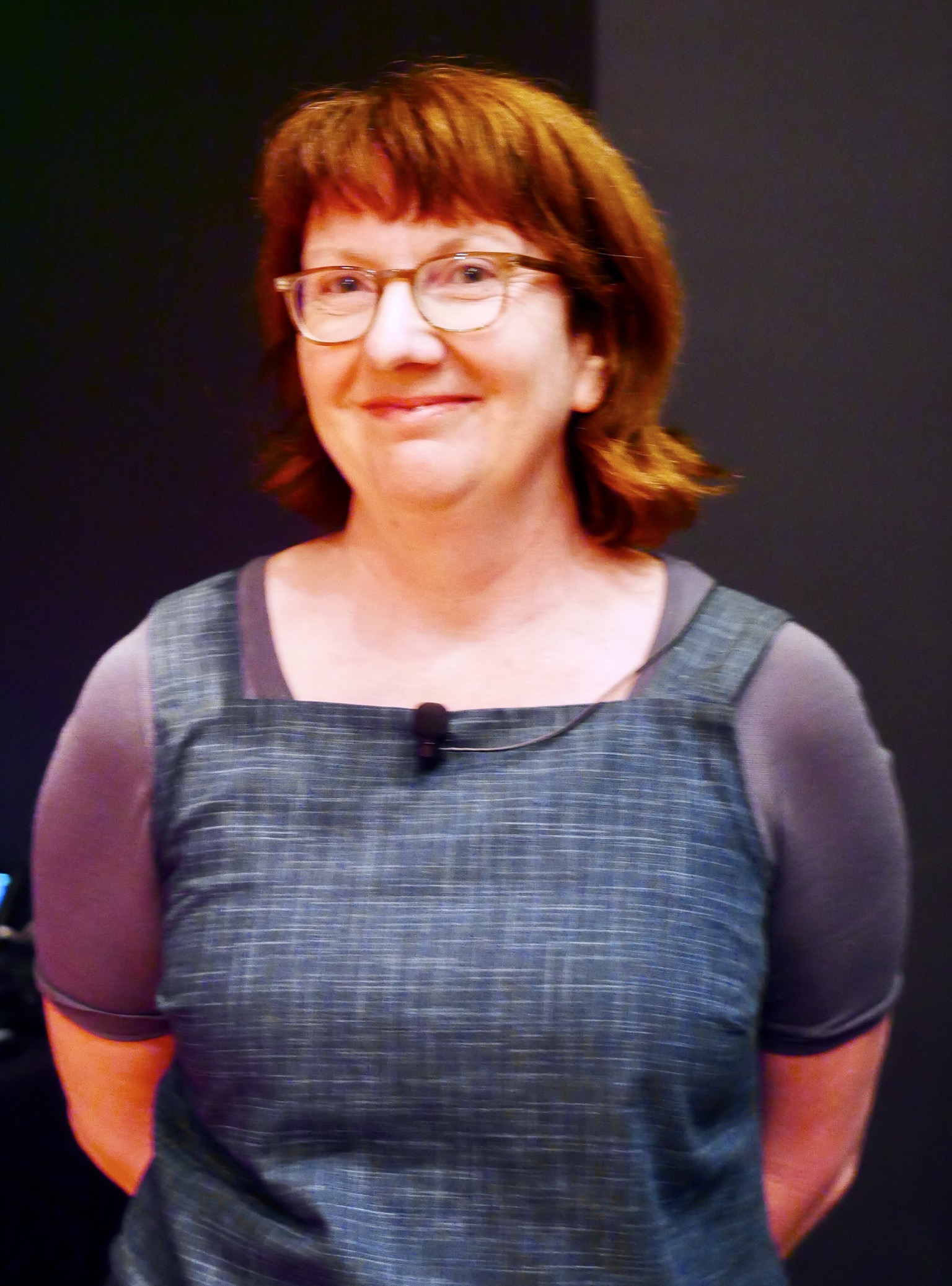
- Born: 1974 (age 51–52); Townsville, North Queensland
- Education: BPsySc(Hons) 1994; PhD History and Philosophy of Science 2005
- Occupations: Researcher into Metascience, statistical practices, reproducibility, open science, reasoning and decision making in science.

Fiona Fidler (born 1974) is an Australian professor and lecturer with interests in meta-research, reproducibility, open science, reasoning and decision making and statistical practice. She has held research positions at several universities and across disciplines in conjunction with Australian Research Council (ARC) Centres of Excellence.

== Education ==
Fidler completed a Bachelor of Psychology (Hons) with majors in Psychology and Sociology at James Cook University of North Queensland in 1994. In 2005 she completed a PhD in the Department of History and Philosophy of Science at the University of Melbourne. Her thesis topic was From Statistical Significance to Effect Estimation: Statistical Reform in Psychology, Medicine and Ecology.

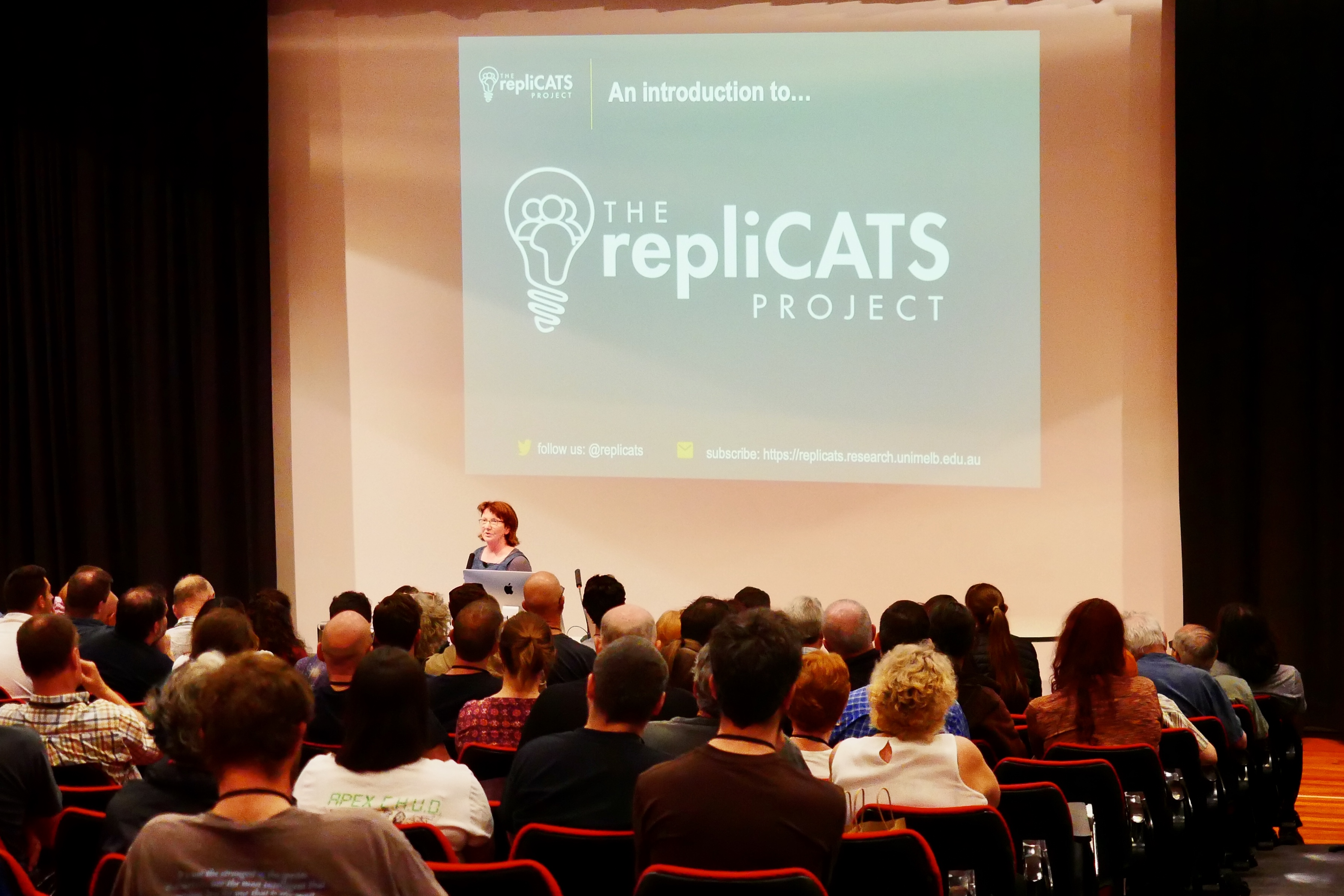
Fidler at Skepticon - Melbourne "The replication crisis in the social sciences"

== Career ==
Fidler states her main interest is in "how scientists and other experts reason, make and justify decisions, and change their minds."

She has a continuing focus on "statistical controversies, for example, the ongoing debate over Null Hypothesis Significance Testing versus Estimation (Effect Sizes, Confidence Intervals) and arguments about Frequentists versus Bayesian statistics."

Fidler has been active in promoting the credibility of research and discussion around the "reproducibility crisis". She has written or co-written a number of articles concerning scientific uncertainty.

From 2007 to 2010 Fidler was an Australian Research Council (ARC) Postdoctoral Fellow in the School of Psychological Science at La Trobe University. Then from 2011 to 2014 she was senior research fellow in the Centre of Excellence for Biosecurity Risk Assessment (CEBRA) and the ARC Centre of Excellence in Environmental Decisions (CEED) at The University of Melbourne where she worked on various expert judgement projects.

in 2015 Fidler received an ARC Future Fellowship to explore reproducibility and open science in conservation science. She took up a position at the University of Melbourne jointly in the School of BioSciences (as part of the quantitative and applied ecology group, QAEco). Fidler has continuing collaborations with the Interdisciplinary Conservation Science Research Group at RMIT University.

With Professor Simine Vazire (Simine Vazire), she co-leads the interdisciplinary [MetaMelb Research Initiative () at the University of Melbourne. This group uses scientific methodology to study science. The group studies interests in reproducibility (Replication), replicability, and transparency in several fields of science.

In 2019 MetaMelb launched the repliCATS (replicating Collaborative Assessment for Trustworthy Science) study. Using the IDEA protocol which utilises the power of group discussion, participants will make structured judgements about the credibility of 3,000 published social scientific research claims. The IDEA protocol "is a structured protocol for eliciting expert judgments based on the Delphi process. IDEA stands for Investigate, Discuss, Estimate, Aggregate." Google scholar identifies a total of 5462 citations in her career and 1025 in 2019.

Since 2022, Fidler has been the Head of the History and Philosophy of Science Program at the University of Melbourne HPS

Fidler was the founding president of the Association for Interdisciplinary Metaresearch and Open Science (AIMOS), which was established to improve the quality of scientific research.

== Personal life ==
Fidler was born in 1974 in Townsville, North Queensland. She lives in Melbourne with her two children.
