= Brent Roberts =

American psychologist

- Education: University of California, Berkeley
- Known for: Conscientiousness; Narcissism
- Awards: 1994 J. S. Tanaka Dissertation Award; 2007 Diener Award in Personality Psychology from the Society for Personality and Social Psychology
- Scientific career
- Fields: Social psychology Personality psychology
- Workplaces: University of Tulsa; University of Illinois at Urbana–Champaign
- Thesis: A Longitudinal Study of the Reciprocal Relation Between Women's Personality and Occupational Experience (1994)
- Doctoral advisor: Ravenna Helson

Brent Walter Roberts is an American social and personality psychologist who is professor of psychology at the University of Illinois at Urbana–Champaign. He is known for his research on personality traits, especially conscientiousness and narcissism. He was the president of the Association for Research in Personality, and was named an ISI Highly Cited Researcher in 2016 and 2017. In 2014 he presented the Paul B. Baltes Lecture at the Berlin-Brandenburg Academy of Sciences and Humanities.
