= Social Cognition (journal) =

- Discipline: Social psychology, cognitive psychology
- Language: English
- Edited by: Jeffrey Sherman

Publication details
- History: 1982-present
- Publisher: Guilford Press
- Frequency: Bimonthly
- Impact factor: 1.286 (2015)

Standard abbreviations
- ISO 4: Soc. Cogn.

Indexing
- ISSN: 0278-016X
- LCCN: 82645328
- OCLC no.: 07684885

Links
- Journal homepage; Online access

Social Cognition is a bimonthly peer-reviewed academic journal covering social and cognitive psychology. It was established in 1982 and is published by Guilford Press. It is the official journal of the International Social Cognition Network. The editor-in-chief is Keith Maddox, (Tufts University). According to the Journal Citation Reports, the journal has a 2015 impact factor of 1.286.
