= Frank Forelli =

American mathematician

Frank John Forelli, Jr.
- Born: 8 April 1932; San Diego, California, U.S.
- Died: 5 September 1994 (aged 62); Madison, Wisconsin, U.S.
- Education: University of California, Berkeley
- Known for: Contributions to holomorphic function theory and functional analysis
- Scientific career
- Fields: Mathematics (Functional analysis, Complex analysis)
- Workplaces: University of Wisconsin–Madison
- Thesis: Marcel Riesz's theorem on conjugate functions (1961)
- Doctoral advisor: Henry Helson

Frank John Forelli, Jr. (8 April 1932, San Diego – 5 September 1994, Madison, Wisconsin) was an American mathematician, specializing in the functional analysis of holomorphic functions.

Forelli received his bachelor's degree from the University of California, Berkeley and then, after 3 years as an officer in the U. S. Navy, returned to Berkeley. He received there in 1961 his Ph.D. under Henry Helson with thesis Marcel Riesz's theorem on conjugate functions. In 1961 Forelli joined the faculty of the University of Wisconsin–Madison, where he remained for the remainder of his life.

The main focus of his research was in the properties of holomorphic functions. In particular, he used Hilbert space methods applied to the boundary values of such functions. His contributions to the field were recognized early in his career by an invitation to give an invited lecture at the International Congress of Mathematicians in Nice in 1970.

Upon his death, he was survived by his wife and two daughters.

== Selected publications ==
- Forelli, Frank (1963). "The Marcel Riesz theorem on conjugate functions". Trans. Amer. Math. Soc. 106 (3): 369–390. doi:10.1090/s0002-9947-1963-0147827-3. MR 0147827.
- Forelli, Frank (1963). "Invariant subspaces in L^{1}". Proc. Amer. Math. Soc. 14: 76–79. doi:10.1090/s0002-9939-1963-0144196-5. MR 0144196.
- Forelli, Frank (1963). "Analytic measures". Pacific J. Math. 13 (2): 571–578. doi:10.2140/pjm.1963.13.571. MR 0157193.
- Forelli, Frank (1967). "Analytic and quasi-invariant measures". Acta Math. 118: 33–59. doi:10.1007/bf02392475. MR 0209771.
- Forelli, Frank (1975). "Uniqueness of representing measures". Proc. Amer. Math. Soc. 47 (2): 431. doi:10.2307/2039760. JSTOR 2039760. MR 0355474.
- Forelli, Frank (1977). "A necessary condition on the extreme points of a class of holomorphic functions". Pacific J. Math. 73 (1): 81–86. doi:10.2140/pjm.1977.73.81. MR 0466630.
- Forelli, Frank (1981). "A necessary condition on the extreme points of a class of holomorphic functions. II". Pacific J. Math. 92 (1): 277–281. doi:10.2140/pjm.1981.92.277. MR 0618065.
- Forelli, Frank (1982). "A note on ideals in the disc algebra". Proc. Amer. Math. Soc. 84 (3): 389–392. doi:10.1090/s0002-9939-1982-0640238-0. MR 0640238.
- Forelli, Frank (1985). "Uniqueness of representing measures". Proc. Amer. Math. Soc. 93 (3): 507–508. doi:10.1090/s0002-9939-1985-0774013-6. MR 0774013.
