= International Social Cognition Network =

- Abbreviation: ISCON
- Formation: 2003
- Type: INGO
- Region served: Worldwide
- Official language: English
- Website: ISCON Official website

The International Social Cognition Network (ISCON) was formed in 2003 as a joint enterprise between the European Social Cognition Network (ESCON) and the Person Memory Interest Group (PMIG) to act as an umbrella society to advance the international study of social cognition. Among the objectives of ISCON are to advance the understanding of social cognition by encouraging research and the preparation of papers and reports, holding meetings for the presentation of scientific papers, sponsoring or issuing publications containing scientific papers and other relevant material, establishing professional honors and awards to recognize excellence in social cognition research, and cooperating with other scientific and professional societies.

== Official journal ==
The official journal of ISCON is Social Cognition, published bimonthly by Guilford Press.

== Conferences ==
ISCON sponsors the Social Cognition Preconference that precedes the annual conference of the Society for Personality and Social Psychology. It organizes a similar preconference for the tri-annual meeting of the European Association of Social Psychology. ISCON also is a sponsor of the annual conference of the Person Memory Interest Group that precedes the annual conference of the Society of Experimental Social Psychology.

== Awards ==
In cooperation with the Personal Memory Interest Group, ISCON honors career contributions to the study of social cognition with the Thomas M. Ostrom Award. Contributions of junior scientists are honored annually with the Early Career Award. Each year, ISCON also gives an award for the Best Social Cognition Paper and recognizes outstanding research by graduate students with the Best Poster Award.
