= Sylvie Graf =

Czech psychologist (born 1981)

- Born: Sylvie Kouřilová; 21 April 1981 (age 45); Brno, Czechoslovakia
- Education: Masaryk University
- Occupation: Professor of Social Psychology
- Employer(s): University of Bern, Switzerland
- Awards: Neuron Award for promising scientists in the field of social sciences (2015), Forbes magazine's Top Czech Female Scientists (2023)
- Website: www.sylvie-graf.eu

Sylvie Graf (née Kouřilová; born 21 April 1981) is a Czech social psychologist. She is the winner of the 2023 Neuron Award for promising scientists in the field of social sciences. She focuses on how to improve relationships between social groups – through intergroup contact, mass media exposure, and careful use of language describing people in intergroup context.

== Professional career ==
Graf currently works both as a senior leading researcher at the University of Bern in Switzerland, and a leading senior researcher at the Institute of Psychology, Academy of Sciences of the Czech Republic. At the institute, she founded and is leading the Brno Lab of Intergroup Processes.

In 2015, Academia publishing house released the book Češi a jejich sousedé (The Czechs and Their Neighbors), which she co-authored with Martina Hřebíčková.

In 2022, Czech Television broadcast her lecture Reducing Prejudice as a Path to a Functioning Society from the series "Czech Academy of Sciences – Top Research in the Public Interest."

=== Awards ===
- Prémie Otto Wichterleho in 2015 awarded by the Czech Academy of Sciences.
- Winner of the 2023 Neuron Award for promising scientists in the field of social sciences.
- Forbes magazine's Top Czech Female Scientists 2023.
