= Fourier algebra =

Algebras arising in harmonic analysis

Fourier and related algebras occur naturally in the harmonic analysis of locally compact groups. They play an important role in the duality theories of these groups. The Fourier–Stieltjes algebra and the Fourier–Stieltjes transform on the Fourier algebra of a locally compact group were introduced by Pierre Eymard in 1964.

== Definition ==
=== Informal ===
Let $G$ be a locally compact abelian group, and $\hat{G}$ the dual group of $G$. Then $L_1(\hat{\mathit{G}})$ is the space of all functions on $\hat{G}$ which are integrable with respect to the Haar measure on $\hat{G}$, and it has a Banach algebra structure where the product of two functions is convolution. We define $A(G)$ to be the set of Fourier transforms of functions in $L_1(\hat{\mathit{G}})$, and it is a closed sub-algebra of $CB(G)$, the space of bounded continuous complex-valued functions on $G$ with pointwise multiplication. We call $A(G)$ the Fourier algebra of $G$.

Similarly, we write $M(\hat{\mathit{G}})$ for the measure algebra on $\hat{G}$, meaning the convolution algebra of all finite regular Borel measures on $\hat{G}$. We define $B(G)$ to be the set of Fourier-Stieltjes transforms of measures in $M(\hat{\mathit{G}})$. It is a closed sub-algebra of $CB(G)$, the space of bounded continuous complex-valued functions on $G$ with pointwise multiplication. We call $B(G)$ the Fourier-Stieltjes algebra of $G$. Equivalently, $B(G)$ can be defined as the linear span of the set $P(G)$ of continuous positive-definite functions on $G$.

Since $L_1(\hat{\mathit{G}})$ is naturally included in $M(\hat{\mathit{G}})$, and since the Fourier-Stieltjes transform of an $L_1(\hat{\mathit{G}})$ function is just the Fourier transform of that function, we have that $A(G) \subset B(G)$. In fact, $A(G)$ is a closed ideal in $B(G)$.

=== Formal ===
While non-abelian groups don't have dual groups, we may still define the Fourier algebras for any locally compact group in terms of unitary representations. Let $G$ be a locally compact group. For any unitary representation $\pi$ of $G$ on a Hilbert space $H_\pi$, and any $\xi,\eta\in H_\pi$, we denote by $\pi_{\xi,\eta}$ the complex-valued function on $G$ defined by $\pi_{\xi,\eta}(g)=\langle \pi(g)\xi,\eta\rangle$. The Fourier-Stieltjes algebra $B(G)$ is then defined as the algebra of all complex functions on $G$ that arise as matrix coefficients $\pi_{\xi,\eta}$ for some unitary representation $\pi$ of $G$ and some $\xi,\eta\in H_\pi$. $B(G)$ forms an algebra with pointwise addition and multiplication, as for any unitary representations $\pi$ and $\rho$ of $G$, $\pi_{\xi_1,\eta_1}+\rho_{\xi_2,\eta_2}=(\pi\oplus\rho)_{\xi_1\oplus\xi_2,\eta_1\oplus\eta_2}$ and $\pi_{\xi_1,\eta_1}\rho_{\xi_2,\eta_2}=(\pi\otimes\rho)_{\xi_1\otimes\xi_2,\eta_1\otimes\eta_2}$. We define the norm in $B(G)$ to be given by $\| u\|=\text{inf} \{ \| \xi\| \|\eta\| : u(g)=\langle\pi(g)\xi,\eta\rangle \text{ for some representation } \pi \}$. This norm makes $B(G)$ a Banach algebra. We define the Fourier algebra $A(G)$ to be the closed subalgebra spanned by the matrix coefficients of the left regular representation of $G$ on $L^2(G)$.

=== Abelian case ===
Let $B(\mathit{G})$ be a Fourier–Stieltjes algebra and $A(\mathit{G})$ be a Fourier algebra such that the locally compact group $\mathit{G}$ is abelian. Let $M(\widehat{\mathit{G}})$ be the measure algebra of finite measures on $\widehat{G}$ and let $L_1(\widehat{\mathit{G}})$ be the convolution algebra of integrable functions on $\widehat{G}$, where $\widehat{\mathit{G}}$ is the character group of the Abelian group $\mathit{G}$.

The Fourier–Stieltjes transform of a finite measure $\mu$ on $\widehat{\mathit{G}}$ is the function $\widehat{\mu}$ on $\mathit{G}$ defined by

$$\widehat{\mu}(x) =  \int_{\widehat{G}} \overline{X(x)} \, d \mu(X), \quad x \in G$$

The space $B(\mathit{G})$ of these functions is an algebra under pointwise multiplication is isomorphic to the measure algebra $M(\widehat{\mathit{G}})$. Restricted to $L_1(\widehat{\mathit{G}})$, viewed as a subspace of $M(\widehat{\mathit{G}})$, the Fourier–Stieltjes transform is the Fourier transform on $L_1(\widehat{\mathit{G}})$ and its image is, by definition, the Fourier algebra $A(\mathit{G})$. The generalized Bochner theorem states that a measurable function on $\mathit{G}$ is equal, almost everywhere, to the Fourier–Stieltjes transform of a non-negative finite measure on $\widehat{G}$ if and only if it is positive definite. Thus, $B(\mathit{G})$ can be defined as the linear span of the set of continuous positive-definite functions on $\mathit{G}$. This definition is still valid when $\mathit{G}$ is not Abelian.

== Results ==
=== Helson–Kahane–Katznelson–Rudin theorem ===
Let $A(G)$ be the Fourier algebra of a compact group $G$. Building upon the work of Wiener, Lévy, Gelfand, and Beurling, in 1959 Helson, Kahane, Katznelson, and Rudin proved that, when $G$ is compact and abelian, a function f defined on a closed convex subset of the plane operates in $A(G)$ if and only if $f$ is real analytic. In 1969 Dunkl proved the result holds when $G$ is compact and contains an infinite abelian subgroup.

=== Relationship to group operator algebras ===
If $G$ is a locally compact group, we may define the associated group algebras $C^*(G)$ to be the enveloping C*-algebra of $L^1(G)$ and the von Neumann algebra $VN(G)$ associated to the left regular representation $\lambda$ of $G$ on $L^2(G)$. Then $B(G)$ is the Banach space dual of $C^*(G)$ and $VN(G)$ is the dual of $A(G)$. The pairing between $A(G)$ and $VN(G)$ is defined by, for $T\in VN(G)$ and $u\in A(G)$ defined $u(x)=\langle \lambda (x)\xi ,\eta\rangle$, by $\langle T,u\rangle=\langle T\xi,\eta\rangle$.

In the case where $G$ is abelian, we have $A(G)\cong L^1(\hat{G})$ and $VN(G)\cong L^\infty(\hat{G})$, so this reduces to the fact that $L^\infty(\hat{G})$ is the dual of $L^1(\hat{G})$. Likewise, we have $C^*(G)\cong C_0(\hat{G})$ (the algebra of continuous functions on $\hat{G}$ vanishing at infinity) and $B(G)\cong M(\hat{G})$, so that $B(G)$ is the dual of $C^*(G)$ reduces to the fact that $M(\hat{G})$ is the dual of $C_0(\hat{G})$.
