= Wiebke Bleidorn =

Psychologist

Wiebke Bleidorn is a personality psychologist. She is a professor at the University of Zurich. in the department of psychology. She is president of Association for Research in Personality (ARP) until 2023. She received the American Psychological Association's Award for Distinguished Scientific Early Career Contributions to Psychology in 2019.
