= Social Psychological and Personality Science =

- Discipline: Social psychology
- Language: English
- Edited by: Margo Monteith

Publication details
- History: 2010-present
- Publisher: SAGE Publications
- Frequency: 8/year
- Impact factor: 3.605 (2018)

Standard abbreviations
- ISO 4: Soc. Psychol. Pers. Sci.

Indexing
- ISSN: 1948-5506 (print); 1948-5514 (web)
- LCCN: 2009202706
- OCLC no.: 320771445

Links
- Journal homepage; Online access; Online archive

Social Psychological and Personality Science is a peer-reviewed academic journal that covers research in social and personality psychology. Its editor-in-chief is Margo Monteith (Purdue University). It was established in 2010 and is published by SAGE Publications. The journal is jointly owned by four different societies: the Association for Research in Personality, European Association of Social Psychology, Society of Experimental Social Psychology, and Society for Personality and Social Psychology.

== Abstracting and indexing ==
The journal is abstracted and indexed in PsycINFO and Scopus. According to the Journal Citation Reports, its 2018 impact factor is 3.605, ranking it 6 out of 63 journals in the category "Psychology, Social".
