= Julie Norem =

Psychologist

Julie K. Norem is a personality psychologist. She is the Margaret Hamm Professor of Psychology at Wellesley College. She has been teaching at Wellesley College since 1992. In 2006, she was president of the Association for Research in Personality. Norem's research focuses on the strategies people use to pursue their goals, particularly defensive pessimism, and how self-knowledge influences adaptation, performance, and social relationships. Norem received her A.B. in Behavioral Sciences from the University of Chicago and her Ph.D. in psychology from the University of Michigan. She has written numerous book chapters and articles, and her book "The Positive Power of Negative Thinking" has gained significant attention.
