= Association for Research in Personality =

- Abbreviation: ARP
- Predecessor: Society for Personality and Social Psychology
- Formation: 2001
- Type: 501(c)(3) non-profit organization
- Purpose: Research
- President: Wiebke Bleidorn
- Past President: Rich Lucas
- Executive Officer: M. Brent Donnellan
- Website: personality-arp.org

The Association for Research in Personality (ARP) is an American learned society dedicated to advancing research into personality. Its mission statement does not mention specific disciplines such as social psychology or policy research, instead simply emphasizing the scientific study of personality. It was established in 2001, with David Watson as the founding president. It originally held an annual preconference before the Society for Personality and Social Psychology's annual conference. In 2009, the ARP began holding its own annual conference.

== Presidents ==
The current president of the ARP is Wiebke Bleidorn a professor of psychology at the University of Zurich. Past presidents of the ARP, in reverse chronological order, are as follows:

- Rich Lucas (2020–2021)
- Brent Roberts (2018–2019)
- Dan McAdams (2016–17)
- Dan Ozer (2014–15)
- Will Fleeson (2012–13)
- David Funder (2010–11)
- Bill Revelle (2008–09)
- Julie Norem (2006–07)
- Lew Goldberg (2004–05)
- Paul Costa Jr (2003)
- Walter Mischel (2002)
- David Watson (2001)
