= Michael F. Steger =

American psychologist

Michael F. Steger is an American psychologist and academic. He is known for his research in the field of positive psychology. He has authored academic publications and books, including Designing Positive Psychology: Taking Stock and Moving Forward and Purpose and Meaning in the Workplace. He is also the founder and director of the Center for Meaning and Purpose and is Professor of Psychology at Colorado State University.

== Early life and education ==
Steger grew up in southwestern Minnesota and attended Macalester College, where he earned his BA in Psychology. He continued his education at the University of Oregon, obtaining an MS in Counseling Psychology, and later completed his PhD in Counseling and Personality Psychology at the University of Minnesota in 2005, where his PhD advisor was Shigehiro Oishi. His dissertation, focused on the development of the Meaning in Life Questionnaire, earned him the Best Dissertation Award from the International Society for Quality-of-Life Studies.

== Career ==
He holds honorary appointments as a faculty member at the University of Melbourne, the Stockholm School of Economics, and North-West University in South Africa. He is a fellow of the American Psychological Association, and has served on the Board of Directors of the International Positive Psychology Association.

He developed the widely used psychological measure, the Meaning in Life Questionnaire (cited 4260 times, according to Google Scholar) and the Work and Meaning Inventory. (Cited 1333 times, according to Google Scholar. In 2011, Steger co-edited Designing Positive Psychology: Taking Stock and Moving Forward, which evaluates the first decade of positive psychology research. He later co-edited Purpose and Meaning in the Workplace, which explores how organizations can foster meaningful work environments to enhance both employee satisfaction and productivity.

== Selected publications ==
- Designing Positive Psychology: Taking Stock and Moving Forward. Series in Positive Psychology. Oxford, New York: Oxford University Press. 2011-01-31. ISBN 978-0-19-537358-5.
- Steger, Michael F. (2013). Purpose and meaning in the workplace (First ed.). Washington, D.C: American Psychological Association. ISBN 978-1433813146.
- Steger, Michael F.; Russo Netzer, Pninit (June 5, 2022). Meaning 360: Meaning Through the Seasons A Guided Reflection. p. 84. ISBN 979-8836968144.
