= Udai Bhan Tewari =

Indian mathematician

- Born: 18 June 1944 (age 82); Ambedkar Nagar, Uttar Pradesh, India
- Died: Kanpur
- Citizenship: Indian
- Education: Lucknow University; University of California, Berkeley
- Awards: Shanti Swaroop Bhatnagar Award(1986)
- Scientific career
- Fields: Harmonic Analysis
- Workplaces: IITK
- Doctoral advisor: Henry Berge Helson

Udai Bhan Tewari (born 18 June 1944) was an Indian mathematician, Emeritus Professor at IITK. His research work included contribution in the field of group algebra and measure algebra of locally compact group. He was awarded the Shanti Swaroop Bhatnagar Award for his contribution to mathematics.
