= Ravenna Helson =

American psychologist (1925–2020)

- Born: Ravenna Mathews; February 13, 1925; Austin, Texas
- Died: 2020
- Education: University of Texas at Austin; University of California, Berkeley
- Known for: Creativity; Psychology of women
- Spouse: Henry Helson (m. 1954–2010)
- Children: 3
- Awards: 2017 Society for Personality and Social Psychology Annual Convention Legacy honoree
- Scientific career
- Fields: Psychology
- Workplaces: Institute of Personality Assessment and Research; University of California, Berkeley
- Thesis: Recall of Items as a Function of the Number of Categories Into which They Have Been Classified (1952)
- Doctoral advisors: Leo Postman; Warner Brown
- Notable students: Brent Roberts

Ravenna Mathews Helson (February 13, 1925–2020) was an American psychologist known for her research on the psychology of women and creativity. Dacher Keltner has described her as "a pioneer in the study of women's lives".

== Career ==
Helson completed her PhD in psychology at the University of California, Berkeley (UC Berkeley) in 1952. She joined the faculty of psychology at Smith College, but moved with her husband, mathematician Henry Helson, back to California in 1955 when he was offered a faculty position at UC Berkeley. Helson began working at the Institute of Personality Assessment and Research (IPAR) in 1957, when she accepted an invitation from director Donald W. MacKinnon to join the institute. She was promoted to the position of full-status researcher at IPAR in 1980, and became an adjunct professor of psychology at UC Berkeley the same year.

Helson was a key figure in organizing and conducting the Mills Longitudinal Study, a long-term study of personality development over the lifespan. The study involved more than 100 Mills College senior undergraduates (born 1937–1939), who were recruited in 1958–1959, and continues to the present day. The main purpose of the study was to examine personality in relation to creativity in women. Over the years, the study expanded to address varied topics including changes in personality over the lifespan and in relation to women's work lives, marital satisfaction after child rearing, and the impact of culture on individualism.

Helson is an adjunct professor emeritus of psychology at UC Berkeley.

== Personal life ==
Helson was born in Austin, Texas to E. J. Mathews, Registrar and Dean of Admissions at the University of Texas and Ravenna Wakefield Mathews. She graduated summa cum laude from the University of Texas and briefly worked as a newspaper reporter in Corpus Christi, Texas before returning to school to study psychology.

Helson married Henry Helson in 1954. The couple had three children and remained married until Henry's death in 2010. She died in 2020.

== Representative works ==
- Helson, R. (1971). Women mathematicians and the creative personality. Journal of Consulting and Clinical Psychology, 36(2), 210–220.
- Helson, R. (1996). In search of the creative personality. Creativity Research Journal, 9(4), 295–306.
- Helson, R., George, L., & John, O.P. (2009). Challenge episodes over middle age: A person-centered study of aging well in poor health. Journal of Research in Personality, 43, 323–334.
- Helson, R., Jones, C., & Kwan, V. S. (2002). Personality change over 40 years of adulthood: Hierarchical linear modeling analyses of two longitudinal samples. Journal of Personality and Social Psychology, 83(3), 752–766.
- Helson, R., & Moane, G. (1987). Personality change in women from college to midlife. Journal of Personality and Social Psychology, 53(1), 176–186.
- Helson, R., & Wink, P. (1992). Personality change in women from the early 40s to the early 50s. Psychology and Aging, 7(1), 46–55.
