= Daniel Ozer =

Psychologist

Daniel Ozer is a personality psychologist. He is a professor at the University of California, Riverside. He was president of Association for Research in Personality (ARP) from 2014 thru 2015. He has made significant contributions to understanding individual differences in personality and their impact on social behavior, and has received numerous awards for his work, such as the APA Distinguished Scientific Award for an Early Career Contribution to Psychology, as well as service to the profession.
