= Richard Lucas (psychologist) =

American psychologist

Richard E. Lucas is an American psychologist specializing in personality psychology. Lucas is an MSU Foundation Professor in the Department of Psychology at Michigan State University. He earned his Ph.D. from the University of Illinois. He was president of the Association for Research in Personality (ARP) from 2020 to 2021. He was awarded the ARP service award in 2019. Lucas is the editor of the Personality Processes and Individual Differences section of Journal of Personality and Social Psychology.
