= William Fleeson =

American personality psychologist

William Fleeson is an American personality psychologist. He is the Hultquist Family Professor of Psychology at Wake Forest University. He earned his Ph.D. in psychology from the University of Michigan in 1992, after completing a Bachelor of Arts in philosophy in 1987 at the University of Wisconsin–Madison. He was president of Association for Research in Personality (ARP) in 2012. He was awarded the Society for Personality and Social Psychology (SPSP) Theoretical Innovation Prize in 2002 and the SPSP Carol and Ed Diener Award in Personality Psychology in 2016.
