= M. Brent Donnellan =

M. Brent Donnellan (born June 19, 1972) is a professor of psychology at Michigan State University. He is known for research on social psychology and personality psychology.

== Biography ==
M. Brent Donnellan was born June 19, 1972, in Springfield, Ohio. Donnellan completed his undergraduate career at the University of California, Davis in 1994, receiving his bachelor's degree in psychology. In 2001, he received his Ph.D. in human development from Davis.

He joined the faculty of the Department of Psychology at MSU in 2003. Donnellan received tenure and a promotion from MSU in 2009. In June of 2023, Donnellan was appointed as dean of the College of Social Sciences. He previously taught at Texas A&M University, where he served as Associate Department Head from January 2016 to August 2017. Donnellan has a long-standing affiliation with the Family Transitions Project, which follows participants as they make the transition from adolescence to adulthood. He is the author or co-author of 130 journal articles (out or in press), one edited book, 21 book chapters and one book under contract.

== Research ==
Donnellan's research has encompassed various areas, including personality trait development, self-esteem development, personality and romantic relationships, and various methodological issues. His primary focus of research typically focuses on the development of personality throughout the lifespan as well as how characteristics vary from environment to environment.

One aspect of the adolescence-adulthood transition that Donnellan has primarily focused on is self-esteem. He researched the pros and cons of high and low global self-esteem, which reflects a person's overall evaluation of personal value and adequacy in relation to their ideal perception of who they are as a person. Individuals with high self-esteem benefit from having well-rounded coping mechanisms and display behaviors that facilitate productive achievement, such as occupational success and academic achievement. They are typically able to avoid mental and physical health problems, substance abuse and antisocial behavior. They are also more likely to have healthy social relationships, persevere during difficult situations, have a positive sense of personal well-being, and receive positive opinions by peers. On the other side of the spectrum, individuals with low self-esteem suffer from poorer mental and physical health, including depressive symptoms and health problems; experience worse economic prospects, occasionally illustrate antisocial behavior and tend to exhibit higher levels of criminal behavior during adolescence.

The research that Donnellan and his colleagues have done points to various macro factors in determining the correlation between low self-esteem and externalizing problems in a negative aspect. One suggestion is that low self-esteem weakens ties to society, thus decreasing conformity to social norms and increasing delinquency. Another suggestion is that a lack of unconditional positive self-regard, and/or low self-regard is linked with psychological problems, which includes aggression. They have also taken a micro focus point of view in determining the relationship between low self-esteem and delinquent behavior. One point of view was to study the developmental processes involving person-environment transactions. It could be that an environmental or social influence forced the individual to act in certain ways, and it's the environment that needs to be changed to have an eventual positive effect on the individual. Subsequently, there is also a parental support component that researchers have briefly looked at as a starting point for future instances of low self-esteem.
