= Martina Hřebíčková =

Czech psychologist

- Born: 1963 (age 61–62); Opava, Czechoslovakia
- Education: Masaryk University in Brno (BA, MA), Bielefeld University (MA), Charles University in Prague (PhD), Academy of Sciences (Doctor of Science)
- Alma mater: Masaryk University, Bielefeld University, Charles University
- Employer: Czech National Academy of Sciences

Martina Hřebíčková (born 1963) is a Czech psychologist, focusing primarily on research in personality psychology and social psychology. She is one of the most cited Czech psychologists and according to Forbes, she is one of the most productive social scientists in the country.

== Life and work ==
Martina Hřebíčková was born in 1963 in Opava. She is responsible for the Czech translation and psychometric validation of the Big Five Inventory measuring five basic personality dimensions, one of the most important psychological tests used today.

In her work, she examines individual differences in personality traits and has also conducted lexical analysis of words describing personality. She works at the Institute of Psychology of the Czech Academy of Sciences and is currently part of the Brno Laboratory of Intergroup Processes team, which focuses on ways to improve relations between different social groups. She is particularly interested in whether prejudice and discrimination affect people's mental well-being, not only those who are the targets of such prejudice and discrimination, but also those who hold and spread these prejudices, for example in the online environment.
