= Henry Helson =

American mathematician

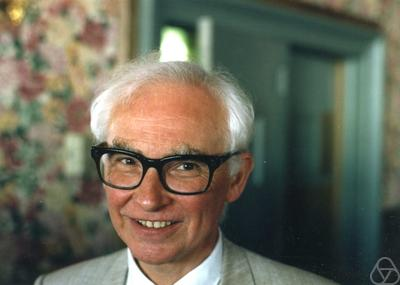
Henry Helson

Henry Berge Helson (June 2, 1927 – January 10, 2010) was an American mathematician at the University of California at Berkeley who worked on analysis.

== Education and career ==
Helson received his bachelor's degree from Harvard University in 1947. With the support of a Harvard travelling fellowship, he spent the academic year 1947–1948 in Europe; he visited London, Paris, Prague, and Vienna, but spent most of his time in Warsaw and then from spring 1948 in Wroclaw, where he worked with Marczewski. Helson received his Ph.D. in 1950 from Harvard with supervisor Lynn Loomis and then spent the academic year 1950–1951 primarily in Uppsala working with Beurling but with frequent trips elsewhere in Europe. He became in 1951 an instructor and then an assistant professor at Yale University. He became in 1955 an assistant professor, in 1958 an associate professor, and in 1961 a full professor at the University of California, Berkeley, retiring there as professor emeritus in 1993. In 1970 he was an Invited Speaker at the ICM in Nice.

== Helson sets ==
If G is an infinite, nondiscrete, locally compact group, then a Helson set is defined to be a compact set P in G such that every continuous function on P can be extended to a function in the Fourier algebra A(G) in the group G. Helson was the first to prove that there exist perfect Helson sets for the case of the group consisting of the real line.

== Legacy ==
Helson founded the mathematics-specialty publishing company Berkeley Books. Upon his death he was survived by his wife Ravenna Helson, a renowned personality psychologist, their daughter, two sons, and three grandchildren. His doctoral students include Frank Forelli and Udai Bhan Tewari.

== Selected works ==
- Helson, H. (March 1954). "Proof of a conjecture of Steinhaus". Proc Natl Acad Sci U S A. 40 (3): 205–208. Bibcode:1954PNAS...40..205H. doi:10.1073/pnas.40.3.205. PMC 527972. PMID 16589456.
- Helson, Henry (1958). "Conjugate series and a theorem of Paley". Pacific J. Math. 8 (3): 437–446. doi:10.2140/pjm.1958.8.437. MR 0098952.
- with David Lowdenslager: "Prediction theory and Fourier series of several complex variables". Acta Math. 99: 165–202. 1958. doi:10.1007/bf02392425. MR 0097688.
- Helson, Henry (1959). "Conjugate series in several variables". Pacific J. Math. 9 (2): 513–523. doi:10.2140/pjm.1959.9.513. MR 0107777.
- with David Lowdenslager: "Prediction theory and Fourier series of several complex variables. II". Acta Math. 106: 175–213. 1961. doi:10.1007/bf02545786. MR 0176287.
- Lectures on invariant subspaces. New York: Academic Press. 1964.
- Harmonic Analysis. Reading, Mass.: Addison-Wesley. 1983; rev. 2nd edn, 1995, publ. Hindustan Book Agency and Helson Publishing Co.
- with Farhad Zabihi: Helson, Henry; Zabihi, Farhad (2007). "A geometric problem in function theory". Illinois J. Math. 51 (3): 1027–1034. doi:10.1215/ijm/1258131116. MR 2379736.
