= Personality judgment =

Perception people have of each other's personalities

Personality judgment (or personality judgement in UK) is the process by which people perceive each other's personalities through acquisition of certain information about others, or meeting others in person. The purpose of studying personality judgment is to understand past behavior exhibited by individuals and predict future behavior. Theories concerning personality judgment focus on the accuracy of personality judgments and the effects of personality judgments on various aspects of social interactions. Determining how people judge personality is important because personality judgments often influence individuals' behaviors.

== Accuracy ==
=== Perspectives on accuracy ===
Research on the accuracy of personality judgments varies based on three major perspectives on the basis of accurate personality judgment. These perspectives vary based on the criteria used to determine accuracy.

- Pragmatism: The pragmatic perspective on accuracy suggests that people will only perceive aspects of personality that they can use when interacting with others. The personality judgments are deemed accurate when they are useful in future interactions.
- Constructivism: The constructivist perspective on accuracy suggests that there is no objective, accurate measure of personality judgment. People may make differing personality judgments of the same person based on their unique perspectives of the judged person. According to constructivists, each judgment is equally correct. Thus, rather than focusing on accuracy of judgments, these researchers focus on the different methods and perspectives through which people make personality judgments.
- Realism: The realistic perspective on personality judgment assumes that there is an objective reality in personality that can be measured empirically. Realists believe that personality judgments may be verified for accuracy by determining whether the judgments predict the target individual's behaviors. Accuracy may also be verified by agreement of personality judgments among several independent judges.

=== Contributors to accurate personality judgment ===
A variety of variables contribute to the accuracy or inaccuracy of personality judgment in systematic ways. These variables include characteristics of the individual whose personality is being judged, as well as characteristics of the individual who is judging personality.

==== Judge characteristics ====
Characteristics of the individual judging personality that contribute to accuracy include the following:

- Gender and ethnic similarity to target
  - A person is more likely to make an accurate personality judgment when the individual they are judging has the same gender and ethnicity as the judge.
- Stereotype knowledge and utilization,
  - When judges are only aware of the target's group membership, judges are likely to base personality judgments on their knowledge of stereotypes concerning the relevant group. However, these effects are much stronger for gender stereotypes than ethnic stereotypes, such that even when abundant information about the target is available, judges will base personality judgment on gender stereotypes but not ethnic stereotypes.
- Relationship to the target individual
  - Judges who are acquainted with the target individual typically provide more accurate personality judgments, presumably due to their knowledge of the individual across different types of situations.
- Number of judges
  - Although one judge may provide an accurate personality judgment, the average of multiple judgments from different individuals more strongly predicts behavior than judgments from one individual.
- Sex of the judge
  - Females typically provide more accurate personality judgments than males.

==== Target characteristics ====
Characteristics of the target individual that are important for accurate personality judgment include the following:

- Visibility of the trait in question
  - Traits that are more readily observable are more likely to elicit accurate judgments. Extraversion is typically considered a more visible trait, whereas neuroticism is considered a less visible trait.
- Psychological adjustment of the target individual
  - Individuals who are well-adjusted are more likely to elicit accurate personality judgments. Well-adjusted individuals reveal more about their personality to those they interact with, thus making it easier for others to judge them accurately.
- Amount of personal disclosure
  - Targets of personality judgment who reveal personal information about themselves facilitate ease of accurate personality judgment for the traits of agreeableness, openness to experience, and extraversion. Additionally, individuals who disclose personal values to others may facilitate the ease of accurate judgment of neuroticism.
- Expressions of emotion
  - Individuals who display facial expressions corresponding to negative emotions such as fear and sadness are judged as being more neurotic and less extraverted and agreeable. Individuals who display facial expressions corresponding to positive emotions are typically judged as being more extraverted and agreeable.
- Facial expressions corresponding to personality traits
  - Individuals are able to accurately judge many traits on the basis of viewing photographs of the faces of people who exemplify specific traits. Individuals are especially accurate at judging personality when viewing a photograph that consists of a composite of faces that display the same trait.

== Effects on behavior ==
Personality judgment not only influences perceptions of individuals, but it also may influence the behavior of individuals being judged. This phenomenon is known as behavioral confirmation, and occurs when one's preconceived ideas about a person influence the behavior of that person. For example, if an individual is believed to be aggressive, one's behavior toward that individual may elicit an aggressive response, even if the individual is not typically aggressive. Behavioral confirmation may occur in a variety of settings, including classrooms and social interactions. Researchers have shown that when a male individual believes he is talking to an attractive woman over the phone, the woman will act more sociable and agreeable than if the male believes he is talking to an unattractive woman. This suggests that the woman's behavior in this situation is being influenced by the male's expectations concerning her appearance, rather than her actual personality characteristics.

== Cultural influences ==
An additional determinant of the processes through which personality is judged and the accuracy of these judgments is culture. Typically, researchers report cross-cultural consistency in the judgment of personality. However, people from different types of cultures tend to find certain traits more easily identifiable than others, based on judging personality from facial characteristics of targets alone. For example, people from Western cultures are typically better able to identify the traits of extroversion and aggression than are individuals from Eastern cultures.
