= Journal of Personality and Social Psychology =

- Discipline: Personality psychology, social psychology
- Language: English
- Edited by: Sandra L. Murray, Dolores Albarracín, Richard E. Lucas

Publication details
- History: 1965–present
- Publisher: American Psychological Association (United States)
- Frequency: Monthly
- Impact factor: 6.7 (2024)

Standard abbreviations
- ISO 4: J. Pers. Soc. Psychol.

Indexing
- CODEN: JPSPB2
- ISSN: 0022-3514
- LCCN: 65009855
- OCLC no.: 1783133

Links
- Journal homepage; Online access

The Journal of Personality and Social Psychology is a monthly peer-reviewed academic journal published by the American Psychological Association that was established in 1965. It covers the fields of social and personality psychology. The editors-in-chief are Sandra L. Murray (University at Buffalo), Dolores Albarracín (University of Pennsylvania), and Richard E. Lucas (Michigan State University).

== Contents ==
The journal's focus is on empirical research reports; however, specialized theoretical, methodological, and review papers are also published. For example, the journal's most highly cited paper, cited over 90,000 times, is a statistical methods paper discussing mediation and moderation.

Articles typically involve a lengthy introduction and literature review, followed by several related studies that explore different aspects of a theory or test multiple competing hypotheses. Some researchers see the multiple-experiments requirement as an excessive burden that delays the publication of valuable work, but this requirement also helps maintain the impression that research that is published in JPSP has been thoroughly vetted and is less likely to be the result of a type I error or an unexplored confound.

The journal is divided into three independently edited sections. Attitudes and Social Cognition addresses those domains of social behavior in which cognition plays a major role, including the interface of cognition with overt behavior, affect, and motivation. Interpersonal Relations and Group Processes focuses on psychological and structural features of interaction in dyads and groups. Personality Processes and Individual Differences publishes research on all aspects of personality psychology. It includes studies of individual differences and basic processes in behavior, emotions, coping, health, motivation, and other phenomena that reflect personality.

The journal has implemented the Transparency and Openness Promotion (TOP) Guidelines. The TOP Guidelines provide structure to research planning and reporting and aim to make research more transparent, accessible, and reproducible.

== Abstracting and indexing ==
The journal is abstracted and indexed in:

- Academic ASAP
- Academic OneFile
- Academic Search Premier
- AgeLine
- Bibliography of Asian Studies
- Current Contents
- Current Index to Statistics
- Dietrich's Index Philosophicus
- FRANCIS
- Family Index
- Family Studies Abstracts
- Higher Education Abstracts
- InfoTrac
- International Bibliography of the Social Sciences
- MLA International Bibliography
- MEDLINE/PubMed
- Peace Research Abstracts Journal
- ProQuest
- PsycINFO
- Race Relations Abstracts
- Religion Index One
- Russian Academy of Sciences Bibliographies
- Scopus
- Social Sciences Citation Index
- Social Services Abstracts
- Social Work Abstracts
- SocINDEX
- Sociological Abstracts

According to the Journal Citation Reports, the journal has a 2024 impact factor of 6.7.

== Controversies ==
JPSP is one of the journals analyzed in the Open Science Collaboration's Reproducibility Project after JPSP's publication of questionable research for mental time travel (Bem, 2011) (see: replication crisis; "Feeling the Future" controversy).

The journal refused to publish refuting replications performed by Ritchie's team, in relation to an earlier article they published in 2010 that suggested that psychic abilities may have been involved (backward causality).
