= Dolores Albarracín =

Professor of psychology and business

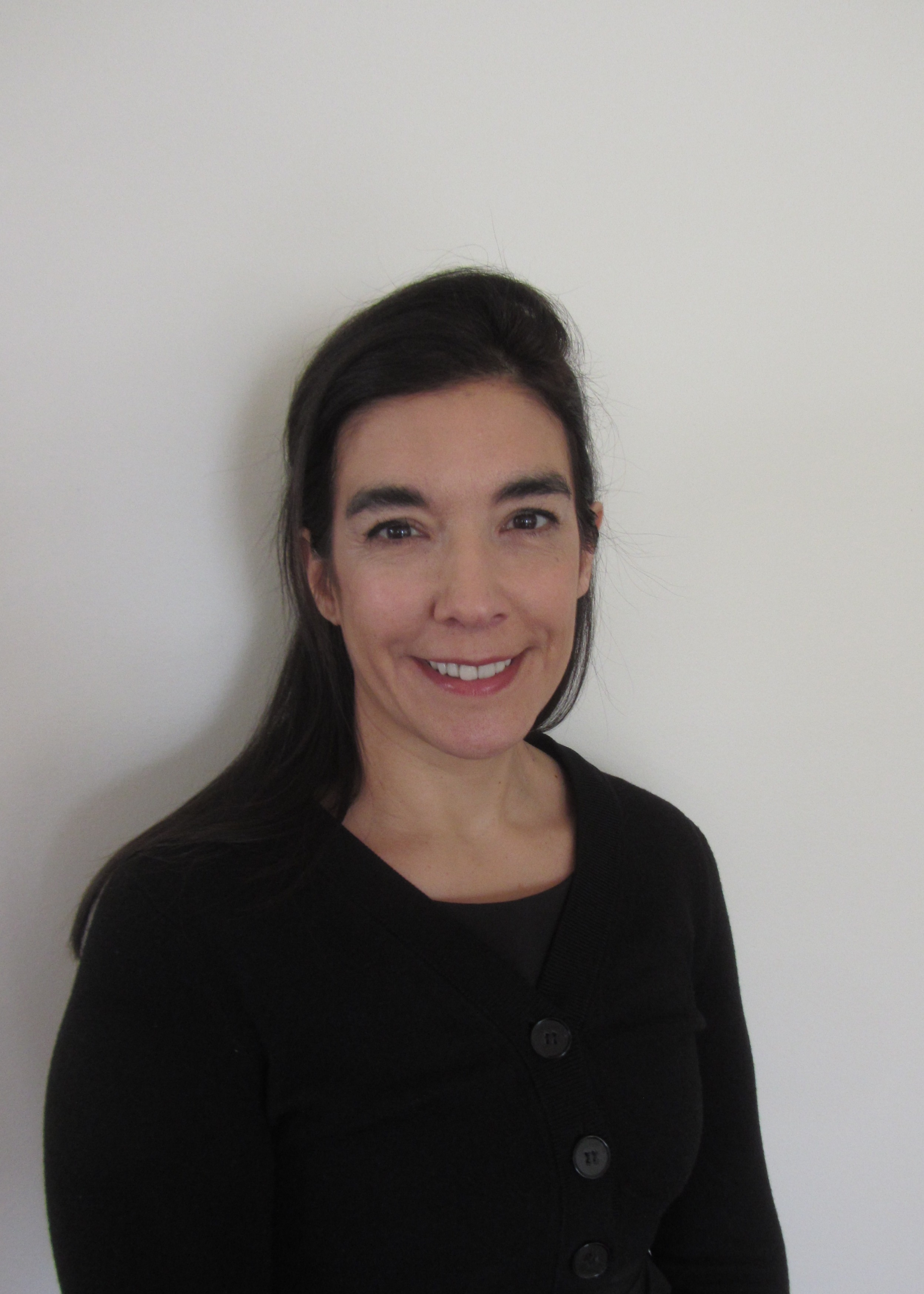
- Born: La Plata, Buenos Aires, Argentina
- Education: Catholic University of La Plata; National University of La Plata; University of Belgrano; University of Illinois at Urbana Champaign

Dolores Albarracín is a psychologist, author and professor based in Pennsylvania. She is a Penn Integrates Knowledge University Professor at the University of Pennsylvania, coappointed in the Department of Psychology in the School of Arts and Sciences and the Annenberg School for Communication. She is known for her work in the fields of behavior, communication, and persuasion. Her contributions have had implications for the scientific understanding of basic social psychological processes and communication policy, especially in the area of health.

She was the Dave Thomas Professor of Psychology at the University of Florida and Professor of Psychology at the University of Illinois. She is the author/editor of several books, Action and Inaction in a Social World, Creating Conspiracy Beliefs, Prediction and Change of Health Behavior: Applying the Theory of Reasoned Action Approach, The Handbook of Attitudes. She is the lead or co-author of more than 200 published articles and book chapters. She directs the Social Action Lab at the University of Pennsylvania.

For 2024 she was awarded the BBVA Foundation Frontiers of Knowledge Award in the category "Social Sciences".

== Early life and education ==
Albarracín was born in La Plata, Buenos Aires, Argentina, in a family of politically active academics. She grew up during the long military dictatorship that ruled Argentina for close to a decade. After attending Liceo Victor Mercante in La Plata, she received a degree in Psychology from Catholic University of La Plata and a degree in Letters from the National University of La Plata. Subsequently, she completed her Ph.D. in Clinical Psychology from the University of Belgrano.

Albarracín was recruited by social psychologist Martin Fishbein to attend the University of Illinois at Urbana Champaign, where she received her Ph.D. under the direction of Robert S. Wyer and Martin Fishbein.

== Career ==
After completing her Ph.D. in 1997, Albarracín joined the University of Florida as Assistant Professor and ascended through the ranks to Dave Thomas Professor of Psychology there until 2007, when she started teaching at the University of Illinois. In 2021, she joined the University of Pennsylvania.

She is the author/editor of two books, Prediction and Change of Health Behavior: Applying the Theory of Reasoned Action Approach and The Handbook of Attitudes. She is the lead or co-author of more than 150 published articles and book chapters, and has received two Scientist Development Awards from the National Institute of Mental Health. She was awarded the Diener Award in Social Psychology and the Mid-Career Award for Outstanding Scientific Contributions from the Attitudes and Social Influence Group of the Society for Personality and Social Psychology. In 2022, she was elected the American Academy of Political and Social Science's Harold Lasswell Fellow.

Albarracín directs the Social Action Lab at the University of Pennsylvania. She is a fellow of the Society for Experimental Social Psychology, the American Psychological Association and Association for Psychological Science. She is also a Professor of Psychology at the University of Illinois at Urbana-Champaign. She was the editor in chief of Psychological Bulletin from 2014-2020. She was elected a Fellow of the American Academy of Arts and Sciences in 2024.

== Research ==
Albarracín's research focuses on attitudes and persuasion, the relationship between intention and behavior, and predicting general activity patterns. In the beginning of her career, she did research on the sequence of cognitive and motivational events that mediate the impact of persuasive communication on attitudes and behavior. Later, her work was aimed at understanding how people form specific attitudes and goals based on fragmentary social information and thoughts. More recently, she has studied how behavioral intentions undermine actual action, methods of debunking misinformation and conspiracy theories, and the dynamics of multiple-behavior change.

Much of Albarracín's research has had implications in the area of health including how health risk behaviors can be discouraged and how peer influence impacts the likelihood of smoking. For almost two decades, she has received funding from National Institute of Health to apply the theoretical findings of her research to curb disease in the area of HIV, smoking, and lifestyle change.

=== Behavior, attitudes, affects and persuasion ===
Albarracín has done significant research about how behavior and attitudes are influenced by selective exposure, source credibility, intentions and affective feelings. In the early 2000s she researched the effect of cognitive and motivational mediators in the impact of persuasive speech on behavior and attitudes. Her research concluded that when people have time to think about a persuasive message, they form beliefs about the behavior outcomes described. These beliefs later impact their attitude and behavior. On the other hand people base their attitudes and behavior on the affective feeling they are experiencing at the time, if they don't have enough time to think about the message content. Her research was the first that detailed the cognitive processes that act as a mediator in the relationship between persuasive messages and behavior. Another line of her research studied how affect impacts the cognitive responses to a persuasive message.

She has also studied the influence of self-talk in the regulation of behavior. Her research provided a socio-cognitive understanding on the conditions and effects of this form of speech. Her research showed that people talk to themselves using the pronoun I, but sometimes, they also address themselves in the second person pronoun, you. According to her research, when people require conscious self-guidance, people refer to themselves as you. Moreover, she concluded that the second-person mode of self-talk contribute to effective self-regulation.

In the late 1990s she investigated how intention facilitates actual behavior in multiple studies. In 2013, she further delved into the topic by researching how intentions can sometimes undermine actual behavior. The research found that for brief, easily enacted and regularly repeated actions, intentions can sometimes be misremembered as completed actions.

=== General action and inaction goal ===
More recently her work has been focused on action and inaction goals. The research found that people primed with action words engage in more behaviors than people primed with inaction words. Her team has also found a positivity bias favoring action over inaction. When there are no specifications about the quality and nature of actions and inaction, people find actions as more favorable than inaction. The research has important implications for mental health.

=== Applications to health promotion ===
Albarracín's research has had many implications in the health industry. In one of her researches, she examined the effectiveness of HIV-prevention campaigns in changing attitudes and behaviors. The findings revealed that persuasive messages communicated in such campaigns increase the audience's knowledge about the HIV. However, they bring about no change in the actual behavior of individuals. According to the research, active and complex programs that strengthen behavioral skills are effective.

Albarracín has also investigated the efficacy of health program campaigns that use fear appeals to discourage certain behaviors. Her research has highlighted a positive effect of fear on intentions and behavior, especially if the message encourages self-efficacy. Her research also highlights that the direction of behavioral recommendations also matters in how effective a health program will be. According to her research multi-behavior interventions where the recommendation direction is homogeneous are more effective. So a program requiring an action and an inaction will be less effective than a program requiring two actions or two inactions.

== Bibliography ==
=== Books ===
- The Handbook of Attitudes (2005) ISBN 978-0805844931
- Prediction and Change of Health Behavior: Applying the Theory of Reasoned Action Approach (2007) ISBN 978-0805859263

=== Selected journal articles ===
- The Influence of Peer Behavior as a Function of Social and Cultural Closeness: A Meta-Analysis of Normative Influence on Adolescent Smoking Initiation and Continuation (2017)
- From Primed Concepts to Action: A Meta-Analysis of the Behavioral Effects of Incidentally Presented Words (2015)
- Appealing to Fear: A Meta-Analysis of Fear Appeal Effectiveness and Theories (2015)
- Attitudes without objects: evidence for a dispositional attitude, its measurement, and its consequences. (2013)
- Splitting of the Mind: When the You I Talk to is Me and Needs Commands. (2012)
- The Time for Doing Is Not the Time for Change: Effects of General Action and Inaction Goals on Attitude Retrieval and Attitude Change (2011)
- Feeling Validated Versus Being Correct: A Meta-Analysis of Selective Exposure to Information (2009)
- The Effects of Chronic Achievement Motivation and Achievement Primes on the Activation of Achievement and Fun Goals (2009)
- Who Participates in Which Health Promotion Programs? A Meta-Analysis of Motivations Underlying Enrollment and Retention in HIV-Prevention Interventions (2007)
