= Personality and Social Psychology Review =

- Discipline: Personality psychology
- Language: English
- Edited by: Heejung Kim, David Sherman

Publication details
- History: 1997-present
- Publisher: Sage Publishing
- Frequency: Quarterly
- Impact factor: 16.161 (2021)

Standard abbreviations
- ISO 4: Pers. Soc. Psychol. Rev.

Indexing
- ISSN: 1088-8683 (print); 1532-7957 (web)
- LCCN: 97660026
- OCLC no.: 909177606

Links
- Journal homepage; Online access; Online archive

Personality and Social Psychology Review is a quarterly peer-reviewed academic journal published by the Society for Personality and Social Psychology. It publishes review and meta-analytic articles on subjects like social cognition, attitudes, group processes, social influence, intergroup relations, self and identity, nonverbal communication, and social psychological aspects of affect and emotion, and of language and discourse. The current editors-in-chief are Heejung Kim and David Sherman (University of California, Santa Barbara). The journal is a member of the Committee on Publication Ethics. It was previously published by Lawrence Erlbaum Associates, and is now published by Sage Publishing.

== Abstracting and indexing ==
The journal is abstracted and indexed in the Social Sciences Citation Index. According to the Journal Citation Reports, its 2021 impact factor is 9.281.
