= Society of Experimental Social Psychology =

Academic organization

The Society of Experimental Social Psychology (SESP) is a scientific organization of social scientists founded in 1965 with the goal of advancing and communicating theories in social psychology. Its first chairperson was Edwin P. Hollander. To expand the knowledge of social psychology, Edwin P. Hollander and his colleague Edgar Vinacke wrote 35 other social psychologists in the interest of a research-oriented social and personal psychology society. This focus was to develop a smaller group of research-oriented scientists with similar interests within the field of social psychology. The society meets annually for discussions that vary in topic. These topics usually include its membership, content of the society, and research interests among its members. To become a member, one must be a social psychologist, show evidence of contribution to social psychology, receive a nomination, and complete an application. SESP publishes the Journal of Experimental Social Psychology and Social Psychological and Personality Science.

== History ==
SESP was founded in 1965 by Edwin P. Hollander and his colleague Edgar Vinacke. Psychological societies of the time such as the American Psychological Association, were very large. They encompassed many different fields of psychology. Hollander thought it would be beneficial to form a smaller group of social scientists, focused primarily on experimental research. Since the psychological societies of the time were so vast, this would allow a smaller organization that could have more intimate dialogue on the subject matter, and also give the organization more flexibility. Hollander and Vinacke wrote 35 other prominent social psychologists of the time. Those that shown interest in the endeavor were invited to a meeting to discuss the structure of forming the SESP. The meeting took place in Chicago on May 1, 1965. William McGuire, Albert Pepitone, Marvin Shaw, Ezra Stotland, Fred Strodtbcck, W. Edgar Vinacke, and Edwin P. Hollander were in attendance. Some early members that are well-known social psychologists include; Solomon Asch, Leon Festinger, Harold Kelley, and Stanley Schachter.

== Membership ==
=== Members and criteria ===
Members of SESP come from all over the world and include over 700 social psychologists. Membership is by nomination only and is typically exclusive. A person must meet various criteria to become a member of SESP. Since SESP focuses on advancing research about social psychology, nominees prove that they have had significant input to social psychology. Nominees present that they have published on the topic of social psychology in notable journals. All nominees are social psychologists and hold a Ph.D. Once a member, there is an annual conference to attend, and a subscription to the society's publications Journal of Experimental Social Psychology and Social Psychological and Personality Science are given. Members also pay a low annual fee.

== Activities ==
The activities done by the Society of Experimental Social Psychology involve numerous things. The annual conference is a big event that all active and associate members attend. The annual conference changes location each year, with venues located all over the world. The main conference and pre-conferences do not cost extra money to attend. The topics of the conference vary depending on the theme of the convention that year. The pre-conferences are small, side presentations that are usually one hour long. These pre-conferences discuss new social psychological theories and findings. At the annual conference, SESP members talk about the purpose of the society. They discuss things like the problems involved in social psychology, how they can stay loyal to its original founders, and how to further new theories and the practice of social psychology. The annual conference also focuses on encouraging new research, tests original work, and holds panels and discussions for certain original works that are presented. Along with this annual conference, SESP also collects and evaluates statistics, conducts investigations, sponsors fund raising events, creates promotional activities, and promotes the society in a positive way.

=== Contributions ===
SESP has two publications. They are the Journal of Experimental Social Psychology and Social Psychological and Personality Science. The Journal of Experimental Social Psychology is released twice a month and contains research and theories on human social behavior. It is the official journal of SESP and is one of the field's top journals. This publication helps fund the annual conference. In 2009 they announced the publication of a new journal, Social Psychological and Personality Science. This journal is filled with short reports of single and multiple studies done by members. It is modeled after journals like Science and Psychological Science. The Social Psychological and Personality Science is a quarterly journal that not only SESP contributes to, but also the Association of Research in Personality, the European Association of Social Psychology and other co-sponsors. SESP also gives out awards to those members that have produced memorable and notable work. These awards are: The Distinguished Scientist Award, The Scientific Impact Award, The Career Trajectory Award and the Dissertation Award.

== See also ==
- Journal of Experimental Social Psychology
- Social Psychological and Personality Science
