= Society for Personality and Social Psychology =

Academic society based in Washington, D.C.

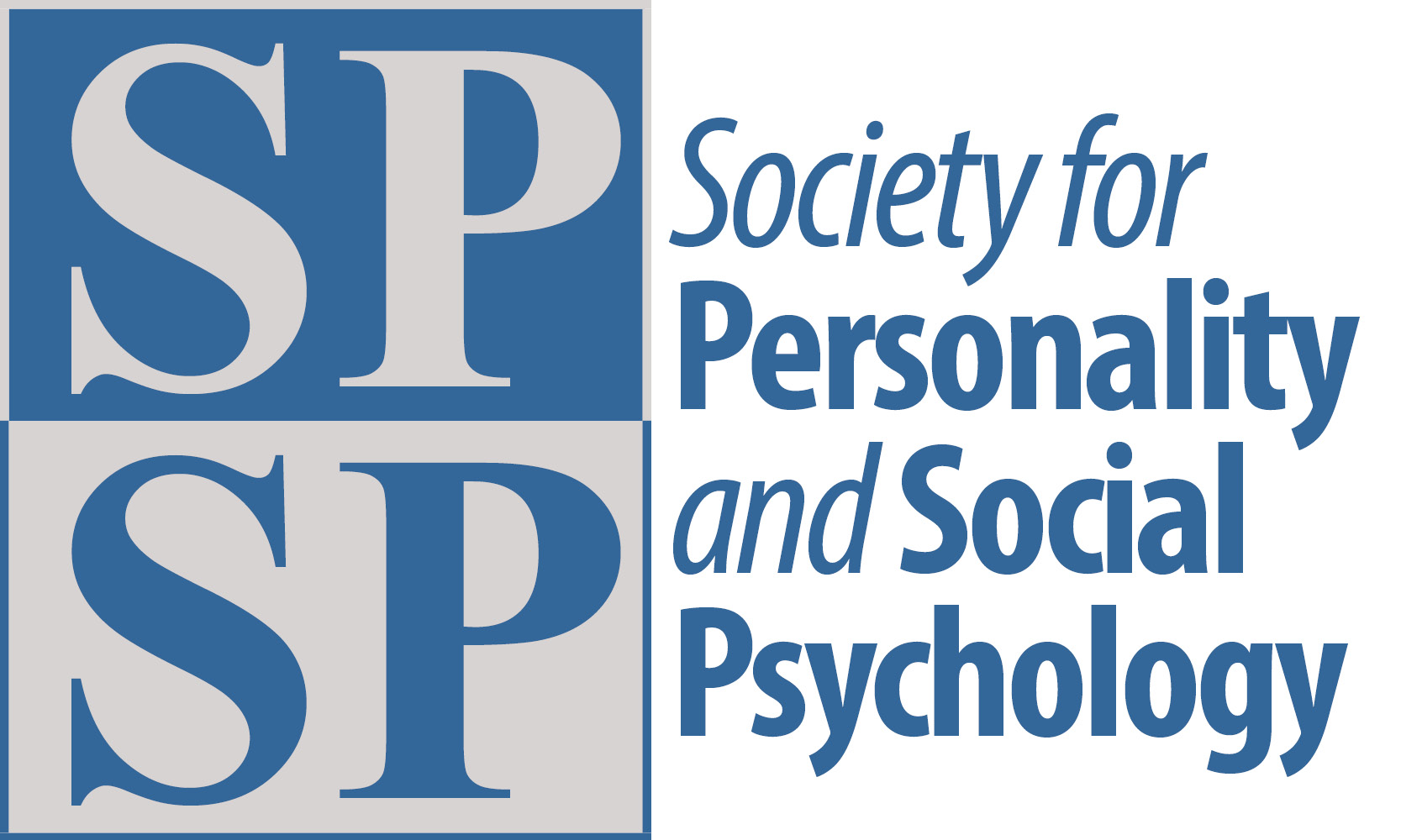
- Founded: 1974
- Headquarters: Washington, D.C.
- Members: Over 7,500
- Executive Director: Rachel Puffer
- Website: www.spsp.org

The Society for Personality and Social Psychology (SPSP) is an academic society for personality and social psychologists focused on promoting scientific research that explores how people think, behave and interact. It is the largest organization of social psychologists and personality psychologists in the world. SPSP was founded in 1974 and it manages the activities of Division 8 of the American Psychological Association.

SPSP has launched a dynamic new Community Platform for its over 6,500 members. This platform is designed to be a central, modern hub for collaboration, networking and professional growth.

== Convention ==
Each year, SPSP hosts a convention that attracts thousands of attendees. Attendees include students and new and seasoned psychologists. At the convention symposia, research is shared and members are able to engage in professional development.

== Leadership ==
SPSP governance consists of a twelve-member Board of Directors, with four officers. Governing members and committee members/leaders can be viewed at About SPSP | SPSP.

== Publications ==
SPSP publishes the journals:

- Personality and Social Psychology Bulletin (PSPB) – monthly journal consistently ranked among the most prestigious journals in social and personality psychology, according to the Social Science Citation Index
- Personality and Social Psychology Review (PSPR) – top‐ranked journal in social and personality psychology, published quarterly and devoted to theoretical and review articles
- Social Psychological and Personality Science (SPPS) – a new, brief reports electronic journal jointly published by the Society of Experimental Social Psychology, the Association for Research in Personality, the European Association of Social Psychology, the Society for Personality and Social Psychology, and other co‐sponsoring organizations
