= Distancing (psychology) =

Distancing is a concept arising from the work of developmental psychologists Heinz Werner and Bernard Kaplan. Distancing describes the process by which psychologists help a person establish their own individuality through understanding their separateness from everything around them. This understanding of one's identity is considered an essential phase in coming to terms with symbols, which in turn forms the foundation for full cognition and language. Recently, work has been done in psychological distancing in terms of development, personality and behavior.

== Language development ==
Distancing in the context of language development is the increase in “qualitative” dissimilarity between the referenced object (known as the "referent") and the way by which it is referenced (vehicle). For example, an apple would be the referent and the way in which this object is communicated either through sounds or words would be the vehicle of representation. All young children initially imitate any sounds they hear and then begin to use some of these sounds to express their needs. As they designate a sound to a need there is a “shift in function” from imitation to depicted imitation, indicating the shift from a random sound to a sound associated with a need. As a result of depicted imitation, a slight distance occurs between the sounds uttered and the event they represent. This is known as naturalistic onomatopoeic depiction.

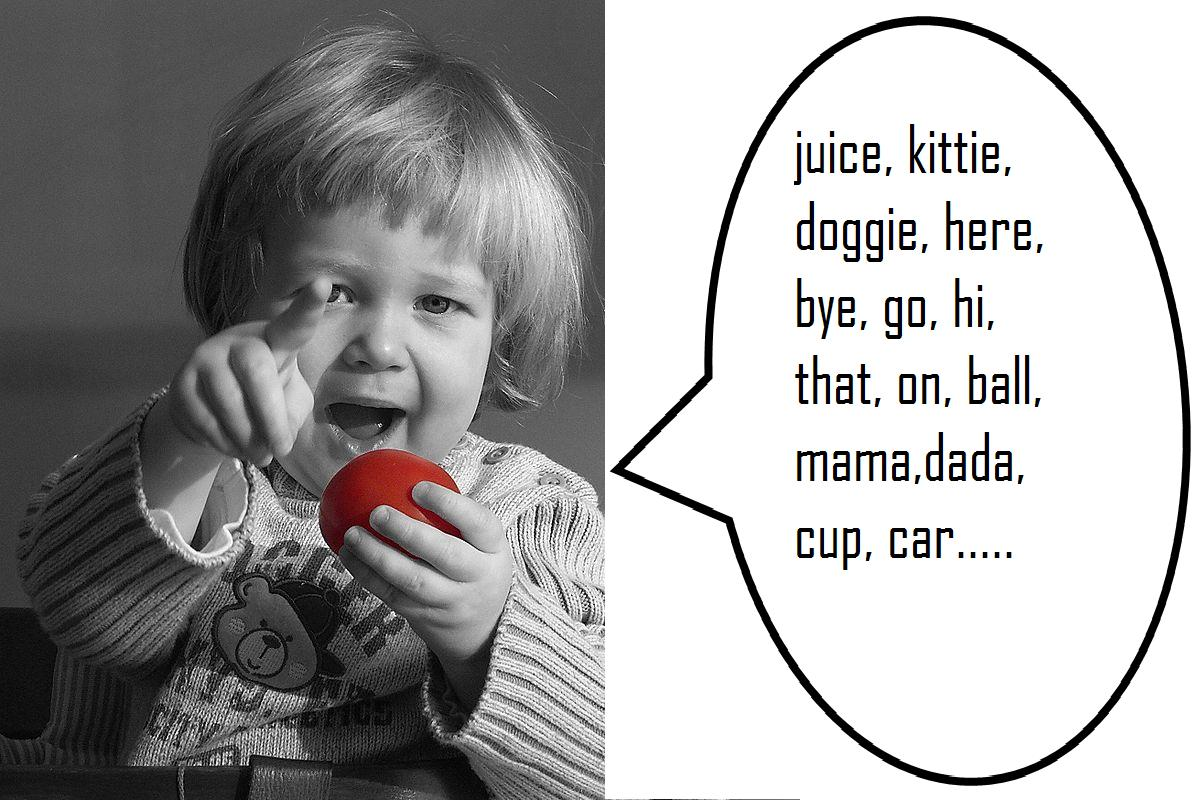
Representation of an 18-month old's vocabulary

As the distance between the referent and vehicle grows, children transition from speaking a “baby” language to standard language. This transition occurs in two directions, in distancing the referent from the vehicle and the vehicle from the referent. As the distance between the referent and vehicle grows there is a decrease in concreteness between the referent and the vehicle. For example, a sound that has come to represent a particular cat would then be applied to all cats.

The increased distance in the vehicle from the referent occurs in four types of transitional forms of linguistic representations. In the first type, children use their own onomatopoeic expressions but in conventional ways. For example, forming the verb “bumer” (= to fall) from the original word bum (boom). The second type is when children modify their words to form composite forms, like using the infantile word poch for hammering and forming the word pochmaker to mean workman. In the third type, children use a combination of their own words and conventional words like bah-sheep. The fourth type is when children are asked to repeat standard words and they respond with their own equivalent word. Children transition into normal speech when the words they use become symbols instead of signals. For example, Helen Keller was often told what the word w-a-t-e-r represented by her teacher Miss Sullivan. It was not until she placed her hand under the spout that she was able to understand what the word water meant.

The development of dialogue allows children to understand the difference between their thoughts and another's. The psychological distance is the difference in these thoughts. In turn, psychological distancing allows for greater psychological complexity such as allowing for the representation of motivation, multiple meanings, invention, intention, deceit, and lying.

== Treatment ==
Werner and Kaplan's work was later expanded by the pioneer in deaf-blind patient therapy, Dr. Van Dijk, and later refined by the work of Dr. Susan Bruce. Primarily of use in working with deaf-blind patients, distancing gradually leads the subject through a course of physical interactions which encourage the patients to respond. At first, responses may be simple repetitions of pleasurable acts, but eventually events that take place in the present tense are replaced in the subject's mind with more complicated concepts, such as desires, requests, or other expressions which reflect symbolic cognition and understanding of past events. As the subject progresses through these stages, he is eventually able to move from communicating his desires simply (as in early childhood) to a more complicated treatment of symbols in communication. Once the communication barrier is removed, more conventional therapies and educational methodologies are then possible.

== The breakdown of distancing ==
Kaplan and Wiley also use psychological distancing to describe dreaming and schizophrenia states. During dreaming, the distance between an individual to others, words, and objects they are referring to decreases. With decreasing distance between words and what they are referring to, the words begin to carry the object of reference. As a result, polysemy is riddled throughout dream speech as individuals merge imagery and gestures together. For example, the phrase “commando-red” reported during a dream means she sang (commando) at dawn (red). Schizophrenia is an extreme shrinkage of psychological distance because the waking individual is no longer able to discern the difference between themselves and others, referential object and symbolic vehicle. The decrease in distance between the schizophrenia patient and the object of reference causes these individuals to believe that the objects are an extension of themselves reflecting the person's emotions.

== Self-distancing perspective ==
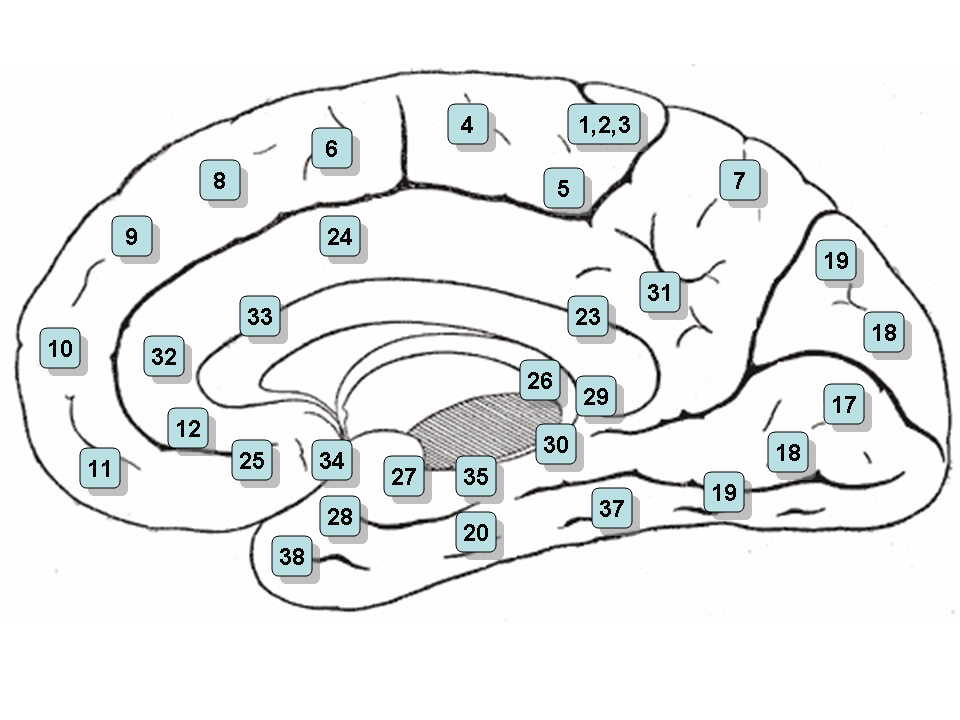
Brodmann Areas

Self-distancing occurs when an individual views their experience as an observer. In contrast to self-distancing, self-immersed individuals recall events in first-person. Current research has shown that self-immersed individuals experience increased activity in emotional, autobiographical memory recall, and self-reflecting neural networks in the brain such as the medial prefrontal cortex, and brodmann area 10 (BA10). Additionally self-immersed individuals have increased activity in subgenual anterior cingulate cortex and brodmann area 25 (BA25). Overactivation of the BA25 has been linked to depression. A self-distanced perspective can be adopted spontaneously and has been shown to negatively correlate with emotional reactivity. Individuals adopting a self-distanced perspective were also shown to be able to reconstrue and derive meaning from negative events as opposed to simply recalling the play-by-play details of what occurred in the memory. So far, this effect has been demonstrated among the Americans and Russians. Viewing events from a self-distanced perspective has the potential to allow people to work through their experiences and provide insight as well as closure to traumatic events. Moreover, it has been shown to promote wise reasoning about interpersonal and political conflicts, attenuating polarized attitudes toward outgroup members, and fostering intellectual humility, open-mindedness, and empathy over time.

Rumination is when a person continues to focus on the causes and consequences of their stress. Studies have indicated that rumination delays the amount of time it takes for a person to recover from negative events physiologically because they are continually reliving their past experiences. When individuals adopt a self-distancing perspective, they have been found to have lower blood pressure compared to those with self-immersed perspective both at the initial time of reflection and over time recounting the experience. This suggests that self-distancing may impact physical-health as well.

== Coping mechanism ==
The term distancing is also applied as an attachment style. Attachment theory is a theory describing the formation of emotional bonds between people and the effects of a person's attachment history on emotion regulation and other aspects of personality. Studies have shown that a person's attachment style (secure, anxious, or avoidant) becomes stable with age. Attachment style is assessed by what kind of insecurity an individual has, either through attachment-related anxiety or attachment-related avoidance (distancing). Secure individuals, those with low levels of anxiety and avoidance, cope well with stress because they seek support from trusted attachment figures or use mental depictions of support from the past. Insecure individuals, those with high levels of anxiety or avoidance, do not feel as confident in the availability and responsiveness of others.

Brodmann Area 47 is the lateral prefrontal cortex

Subcallosal cingulate cortex (SCC), anterior cingulate cortex (ACC), medial prefrontal cortex (MPFC) and lateral prefrontal cortex (LPFC) are areas of the brain associated with regulation and suppression of thoughts and emotions. In a neuro-physiological study, it was found that both anxious and avoidant individuals activate the ACC and MPFC regions when told not to think about an event. However, avoidant individuals were found to have an increase in levels of activation of the SCC as opposed to anxious participants. Anxiety individuals also had lower levels of activation in the SCC and the LPFC areas, in line with previous studies, which have shown a decrease in blood flow to prefrontal areas during task-induced deactivation. Avoidant individuals failed to fully deactivate LPFC and SCC regions while suppressing thoughts and emotions. This is comparable to behavioral studies in which these individuals failed to maintain suppression when under cognitive load (such as remembering seven numbers) as opposed to the non-avoidant people who could maintain suppression.

== Other dimensions of distancing ==
Distance also has temporal, spatial, social, and probabilistic dimensions. For example, increased distance between words and what they refer in terms of time and space allows for mental travel into the past and future. In the beginning of development, there is a short distance between words and what they mean and children are only able to comprehend and speak about the concrete. As the distance widens children are able to comprehend location, past, present and future. Language then allows for the communication of abstract and remote ideas. Additionally, being able to look backwards and forwards in time allows for the formation of basic cognition such as prediction, evaluation, and action.

The dimensions of distancing move together, as people remember events from the past also have a unified sense of distance in the future. Politeness implies formal social distance where speaking less formally implies closeness. Participants that read a formal description of an event perceive that the event will happen in the future, implying spatial distance. Probabilistically, people anticipate common occurrence to occur to those close to them as opposed to rare circumstances.

== See also ==
- Distancing language
- Social distance
- Construal level theory
- Coping (psychology)
