= Rudolf Pannwitz =

German writer, poet and philosopher

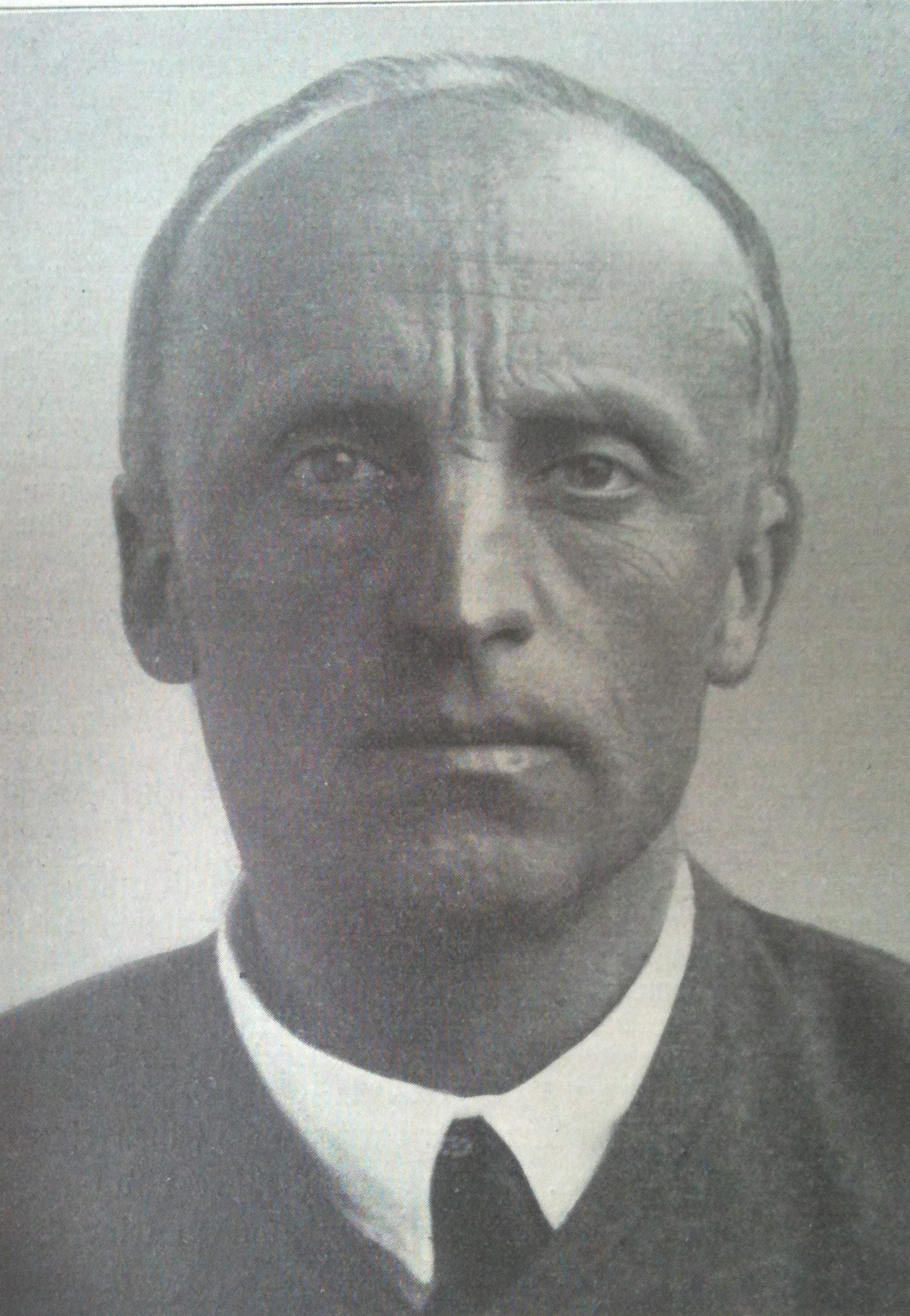
Rudolf Pannwitz

Rudolf Pannwitz (27 May 1881, Crossen/Oder, Province of Brandenburg, Prussia – 23 March 1969, Astano, Switzerland) was a German writer, poet and philosopher. His thought combined nature philosophy, Nietzsche, an opposition to nihilism and pan-European internationalism:

Pannwitz's elusive, difficult goal may be seen as the complete re-evaluation of man, art, science and culture envisaged as the expression of an evolving cosmos obeying the laws of eternal recurrence, with Nietzsche-Zarathustra as the supreme prophet.

== Life ==
Pannwitz was educated at the University of Marburg before moving to Berlin to continue studying. Through Gertrud Kantorowicz, a cousin of Ernst Kantorowicz and friend of Georg Simmel, he was introduced to Sabine Lepsius and the poetry of Stefan George. Pannwitz's poem 'Das Totengedicht' [The Poem of the Dead] was published in George's literary magazine, Blätter für die Kunst. George and Nietzsche were lasting influences upon Pannwitz. In 1904 Pannwitz cofounded the periodical Charon with Otto zur Linde, co-editing it until 1906. His 1917 book The Crisis of European Culture impressed Hugo von Hofmannsthal, though Hofmannsthal later distanced himself from Pannwitz.

From 1921 to 1948 Pannwitz lived on the small island of Koločep. In 1968 he received the Gryphius Prize.

== Works ==
=== Prose ===
- Die Erziehung, 1909
- Formenkunde der Kirche, 1912
- Die Krisis der europäischen Kultur, 1917
- Die deutsche Lehre, 1919
- Grundriß einer Geschichte meiner Kultur 1886 bis 1906, 1921
- Kosmos Atheos, 1926
- Die Freiheit der Menschen, 1926
- Logos, Eidos, Bios, 1930
- Der Ursprung und das Wesen der Geschlechter, 1936
- Nietzsche und die Verwandlung des Menschen, 1940
- Weg des Menschen, 1942
- Das Weltalter und die Politik, 1948
- Der Nihilismus und die werdende Welt, 1951
- Nach Siebzig Jahren, 1951
- Beiträge zu einer europäischen Kultur, 1954

=== Poetry ===
- Prometheus, 1902
- Dionysische Tragödien, 1913
- Mythen, 1919-1921, In 9 Parts, including Das Kind Aion, Der Elf, Das Lied vom Ehlen, Faustus und Helena, Der Gott, and Logos.
- Urblick, 1926
- Hymnen aus Widars Wiederkehr, 1927
- König Laurin, 1956
- Wasser wird sich ballen, 1963
