= Margarete Susman =

Margarete Susman (married: Margarete von Bendemann; October 14, 1872 – January 16, 1966) was a German-Jewish poet, writer, and critic who lived much of her life in Switzerland. The author of hundreds of essays, five collections of poetry, and notable literary-critical works, she distinguished herself as a philosophical writer addressing vital questions in literature, politics, culture and religion. Her 1946 work Das Buch Hiob und das Schicksal des jüdischen Volkes (1946), a reflection on Jewish history through the lens of the Biblical Book of Job, was one of the earliest postwar Jewish theological responses to the Holocaust.

== Biography ==
Susman was born in Hamburg, the daughter of Adolph Susman, a businessman (1836–1892), and Jenni Susman (née Katzenstein, 1845–1906). Her parents were of Jewish heritage, with a mostly secular outlook, and Susman received no formal Jewish education as a child. When she was around 10 or 11 years old, her family moved to Zurich, Switzerland. In Zurich she attended a public school for girls (Höhere Töchterschule), where she was educated in the Protestant faith. Later, when she was in her twenties, she sought out further instruction in Judaism from the Reform rabbi Caesar Seligmann.

Although her father would not consent to her attending the University of Zurich, she eventually studied art in Düsseldorf and Paris; and, later, art history and philosophy at LMU Munich, where she studied philosophy with Theodor Lipps. At Munich, she met Gertrud Kantorowicz, with whom she formed a lasting friendship. At the beginning of the 1900s she moved to Berlin, where she again studied philosophy, and participated in the seminars of Georg Simmel at the University of Berlin, who remained her friend and mentor until his death in 1918. In the circle around Simmel, she also formed friendships with the religious philosopher Martin Buber and the philosopher and historian Bernard Groethuysen.

In the course of her art studies Susman met the painter and art historian Eduard von Bendemann (born 1877, a grandson of the painter Eduard Bendemann), whom she married in 1906. Their son Erwin was born the same year. During the First World War the family lived in Rüschlikon, Switzerland, and afterward returned to Germany, settling in a small village in southern Germany, and later in Frankfurt am Main. Susman and her husband divorced in 1928.

From 1907 through the end of the Weimar Republic, Susman was a regular contributor to the Frankfurter Zeitung. She also contributed to Buber's journal Der Jude (The Jew), founded during World War I, and, after 1925, to the Frankfurt-based German-Jewish periodical Der Morgen (The Morning).

Following the seizure of power by Hitler and the National Socialists in Germany in 1933, Susman emigrated to Zurich, where she spent the rest of her life. There she came into close association with the Protestant socialist theologian Leonhard Ragaz, and became a contributor to Ragaz's journal Neue Wege (New paths).

Not long before her death in Zurich, in 1966, Susmann completed a memoir, Ich habe viele Leben gelebt (I have lived many lives).

== Selected works ==
Poetry collections

- Mein Land: Gedichte. 1901
- Neue Gedichte. 1907
- Vom Sinn der Liebe. 1912
- Die Liebenden: drei dramatische Gedichte. 1917
- Lieder von Tod und Erlösung. 1922
- Aus sich wandelnder Zeit. 1953

Prose

- Das Wesen der modernen deutschen Lyrik [The nature of modern German lyrical poetry]. 1910
- Der Expressionismus [Expressionism]. 1918
- Die Frauen der Romantik [Women of the Romantic period]. 1929. 3rd expanded and revised edition, 1960
- Das Buch Hiob und das Schicksal des jüdischen Volkes [The Book of Job and the fate of the Jewish people]. 1946
- Deutung einer grossen Liebe: Goethe und Charlotte von Stein [Interpretation of a great love: Goethe and Charlotte von Stein]. 1951
- Gestalten und Kreise [Personalities and groups]. 1954
- Die geistige Gestalt Georg Simmels [The spiritual character of Georg Simmel]. 1959.
- Ich habe viele Leben gelebt: Erinnerungen [memoir]. 1964
- Vom Geheimnis der Freiheit: Gesammelte Aufsätze, 1914-1964 [collected essays]. 1965
- Gesammelte Schriften. 5 vols., ed. by Anke Gilleir and Barbara Hahn [collected works]. 2022

Essays in translation

- "Franz Rosenzweig's The Star of Redemption", translated by Joachim Neugroschel. In: Arthur A. Cohen (ed.), The Jew, Essays from Martin Buber's Journal Der Jude, 1916-1928. University of Alabama Press, 1980. ISBN 9780817369088
- "God the creator". In: Nahum N. Glatzer (Ed.), The Dimensions of Job: A Study and Selected Readings. Eugene, OR: Wipf and Stock, 2002 (originally published by Schocken Books, 1969). ISBN 9781592440061. p. 86-92. According to the editor's note, this piece is a translation of the introductory part of Susman's essay on Franz Kafka, contained in her book Gestalten und Kreise (1954); the translation was first published in the Labor Zionist periodical Jewish Frontier (New York), vol. 23, September 1956
