= Social distance =

Sociological concept of distance between groups in society

In sociology, social distance describes the distance between individuals or social groups in society, including dimensions such as social class, race/ethnicity, gender or sexuality. Members of different groups mix less than members of the same group. It is the measure of nearness or intimacy that an individual or group feels towards another individual or group in a social network or the level of trust one group has for another and the extent of perceived likeness of beliefs.

== History ==
Modern research into social distance is primarily attributed to work by sociologist Georg Simmel. Simmel's conceptualization of social distance was represented in his writings about a hypothetical stranger that was simultaneously near and far from contact with his social group.

Simmel's lectures on the topic were attended by Robert Park, who later extended Simmel's ideas to the study of relations across racial/ethnic groups. At the time, racial tensions in the US had brought intergroup relations to the forefront of academic interest. Robert Park tasked his student, Emory Bogardus, to create a quantifiable measure of social distance. Bogardus' creation of the first Social Distance Scale played a large role in popularizing Park's and Bogardus conceptualization of social distance, which had some significant differences from Simmel's original ideas.

Contemporary studies of social distance do exhibit some features of a cohesive body of literature, but the definitions and frameworks sometimes show significant variations across researchers and disciplines.

== Dimensions ==
Nedim Karakayali put forth a framework that described four dimensions of social distance:

1. Affective social distance: One widespread view of social distance is affectivity. Social distance is associated with affective distance, i.e. how much sympathy the members of a group feel for another group. Emory Bogardus, the creator of "Bogardus social distance scale" was typically basing his scale on this subjective-affective conception of social distance: "[i]n social distance studies the center of attention is on the feeling reactions of persons toward other persons and toward groups of people."
2. Normative social distance: A second approach views social distance as a normative category. Normative social distance refers to the widely accepted and often consciously expressed norms about who should be considered as an "insider" and who an "outsider/foreigner". Such norms, in other words, specify the distinctions between "us" and "them". Therefore, normative social distance differs from affective social distance, because it conceives social distance is conceived as a non-subjective, structural aspect of social relations. Examples of this conception can be found in some of the works of sociologists such as Georg Simmel, Emile Durkheim and to some extent Robert Park.
3. Interactive social distance: Focuses on the frequency and intensity of interactions between two groups, claiming that the more the members of two groups interact, the closer they are socially. This conception is similar to the approaches in sociological network theory, where the frequency of interaction between two parties is used as a measure of the "strength" of the social ties between them.
4. Cultural and habitual distance: Focuses cultural and habitual which is proposed by Bourdieu (1990). This type of distance is influenced by the "capital" people possess.

It is possible to view these different conceptions as "dimensions" of social distance, that do not necessarily overlap. The members of two groups might interact with each other quite frequently, but this does not always mean that they will feel "close" to each other or that normatively they will consider each other as the members of the same group. In other words, interactive, normative and affective dimensions of social distance might not be linearly associated.

== Measurement ==
Some ways social distance can be measured include: direct observation of people interacting, questionnaires, speeded decision making tasks, route planning exercises, or other social drawing tasks (see sociogram).

Bogardus Social Distance Scale and its variations remain the most popular measure of social distance. In questionnaires based on Bogardus' scale, respondents are typically asked members of which groups they would accept in particular relationships. For example, to check whether or not they would accept a member of each group as a neighbor, as a fellow worker as a marriage partner. The social distance questionnaires may not accurately measure what people actually would do if a member of another group sought to become a friend or neighbour. The social distance scale is only an attempt to measure one's feeling of unwillingness to associate equally with a group. What a person will actually do in a situation also depends upon the circumstances of the situation.

== Theoretical implications ==
=== Psychological distance ===
Some researchers have examined social distance as a form of psychological distance. Research in this vein has drawn connections between social distance, other kinds of psychological distance (such as temporal distance). This type of work also examined the effect of social distance on construal levels, suggesting that greater social distance promotes high-level and increase cognitive abstraction.

In speeded decision making tasks, studies have suggested a systematic relationship between social distance and physical distance. When asked to either indicate the spatial location of a presented word or verify a word's presence, people respond more quickly when "we" was displayed in a spatially proximate versus spatially distant location and when "others" was displayed in a spatially distant versus a spatially proximate location. This suggests that social distance and physical distance are conceptually related.

Route planning exercises have also hinted at a conceptual link between social distance and physical distance. When asked to draw a route on a map, people tend to draw routes closer to friends they pass along the way and further away from strangers. This effect is robust even after controlling for how easy it is for the people passing one another to communicate.

There is some evidence that reasoning about social distance and physical distance draw on shared processing resources in the human parietal cortex.

== Practical implications ==
=== Prejudice ===
Social distance can emerge between groups that differ on a variety of dimensions, including culture, race/ethnicity, and socioeconomic class. Construal level theory suggests that greater social distance can contribute to a reliance on stereotypes when evaluating socially distant individuals/groups.

The relationship between social distance and prejudice is documented in studies of attitudes towards individuals who suffer from a mental illness. Distance from the mentally ill and the desire to maintain it depends on the diagnosis, and varies across age groups and nationalities. The desire to maintain social distance is reduced with exposure to/familiarity with mental illness, and increased with perceptions that mentally ill individuals are dangerous.

=== Generosity ===
Social distance has been incorporated in economic decision making experiments using the ultimatum game and the dictator game. In this line of work, researchers increase social distance by anonymizing economic decisions. This work finds that social distance reduces altruistic behavior. A similar line of work aimed to reduce social distance by increasing social cues, or by incorporating minimal forms of interaction. These manipulations showed that decreasing social distance increases generosity.

=== Power ===
Research on the relationship between power and social distance suggests that powerful individuals have a greater perception of distance from others. Based on construal level theory, this means that powerful individuals are more likely to engage in high-level construals. This connection between power, social distance, and construal level has been used to explain other features of cognitions and behaviors related to power, including findings that powerful individuals are less likely to be influenced by others [#45], and more likely to engage in stereotyping. This work also has important implications given that greater social distance reduces generosity.

=== Media influence ===
Social distance has also been examined in the context of third-person effects. The third-person effect describes individuals' tendency to assume that media messages have a greater influence on those other than themselves. Some work has shown that this effect increases the greater the distance from the self; in other words, the greater the social distance between an individual and a hypothetical target, the greater the perceived influence of the media message on the target. This phenomenon has been dubbed the social distance corollary.

=== Housing ===
Social periphery is a term often used in conjunction with social distance. It refers to people being 'distant' with regard to social relations. It is often implied that it is measured from the dominant city élite. The social periphery of a city is often located in the centre.

Locational periphery in contrast is used to describe places physically distant from the heart of the city. These places often include suburbs which are socially close to the core of the city. In some cases the locational periphery overlaps with the social periphery, such as in Paris' banlieues.

In 1991, Geoff Mulgan stated that "The centres of two cities are often for practical purposes closer to each other than to their own peripheries." This reference to social distance is especially true for global cities.

== See also ==
- Bogardus Social Distance Scale
- Social Distance Corollary
