= Pornography consumption by adolescents =

Pornography consumption by adolescents is considered a normal part of their sexual development, as it is easily accessible and integrated into their social circles as a useful means of arousal, entertainment, and learning. This is further exacerbated by a failure of sex education to sufficiently meet young people's sexual development needs, which leads them to seeking out pornography to get information about sex and to explore their sexuality in order to make sense of it and affirm their sexual identity. Besides that, adolescents use pornography out of mating motives as a coping mechanism and to alleviate boredom. However, they may also encounter content that distresses them and may struggle to reconcile messages they receive from pornography with their own values or the values of society, which may lead to experiencing feelings of conflict, guilt, and shame. Due to educators, parents, and other adults failing to see pornography as a normal component of youth lives, they lack spaces to process and discuss experiences with pornography. Without adequate support, some developing the skills to seek out content that affirms their sexuality and learning when content is unrealistic and to avoid content that causes discomfort. Without alternative narratives, it may also reinforce harmful attitudes about women, sex, LGBTQ people, and people of color, and unrealistic expectations and harmful behaviors related to sex. The use of pornography by adolescents is associated with certain sexual attitudes and behaviors, but causal relationships remain unclear. It can be assumed that adolescents are not passive "fools" or "victims". The typical adolescent consumer of pornography is male, in advanced stages of puberty, sensation-seeking, and often grapples with weak or disrupted family relationships.

== Demography ==
Research on adolescent pornography consumption examined young people aged between 10 and 24 on average. The chosen age range is justified by concerns about the effects of consumption, particularly in this age group. With a focus on youth aged 10 to 17. When adolescents view pornography, it may be intentional or unintentional. Among the initial and ongoing exposure points are free pornography websites, advertising on websites or pop-up ads, internet searches for words with multiple meanings or related to health content, entertainers' websites, and family members, friends, or partners. In one study, pornography was introduced by family members to encourage heterosexual behaviors and discourage same-sex activity. Social media was noted in frequent and often unintentional exposure to pornography. It was characterized by some as ubiquitous and impossible to avoid and easily accessible. It was considered common by young people, even when it was not intentionally sought after or when barriers to pornography access were put in place. Some demonstrated skills to locate preferred pornography content even when it was behind a paywall. When young people want to access preferred pornography, they also manage to get past payment barriers, identity verification, and website blocking by parents and schools. These barriers were not perceived as deterrents by young people and could be easily overcome if desired.

Several young people described the need to strategize their use by ensuring privacy at home, such as deleting their internet history. They assumed that most teens had been exposed to pornography, as they saw it as a part of daily life and a natural aspect of sexuality. They spoke with comfort, familiarity, and openness about pornography, for one study author, indicated a "shift in the position (of pornography) as perverse, deviant, or shameful." The prevalence of use ranges from 7% to 98%; at least a sizable minority of all adolescents use pornography. Methodological differences, technological changes, and cultural context (e.g., sex education and sexual liberalism) have been noted as reasons for this difference. Male adolescents with autism viewed pornography less often than neurotypical adolescents (ASD 41% vs. neurotypical 76%) and/or masturbated less regularly with pornography (ASD 39% vs. neurotypical 76%). In contrast, no difference was found among female adolescents. The age of first use ranges from 6 to 19 years for heterosexual adolescents, with an average age of 11 years for boys and 12 years for girls. The first use of pornography ranges from 6 to 17 years for LGBTQ adolescents. The frequency of use among LGBTQ youth in the literature is often contradictory, with some studies reporting higher frequency than heterosexual youth and others not.

=== Content ===
It is unclear how many adolescents encounter violent pornography. One survey found about 3 % had viewed violent content, while another reported 29 % of boys and 16 % of girls. Among urban, low‑income Black and Hispanic youth in the U.S., the most common pornography was heterosexual sex, but they also encountered extreme content such as humiliation, bestiality, bondage, and bukkake. Some adolescents reacted with discomfort or disgust. Researchers suggested these reactions may stem from general discomfort with sexual behavior, social expectations to disapprove of pornography, exposure to "shock" videos or depictions of violence or non‑consensual acts, or the lack of intimacy in pornography, which some described as "very shallow" and focused only on sexual acts and genitals. Frequent users often reported conflicted feelings, especially regarding the ethics of how women and marginalized groups are portrayed. Many believed pornography is made for cisgender heterosexual men, prioritizes their pleasure, positions women to satisfy men, and fetishizes lesbians, transgender, and nonbinary people for heterosexual male viewers. Both male and female participants described pornography as misogynistic or reinforcing male dominance and female submission. They also noted limited representation of Black and Latine actors, saying pornography upholds white beauty standards and stereotypical depictions of Black and Latina women.

Some experienced guilt or shame—finding pornography enjoyable when aroused but afterward questioning what they had watched and describing it as absurd or unrealistic. These feelings got attributed to internal conflict and conscience: adolescents struggled to reconcile pornography's emotional and physiological benefits with their critiques of pornography's ethics along with the lack of social acceptance for pornography and sexuality in general. Pornography was seen as sitting between modern and traditional sexual values, private versus public behavior, and a fearful public debate versus the normalization of sexualized media. With some saying that other youth, especially younger adolescents, might be negatively impacted by pornography. Researchers attributed this to social desirability bias and the "third‑person effect," where young people reproduce common narratives about adolescents' vulnerability. They also lacked support systems—parents and schools were described as avoiding conversations about pornography, and some youth feared punishment if caught viewing it. Creating a perception of adults as ambivalent or unsafe to approach with questions, to hear alternative narratives to misogynistic, racist, and violent themes in pornography. Peers also offered few spaces to discuss experiences. For some, participating in interviews and focus groups functioned as the first opportunity to talk about their experiences with porn. Despite limited support, some adolescents felt they had developed skills to manage their pornography use, avoid unwanted content, and cope with conflicting feelings, as well as mitigate conflicting feelings and potential consequences that could result from viewing pornography. They described detailed search strategies to find preferred material, avoid negative content, and prevent negative feelings. Their ability to manage pornography was supported by good relationships and spaces where young people could speak openly and authentically.

An Umbrella Review stated on this aspect of the types of pornography teens use: "More research is needed on the types of pornography teens use, rather than relying on speculation and opinion. It should be assumed that adolescents are not passive "fools" or "victims" but are critical and active in interpreting various media."

== Predictors ==
Predictors (forecasting characteristics) are characteristics that predict increased use of pornography. Here, only intentional use of pornography is considered. Predictive characteristics change when access to pornography changes (e.g., through restricted access) or when the cultural context changes (e.g., where use is or is not socially normal).

=== Demographic factors ===
Compared to their female counterparts, male adolescents use pornography more often. These gender differences in the use of pornography are less distinct in more liberal countries than in less liberal countries. No differences were found in exposure to pornography with themes of affection, dominance, or violence. Bisexual or homosexual male adolescents have been found to use Internet pornography more often than heterosexual male adolescents. When it comes to the influence of use on academic performance, results are mixed, with some studies finding a relation and others finding no relation.

=== Personality factors ===
Sensation-seeking adolescents use pornography more frequently than their peers. However, there is no influence of sensation-seeking on the choice of Internet pornography themes (i.e., affection, dominance, violence). Similarly, adolescents with lower self-control consumed more Internet pornography. Adolescents who were less satisfied with their lives are also more likely to use Internet pornography. For self-esteem, results are mixed. Lower perceived autonomy was associated with more frequent pornography use, as was greater self-efficacy. Adolescents with a hyperfeminine or hypermasculine gender orientation were more likely to come into contact with violent depictions in Internet pornography than adolescents without such a hypergender orientation.

=== Norm factors ===
Norm-related variables refer to concepts that deal with the extent to which adolescents comply with or reject norms and values in a given society. Youth who break rules or who use psychotropic substances are more likely to use pornography. Pornography use is most characteristic of a group of youth referred to as "minor delinquents." For religious youth and those who attend religious schools, the results are contradictory. Some studies showed that pornography use is lower among religious youth, while others didn't. Negative attitudes toward school as well as having friends who engage in deviant activities were associated with a greater use of Internet pornography. As for adolescents' sexual interest, those with greater sexual interest, as well as those who also used sexual content in other media, were also more often exposed to Internet pornography. Use of Internet pornography is higher among adolescents with better digital skills, while pornography use is not related to adolescents' computer skills. Internet pornography use appears to be lower when filtering software is installed. Adolescents who used Internet pornography more frequently also used the Internet more frequently in general and for a variety of activities, including file sharing, sex education, talking to strangers, playing Internet games, and buying goods.

=== Developmental factors ===
Some studies showed that pornography use increases with age, while others found no such increase. Younger adolescents seem to respond more strongly to Internet pornography with the theme of affection, while older adolescents respond more strongly to pornography with the theme of dominance. More frequent use of Internet pornography occurs in both boys and girls with advanced puberty. Greater sexual experience was associated with more frequent use of Internet pornography, and in another study, less frequent use of Internet pornography among girls in another. Competencies such as the ability to solve problems, set goals, make effective behavioral decisions, and act accordingly were associated with more frequent pornography use. In contrast, positive youth development traits (e.g., social competence, self-efficacy, and moral competence) were associated with less frequent pornography use, both on the Internet and in less traditional media.

=== Social factors ===
Lower family commitment, poor family functioning in general, and specifically less mutuality in family functioning with greater pornography use. The same was true for a poor emotional bond with the caregiver for Internet pornography and a caregiver who used coercive discipline for traditional pornography. In addition, family conflict and poor family communication were related to more pornography use on the Internet and in traditional media, albeit mediated by less positive youth development. Weaker prosocial attitudes also correlated with more frequent pornography use. Restrictive parental mediation and installed blocking software were associated with less pornography use on the Internet. In contrast, parental control and parents talking about Internet pornography with their children were found to be unrelated to adolescents' use of Internet pornography.

More frequent use of online pornography occurs when the majority of the youth's friends were younger, when the youth used the Internet at their friends' homes, when they communicated more frequently with their friends about pornography (males only), and when peers perceived them to use pornography (females only). Popularity with same-sex peers, popularity with opposite-sex peers, desire for popularity, and peer pressure were linked with more frequent pornography use. Peer attachment is unrelated to adolescent use of Internet pornography. In terms of victimization, adolescents are more likely to use Internet pornography if they have been harassed online and victimized in their offline lives.

=== Effect factors ===
Internet pornography use predicted permissive attitudes, while permissive attitudes did not predict pornography use. The use of Internet pornography not only predicted stronger stereotypical beliefs over time, but stereotypical beliefs also predicted a more frequent use of Internet pornography. This was significantly stronger for male than for female adolescents and was explained by liking pornography. The use of Internet pornography predicted greater sexual preoccupancy, greater sexual uncertainty, and greater sexual dissatisfaction, but neither sexual preoccupancy nor sexual uncertainty nor sexual dissatisfaction consistently predicted the use of Internet pornography.

The typical adolescent pornography user is a male, pubertally more advanced, sensation-seeking, with weak or troubled family relationships.

== Motivations ==
Curiosity and Learning
Adolescents initially view pornography out of curiosity about sex or pornography itself or to learn how to perform oral, anal, and vaginal sex; what goes where; what to do; how sexual organs work; how to masturbate and ejaculate; how to perform sex positions; performance; roles; responsibilities; and potential feelings during different sexual activities (e.g., whether pain is normal in certain acts). To explore bodies and sexual activities without the emotional or physiological risks of engaging with a partner or to generally gain a better understanding about sexual activity. The usefulness of this information can be predictive of the individual's engagement with it. Especially "amateur" pornography is believed to support self-esteem, to help determine readiness for sex, reduce anxiety about early experiences, and to increase satisfaction in both committed and casual relationships, and to more comfortably think and communicate about sex. Pornography also helps adolescents explore their own or others' sexual orientation, what they find arousing, seeing themselves as sexual beings, and processing orientation or gender identity. For some, it was their first exposure to gay culture. Pornography was described as a "safe space" for sexual exploration and expression and as a tool for "sense-making" for sexual identities and feelings that are stigmatized in mainstream culture, particularly among young women and LGBTQ+ youth. LGBTQ adolescents reported that pornography often appeared as the first search result when seeking sexual information online. They reported that pornography was the only source of information about LGBTQ sexual activities, and they referred to pornography as a "manual" to sex; they emphasized, however, that they would have used other sources if relevant information had been more easily available. As they grow older, young people may continue to use pornography as an instructional resource, exploring sexual roles and expectations, studying the mechanics and techniques of specific acts, or identifying new practices to introduce into relationships. Lack of personal experience or inadequate sexual education and lack of sexual information about the mechanics of sex led people to engage with pornography. This was especially noted among men who have sex with men, who did not see their ways of having sex represented in mainstream media culture. Sexuality education from caregivers and schools was reported as insufficient, often limited to STI and pregnancy risks, focused narrowly on heterosexual sex, or skipped entirely. Because of this, pornography gained value as a source of information unavailable elsewhere. It was seen as inevitable or necessary for learning about sex. Youth saw better communication about pornography and sex as a way to improve young people's outlook about sex, decrease motivation to seek out pornography, reduce sexual stigma and abuse, and demonstrate trust and respect for young people. Young people recommended the expansion of sexuality education programs.

Arousal and enhancement
The psychological reinforcement of masturbation, or the satisfaction of sexual desire, is one of the main reasons for the use of pornography, especially among boys. Adolescents sometimes use it as a substitute for intimacy after a breakup or when a partner is unavailable.

Intimacy and Mate-Seeking Motives
Some individuals, particularly women, use pornography with the intention of enhancing intimacy or relationships. In heterosexual relationships, some partners use internet pornography to satisfy their significant others or to improve sexual intimacy. While less than 20% of men reported using pornography with a partner, about 90% used it alone. However, shared consumption is not the primary motivation. There is a growing trend among young adults to incorporate pornography into their relationships, indicating a shift in consumption motivations. Nevertheless, not everyone sees shared consumption as normal. Some young women view it as a potential threat to the relationship or experienced discordance with their partners' desire to include pornography in the relationship, especially if pressured to use pornography. Shared consumption still tends to adhere to traditional gender roles, with young men more inclined towards it and young women focusing on factors like context, privacy, and regulation. For some women, consuming pornography is only acceptable within a relationship, which can indirectly pressure their consumption habits to deal with pornography outside of socially accepted contexts to protect their privacy and reduce stigma.

Coping Mechanism
Apart from sexual arousal, a significant reason for using pornography is to cope with and alleviate negative emotions. Mood regulation and stress relief are motivations for consuming pornography, helping manage psychological distress, loneliness, and discomfort. Potentially being a causal link between lower mood states and the use of pornography as a coping mechanism. Problematic pornography use is typically predicted by coping with or avoiding negative emotions. Between 5-14% of adolescents are problematic pornography users.

Boredom and Entertainment
Boredom is a common trigger for engaging with pornography, as individuals often seek stimulating activities to alleviate this state. While porn use was described as an exclusively private activity, many young people reported experiences with pornography in social contexts that reinforced views on pornography. Seeking entertainment is another motivation that is more common among boys. Watching pornography with peers or friends allows young individuals to gauge others reactions, helping establish social norms around its consumption, as well as determine specific behaviors, experiences, or bodies seen in pornography.

== Effects of pornography ==
=== Context of research ===
Surveys are the main method for studying the effects of pornography on adolescents because experimental research on adolescents' use of pornography is ethically not possible, as it is usually illegal to show pornography to minors. Furthermore, finding a control group with no exposure to sexually explicit material gets increasingly less possible. The research is based on establishing correlations, precluding the establishment of a causal relationship. This means it is not possible to draw conclusions about whether reported associations are a consequence or a cause of viewing pornography. It could be that individuals who already have stronger permissive attitudes and gender-stereotypical beliefs may be more drawn to pornography. There's also the possibility that the observed correlation is spurious. Such research is unlikely to ever be able to determine or isolate with certainty the 'effect' of pornography. Some behaviors linked to pornography, like engaging in casual sex, anal sex, or having a higher number of partners, may in certain circumstances carry some risks, but none of them, nor holding permissive sexual attitudes, are in themselves inherently harmful.

Most studies come from affluent countries like the Netherlands and Sweden, making it challenging to generalize the findings to more sexually conservative nations like Africa. Research on pornography often concentrates on potential negative effects, largely neglecting positive ones. This can be justified by theoretical considerations and by cultural concerns of the public. It's not known for which types of adolescents the associations of pornography use are the strongest—and for which types of adolescents they are weak or nonexistent, and there's limited information about the impact on LGBTQ youth. The definition of pornography in research varies, with different terms used, such as "X-rated" or "sexualised media", and some studies refrain from providing a specific definition.

=== Sexual behavior ===
Relations between adolescents' use of pornography and their sexual behavior refer to:

- The occurrence of sexual intercourse and experience with different sexual practices
- Casual sex behavior (i.e., sex-related and sexual behavior without relational commitment)
- Sexual risk behavior (i.e., sexual behavior that may increase the likelihood of unhealthy consequences)
- Perpetration and victimization of sexual aggression.

Pornography consumption among adolescents is associated with the occurrence of sexual intercourse, more experience with casual sex, and a higher likelihood of perpetrating or experiencing sexual aggression, especially among female adolescents. However, there was no evidence that more frequent pornography consumption was associated with greater experience of different sexual practices. There is no conclusive evidence of a link between pornography and risky sexual behavior. No conclusions can be drawn about sex without condoms or paid sex. Teenage pregnancy and sexually transmitted diseases have been linked to the use of pornography. The relation between pornography use and sexual aggression was stronger for boys, while that between pornography use and sexual victimization was demonstrated mainly for girls. The association between pornography use and sexual initiation was stronger for girls and adolescents at an early pubertal stage. Girls also showed a stronger relation between pornography use and casual sex behavior in one study, but this evidence is not cumulative. These results are rough, incomplete approximations. On average, adolescents did not engage frequently in sexual intercourse or casual sexual behavior. This means that adolescents' pornography use was associated with a low rate of these behaviors rather than with their massive occurrence. The figures vary when it comes to sexual aggression and sexual victimization. Some adolescents imitate what they see in pornography. Some women experienced forms of coercion and harassment in the context of pornography, including where videos or photos were taken or shared without consent.

=== Gender stereotypical beliefs and permissive behaviors ===
Gender stereotypical beliefs are understood as a belief that traditional, stereotypical ideas about male and female gender roles and gender relations dominate. These beliefs cover progressive attitudes towards gender roles, conceptions of women as sexual objects, gender stereotypical beliefs about power imbalance in sexual relationships, and beliefs about gender equality. Adolescents' pornography use is, on average, related to less progressive (rather than gender stereotypical) sexual beliefs. Permissive sexual behaviors are understood as a positive attitude towards casual sex, often outside of non-binding situations, and romantic relationships. Adolescents' pornography use is, on average, associated, with less strict (rather than more permissive) sexual attitudes. Some studies suggest that the relation between pornography use and both permissive sexual attitudes and gender stereotypical beliefs is explained by cognitive and emotional response states; however, this evidence is not cumulative. Age does not influence the relationship, but some preliminary noncumulative evidence suggests that parental communication about sexuality, may play a role.

=== Perceived realism ===
Adolescents on average do not perceive pornography as (socially) realistic or as a useful source for sexual information. More frequent pornography use, however, made them perceive this material as "less unrealistic". But it sometimes got considered a reliable source of information. They exhibit "porn literacy," showing critical thinking skills. They noted that these skills were employed more easily with age and experience. The differences between pornography and real sexual situations were: Messages about sex, the body, pleasure, and "risky" sexual acts, the lack of emotion, exaggerated appearance and performance, long duration of sex, the speed of sex, the roles of women and men in pornography, the loveless content, the abstinence of condoms, gender or racial stereotypes of appearance and behavior that does not accurately represent people with systemically-marginalized identities and the submissive role of women in pornography were described as unrealistic and misleading as well as objectionable. Young women, in particular, reported concerns relating to their self-image, the unlikely scenarios, and the unrealistic expectations placed on them through watching pornography. Young women who did not watch pornography also stated that they felt insecure about their appearance and their sexual performance. Adolescent girls also pointed out that boys may learn sexual aggression from pornography, with which some boys seemed to agree. While some find it arousing, they questioned the unrealistic aspects of what they have watched.

It was not seen as a useful source for learning about sexual health due to it focusing too much on 'fetish' and 'kinky' behaviours (e.g. fisting, water sports, and bestiality), lacking information about protection from sexually transmissible infections (STIs) and unwanted pregnancies due to the lack of condoms. Some youth were concerned that other consumers (but not themselves) might lead to false lessons or unrealistic expectations (through the third-person effect) from pornography and experience physical harm from replicating pornography. Study authors noted narratives that allowed young people to ignore ethical concerns about the pornography industry. Young men were less likely than young women to engage with pornography critically, describing them as less aware of and more hesitant to discuss how pornography may be perceived differently by gender. They noted that pornography may create expectations for how they personally should behave, look, or act during sex or were concerned that pornography created negative sexual expectations for others (e.g., younger adolescents). Without alternative narratives, they indicated that sexual expectations gleaned from pornography could result in pressure to perform certain sexual acts, lowered self-esteem, discrepancies in expectations between sexual partners, disappointment in a sexual experience, or unnecessary physical pain. One described that pornography conditioned her to do harmful sexual acts that she wouldn't have considered without pornography. Pornography may also perpetuate harmful expectations on stereotypes; one recalled assumptions made by a partner to try to perform anal sex. Youth were concerned that pornography normalized violence; they perceived that watching porn could lead to harassment, coercion, and assault perpetration. One described that the social context in porn pushed the boundaries of rape.

=== Sexual self-development ===
Adolescent sexual self-exploration refers to greater sexual uncertainty, that is, the extent to which adolescents are unclear about their sexual beliefs and values. Self-objectification and the internationalization of appearance ideals, greater body surveillance, sexual preoccupancy (i.e., a strong cognitive engagement in sexual issues, sometimes to the exclusion of other thoughts, as well as sexual fantasizing), greater sexual dissatisfaction over time, and depression or loneliness through pornography: research suggests a connection between pornography use and these aspects, but cumulative correlations have not been established. No consistent evidence was found that the relation between pornography use and sexual self-development was stronger for male or female adolescents. Female adolescents reported both sexual arousal and agony, and male adolescents described both positive and negative feelings about pornography. Female adolescents, in particular, criticized the unattainable body ideals featured in pornography; they also admitted being influenced by these ideals. Considered them a source of sexual information and, more generally, felt pressured by sexual messages in pornography.

=== Adults vs adolescents ===
Adults and adolescents do not differ in their use of Internet pornography; however, associations between pornography use and risky sexual behavior as well as stereotypical gender beliefs have been found among adults but not among adolescents. Both groups showed a connection between pornography and permissive sexual attitudes. It is thus currently unclear whether pornography use has similar or different implications for adolescents and adults. It is suggested that adolescents' brains might be more sensitive to explicit material than the adult brain, but due to a lack of empirical studies, this question cannot be answered definitively.
