= Yaacov Trope =

Social psychologist

- יעקב טרופ
- Occupation: Professor of Psychology
- Awards: SPSP Career Contribution Award (2015); APS Mentor Award (2016)

Academic background
- Education: Tel Aviv University; University of Michigan

Academic work
- Institutions: New York University

Yaacov Trope (Hebrew: יעקב טרופ; born June 17, 1945) is a social psychologist who studies cognitive, motivational, and social factors that enable perspective taking, and effects of emotions and desires on social judgment and decision making. He is a Professor of Psychology at New York University.

Trope won the 2016 Mentor Award from the Association for Psychological Science for his outstanding mentorship and support for psychology students. In 2015, he won the Career Contribution Award from the Society for Personality and Social Psychology and the Thomas M. Ostrom Award for Outstanding Contributions to Social Cognition. Trope is an elected member of the American Academy of Arts and Sciences.

== Biography ==
Trope received his B.A degree in Psychology from Tel Aviv University in 1970. He attended graduate school at the University of Michigan where he obtained a M.A in 1972 and a Ph.D in Social Psychology in 1974. As a scholar from Israel, Trope received a Fulbright fellowship to conduct research with Eugene Bernstein at the University of Michigan from 1979–1980.

Trope was a faculty member at the Hebrew University of Jerusalem from 1974 to 1989 before joining the faculty of New York University in 1990. From 1990–1998, Trope had a joint appointment as a Professor of Psychology at Tel Aviv University.

== Research ==
Trope's research examines social and emotional factors in decision-making. He is especially interested in the process of construal, or how people perceive, comprehend, and interpret the world and make connections. With his colleague Nira Liberman, Trope developed construal level theory to account for relations between perceived psychological distance and the extent to which one's thinking about a given topic or situation will tend to more concrete vs. more abstract. That is, if a situation that has a direct effect on the person, they will tend to think about the situation in a concrete way and their responses will be more immediate. In contrast, if the situation has only a remote effect on the person, they will tend to think about it more abstractly and reason about it more slowly.

Other work has focused specifically on temporal construal, or how distance in time affects one's perceptions of present and future events. Trope and Liberman draw a contrast between high-level construal of temporally distant events, which captures the bigger picture or the overall main point with a few abstract features, and low-level construal of temporally close events, which includes smaller details that do not play an essential role in the event or are of little importance.

Trope's research has examined how people reveal their emotions via facial expression and body language, and how facial expressions in response to intensely joyful or painful events may be surprisingly similar. Trope and his colleagues found that body language provides a more accurate indicator of how one is feeling as compared to facial expressions—a finding that runs counter to what people generally think. While it is sometimes difficult to read emotions from a person's face alone, it is much easier to deduce how the person is feeling when their bodies are visible.

== Books ==
- Chaiken, S., & Trope, Y. (Eds.) (1999). Dual-process theories in social psychology. The Guilford Press.
- Trope, Y., & Higgins, E. T. (1993). Dispositional inferences from behavior. Sage Publications.

== Representative publications ==
- Fujita, K.; Trope, Y.; Liberman, N.; Levin-Sagi, M. (2006). "Construal levels and self-control". Journal of Personality and Social Psychology. 90 (3): 351–367. doi:10.1037/0022-3514.90.3.351. PMC 3153425.
- Liberman, N.; Trope, Y. (1998). "The role of feasibility and desirability considerations in near and distant future decisions: A test of temporal construal theory". Journal of Personality and Social Psychology. 75 (1): 5–18. doi:10.1037/0022-3514.75.1.5.
- Trope, Y. (1986). Self-enhancement and self-assessment in achievement behavior. In R. M. Sorrentino & E. T. Higgins (Eds.), Handbook of motivation and cognition: Foundations of social behavior (pp. 350–378). Guilford Press.
- Trope, Y; Liberman, N (2010). "Construal-level theory of psychological distance". Psychol Rev. 117 (2): 440–63. doi:10.1037/a0018963. PMC 3152826. PMID 20438233. Erratum in Psychological Review, 117(3), 1024.
- Trope, Y.; Liberman, N; Wakslak, C. (2007). "Construal levels and psychological distance: Effects on representation, prediction, evaluation, and behavior". Journal of Consumer Psychology. 17 (2): 83–95. doi:10.1016/S1057-7408(07)70013-X. PMC 3150814. PMID 21822366.
