= Social distance corollary =

The social distance corollary is a theory in communication research that concerns the tendency of people to perceive others to be more susceptible to media influence than they actually are.

This tendency is at the heart of the third-person effect, a phenomenon first defined and investigated by Davison (1983). Since then, much research has born out Davidson's (1983) statement that "in the view of those trying to evaluate the effects of communication, its greatest impact will not be on'me' or 'you', but on them—the third persons." Although "me" and "you" are put in one category, it is implied that some degree of distance exists between self and such close others as friends and lovers (Tsfati & Cohen, 2004). More explicit remoteness exists between "me and you" as a single unit and "them", or others.

== Social distance ==
The notion of social distance was first introduced by the sociologist Emory Bogardus (1925), who referred to it as the degrees of understanding and feeling that people experience regarding each other. Considering the social distance phenomenon an aspect of Davison's (1983) third-person perception, Perloff (1993) articulated it as a complex variable including perceived similarity, familiarity, and identification, and pointed that there are at least two different ways to conceptualize social distance. First, social distance is a continuum going from "just like me" to "not at all like me". Second, social distance reflects the heterogeneity and size of the audience. Perloff (1993), reviewing 16 studies of the third-person effect, acknowledged that the phenomenon is magnified when the hypothetical others are defined in broad terms. Thus, in Perloff's (2002) terms, social distance corollary is "the notion that self-other disparities grow in magnitude with increases in perceived distance between self and comparison others".

The social distance corollary is not dependent on whether there are media effects or not; rather, it is a perceptual phenomenon. To measure estimates of effects on self and others, Brosius and Engel (1996) constructed a questionnaire comprising three independent variables: first person; third person, close distance; and third person, remote distance. In other words, Brosius and Engel varied psychological distance and found that perceived effects were greater for "remote" others. Also it was found that third-person effect reveals itself most strongly among people of higher age and education.

Cohen, Mutz, Price, and Gunther (1988) found that Stanford students perceived media effects to be less on themselves than on other Stanford students; also, other Californians were considered to be more susceptible to media impact than "other Stanford students". A similar study (Gunther, 1991) was done at the University of Minnesota, and the social distance phenomenon was supported. As groups became more broadly defined (other University of Minnesota students, other Minnesota residents), participants' perceptions of media effects on the groups increased.

Investigating the third-person effect in regard to political identification, Duck, Hogg, and Terry (1995) found that perception of self-other differences in media vulnerability are influenced by the subjectively salient social relationship between self and other, and are governed by motivational needs, such as self-esteem, social-identity, and differentiation from others. Other researchers (e.g., Burger, 1981; Schlenker & Miller, 1977) suggested that self-serving biases consider close friends and relatives as an extension of self, whereas such a vague category as "other" might evoke stereotypes in people's minds (Perloff & Fetzer, 1986).

After several studies, the notion of social distance was enshrined as the "social distance corollary" (Meirick, 2005). According to Perloff's review (1999), of the 11 studies that have tested the social-distance notion, 9 confirmed it, articulating this phenomenon as "another factor on which the strength of the third-person effect hinges".
