= People-first language =

Putting the person before the diagnosis

Autism described by identity-first language and person-first language

People-first language or person-first language is the practice of distancing a person from a trait or condition they have by preferring phrases such as "a person with diabetes", "people experiencing homelessness", and "people with substance use disorders" as opposed to identity-first language like "diabetic people", "homeless people", and "substance abusers".

As a form of disability etiquette, the practice is intended to avoid unconsciously stigmatizing or dehumanizing people with chronic illnesses or disabilities by treating them as a secondary characteristics to their personhood, rather than an essential or subsuming component of their identity.

Some organizations have adopted style guidelines preferring or requiring person-first language when writing about disability, though some disabled communities have a majority or otherwise statistically significant preference for identity-first language, including the Deaf, blind, and autistic communities. APA style recommends using either identity-first or person-first language as appropriate for the community or individual being discussed. Phrases like "disabled person", "Deaf person", and "blind person" are generally accepted and often preferred.

== Definition ==
People-first language is a type of linguistic prescription. It aims to avoid perceived and subconscious dehumanization when discussing people with disabilities and is sometimes referred to (for example, by NHS England's style guide) as a type of disability etiquette. People-first language can also be applied to any group that is defined by a condition rather than as a people: for example, "those that are homeless" rather than "the homeless".

Rather than using labels to define individuals with a health issue, people-first language uses terminology that describes individuals as being diagnosed with an illness or disorder. People-first language puts the person before the diagnosis and describes what the person has, not what the person is.

The basic idea is to use a sentence structure that names the person first and the condition second, for example, "people with disabilities" rather than "disabled people" or "disabled," to emphasize that they are people first. Because it is a common practice in English to place an adjective before a noun, the adjective might be replaced with a relative clause such as from "an asthmatic person" to "a person who has asthma."

By using such a sentence structure, the speaker articulates the idea of a disability as a secondary attribute, not a characteristic of a person's identity. See also Distancing (psychology).

== History ==
Recommendations and explanations to use person-first language date back as early as around 1960. In her textbook, Beatrice Wright began her rationale for avoiding the dangers of terminological short cuts like "disabled person" by citing studies from the field of semantics that "show that language is not merely an instrument for voicing ideas but that it also plays a role in shaping ideas" (p. 7). She concludes her arguments: "Since physique does stimulate value judgments, it is particularly important to use expressions insofar as feasible that separate physical attributes from the total person" (p. 8). Another influential rehabilitation psychologist, Carolyn Vash, who also spoke from the perspective of her experience living with quadriplegia from polio, advanced similar arguments for person-first language in an unpublished address in 1959.

The term people-first language first appeared in 1988 as recommended by advocacy groups in the United States. The usage has been widely adopted by speech-language pathologists and researchers, with "person who stutters" (PWS) replacing "stutterer". It has been used in AIDS activism, appearing in the Denver Principles (1983), which stated in part, "We condemn attempts to label us as 'victims', a term which implies defeat, and we are only occasionally 'patients', a term which implies passivity, helplessness, and dependence upon the care of others. We are 'People With AIDS'".

Its use has been recommended in other increasingly common chronic conditions, such as asthma and diabetes. Non-profit organizations, such as the Obesity Action Coalition have expanded advocacy for People-First Language to obesity. As of 2017, 5 U.S. medical societies had pledged for it, and use it in their communications: the American Society for Metabolic and Bariatric Surgery, The Obesity Society, American Society of Bariatric Physicians, Academy of Nutrition and Dietetics, and the American Academy of Orthopaedic Surgeons.

Some advocacy groups and organizations such as Autism Speaks, The Arc, and Disability Is Natural support using people-first language.

== Rationale ==
In people-first language, preconceptions judged to be negative are thought to arise from placing the name of the condition before the term "person" or "people", such as "white person" or "Jewish people". Proponents of people-first language argue that this places an undue focus on the condition, which distracts from the humanity of the members of the community of people with the condition.

A 2008 experiment researched teenagers' perception of epilepsy with respect to people-first language. Teenagers from a summer camp were divided into two groups. One group was asked questions using the term "people with epilepsy", and the other group was asked using the term "epileptics", with questions including "Do you think that people with epilepsy/epileptics have more difficulties at school?" and "Do you have prejudice toward people with epilepsy/epileptics?" The study showed that the teenagers had higher "stigma perception" on the Stigma Scale of Epilepsy when hearing the phrase "epileptics" as opposed to "people with epilepsy".

Ellen M. Markman outlined research comparing the use of descriptive nouns (i.e. "John is a liberal") and adjectives (i.e. "John is liberal"). The statements using nouns tended to be perceived as stronger statements which conveyed more information. Subjects also explained that they felt that nouns conveyed more stereotyped information and seemed to refer to more central, permanent features of the person in question. Susan A. Gelman and Gail D. Heyman tested lexicalization, using a noun label for a property, by telling children about characteristics with both noun labels ("She is a carrot-eater") and verbal predicates ("She eats carrots whenever she can"). The children perceived the characteristics to be significantly more stable when referred to by a noun.

== Usage guidelines ==
=== United States ===
Some U.S. organizations like the United Spinal Association have published disability etiquette guides, which prescribe people-first language. The 2007 For Dummies guide to etiquette prescribed people-first language.

As of 2017, the rules of people-first language have become normative in US governmental institutions on the federal (e.g. CDC) and on state levels in the health departments' Developmental Disabilities Councils e.g. Michigan West Virginia Idaho, Missouri Georgia, or Texas.

As of 2007, it has been a requirement in AMA Manual of Style for academic journals. APA style says that both people-first and identity-first language are acceptable but stresses using the preferred style of the group or individuals involved (if they have one).

=== United Kingdom ===
NHS England's style guide calls for identity-first language in one instance (using "disabled people" rather than "people with a disability"), but remains ambivalent between people-first and identity-first languages in other examples (such as recommending "People with a learning disability or autistic people". The UK government recommends people-first terminology such as "people with health conditions or impairments" but accepts the terms "disabled people", "deaf", and "blind" to reflect general acceptance by the relevant communities. NHS Highland encourages "the use of 'people first' language; language that focuses first on the person, not the behaviour" when communicating about drug and alcohol use.

== Criticism ==
The most common alternative to person-first language is usually called identity-first language. For example, while someone who advocates for person-first language might refer to a client as a "person with autism", the same client may prefer identity-first language, and ask to be called an "autistic person". Others have proposed "person-centered language", which, instead of being a replacement linguistic rule, promotes prioritizing the preferences of those who are being referred to and argues for greater nuance in the language used to describe people and groups of people.

Autistic activist Jim Sinclair rejects person-first language on the grounds that "person with autism" suggests autism can be separated from the person. Identity-first language is preferred by many autistic people and organizations run by them. Autistic activist Ly Xīnzhèn M. Zhǎngsūn Brown stated in a 2011 blog post republished in 2012 by the Autistic Self Advocacy Network:

In the autism community, many self-advocates and their allies prefer terminology such as "Autistic," "Autistic person," or "Autistic individual" because we understand autism as an inherent part of an individual's identity. ... It is impossible to affirm the value and worth of an Autistic person without recognizing his or her identity as an Autistic person. Referring to me as "a person with autism," or "an individual with ASD" demeans who I am because it denies who I am. ... When we say "person with autism," we say that it is unfortunate and an accident that a person is Autistic ... that the person would be better off if not Autistic, and that it would have been better if he or she had been born typical.

In 1993, the National Federation of the Blind in the US adopted a resolution condemning people-first language. The resolution dismissed the notion that "the word 'person' must invariably precede the word 'blind' to emphasize the fact that a blind person is first and foremost a person" as "totally unacceptable and pernicious" and resulting in the exact opposite of its purported aim, since "it is overly defensive, implies shame instead of true equality, and portrays the blind as touchy and belligerent".

In Deaf culture, person-first language has long been rejected. Instead, Deaf culture uses Deaf-first language since being culturally Deaf is a source of positive identity and pride. Correct terms to use for this group would be "Deaf person" or "hard of hearing person". The phrase "hearing impaired" is not acceptable to most deaf or hard of hearing people because it emphasizes what they cannot do.

Critics have objected that people-first language is awkward and repetitive and makes for tiresome writing and reading. C. Edwin Vaughan, a sociologist and longtime activist for the blind, argues that since "in common usage positive pronouns usually precede nouns", "the awkwardness of the preferred language focuses on the disability in a new and potentially negative way." According to Vaughan, it serves only to "focus on disability in an ungainly new way" and "calls attention to a person as having some type of 'marred identity'" in terms of Erving Goffman's theory of identity. In the social model of disability, a person "is" disabled by societal and environmental factors. However, most people with visual impairment are not blind. Likewise, most people with hearing impairment are not profoundly deaf.

== See also ==
- Head-directionality parameter, regarding the placement of adjectives before or after nouns
- Political correctness
- Psychological distancing
- Slavery Terminology
