= Tom Ostrom =

American psychologist (1936–1994)

Thomas Marshall Ostrom (March 1, 1936 – May 16, 1994) was a psychologist who helped further the study of social psychology. Prior to Ostrom, the field explored and identified the cognitive foundations of social activity. Ostrom pushed the field to studying the social foundations of cognitive activity.

== Career ==
Ostrom was born in Mishawaka, Indiana. He received a bachelor's degree from Wabash College in 1958 and a Ph.D. from the University of North Carolina in 1964. He joined the faculty of the Ohio State University that same year, and remained there the rest of his life.

Ostrom was noted for his work advancing attitude theory and methodology. His work helped further the "ABC" tripartite model of attitudes (affect, behavior, cognition). He also furthered the field of attitude measurement with more valid and reliable rating scales. His research program on impression formation demonstrated the role of memory in social judgment.

In addition to his own work in the field, Ostrom was a talented administrator. In his thirty years at Ohio State, Ostrom helped develop the program into one of the premier graduate training programs in social psychology. He was the organizer of "social cognition week" at the Nags Head Conference Center and founder of the Person Memory Interest Group, developing both events into among of the key conferences in the field of social psychology. From 1980 to 1987 he served as editor of the Journal of Experimental Social Psychology, developing it into one of the most innovative journals in the field.

== Thomas M. Ostrom Award ==
The Person Memory Interest Group honored Ostrom following his death by giving their highest annual award in his honor.

=== Ostrom Award winners ===
- 1998 - Robert S. Wyer
- 1999 - E. Tory Higgins
- 2000 - David L. Hamilton
- 2001 - Anthony Greenwald
- 2002 - Steven J. Sherman
- 2003 - Susan Fiske & Shelley Taylor
- 2004 - Eliot R. Smith
- 2005 - Norbert Schwarz & Fritz Strack
- 2006 - Russell Fazio
- 2007 - Marilynn Brewer
- 2008 - Mick Rothbart
- 2009 - Donal E. Carlston
- 2010 - Charles (Chick) Judd & Bernadette Park
- 2011 - John Bargh
- 2012 - Reid Hastie
- 2013 - Jim Uleman
- 2014 - Patricia Devine
- 2015 - Yaacov Trope
