= Marianne Simmel =

German-American psychologist

Marianne Leonore Simmel (3 January 1923 – 24 March 2010) was a German-American psychologist with a special interest in cognitive neuropsychology.

== Biography ==
The granddaughter of famed sociologist and philosopher Georg Simmel, she was born into an assimilated Jewish family in Jena, Thuringia, Germany, to doctors Hans Eugen Simmel, a professor, and his wife, Else Rose, a pediatrician. She had younger siblings Eva Barbara, Arnold Georg and Gerhard Friedrich. She immigrated to the United States in March 1940 with her family as a stateless refugee and applied for citizenship later that year. The family was initially divided across New York City; the parents stayed at a lodging house while their children lived at various friends' homes. At age 17, with only an eighth-grade education, she initially lived in Queens, working as a housekeeper for another Jewish family. Nine years later, she received her Ph.D. from Harvard University and later served on the faculty at the College of Medicine at the University of Illinois at Chicago and at Brandeis University.

With Fritz Heider, Simmel co-authored "An Experimental Study of Apparent Behavior," which explored the experience of animacy. The study showed that subjects presented with a certain display of inanimate two-dimensional figures are inclined to ascribe intentions to those figures. This result has been taken to establish "the human instinct for storytelling" and to serve as important data in the study of theory of mind.

In addition to her early work with Heider, Simmel went on to make important contributions in cognitive neuropsychology, for instance in her work on the phenomenon of the phantom limb.

She died in North Eastham, Massachusetts.
