= The Stranger (essay) =

1908 essay by Georg Simmel

"The Stranger" is an essay by Georg Simmel, originally written as an excursus to a chapter dealing with the sociology of space in his book Soziologie. In this essay, Simmel introduced the notion of "the stranger" as a unique sociological category. He differentiates the stranger both from the "outsider" who has no specific relation to a group and from the "wanderer" who comes today and leaves tomorrow. The stranger, he says, comes today and stays tomorrow. The stranger is a member of the group in which he lives and participates and yet remains distant from other – "native" – members of the group.

== Summary ==
In comparison to other forms of social distance and difference (such as class, gender, and even ethnicity) the distance of the stranger has to do with his "origins". The stranger is perceived as extraneous to the group and even though he is in constant relation to other group members; his "distance" is more emphasized than his "nearness". As one subsequent interpreter of the concept put it, the stranger is perceived as being in the group but not of the group.

Simmel's concept of distance comes into play where he identifies a stranger as a person that is far away and close at the same time.

The Stranger is close to us, insofar as we feel between him and ourselves common features of a national, social, occupational, or generally human, nature. He is far from us, insofar as these common features extend beyond him or us, and connect us only because they connect a great many people.

A stranger is far enough away that he is unknown but close enough that it is possible to get to know him. In a society there must be a stranger. If everyone is known then there is no person that is able to bring something new to everybody.

In the excursus, Simmel briefly touches upon the consequences of occupying such a unique position for the stranger as well as the potential effects of the presence of the stranger on other group members. He suggests that because of their peculiar positions in the group, strangers often carry out special tasks that the other members of the group are either incapable or unwilling to carry out. For example, especially in pre-modern societies, most strangers were involved in trade activities. Also, because of their distance from local factions, they were also employed as arbitrators and judges, because they were expected to treat rival factions in society with an impartial attitude.

Objectivity may also be defined as freedom: the objective individual is bound by no commitments which could prejudice his perception, understanding, and evaluation of the given.

On one hand the stranger's opinion does not really matter because of his lack of connection to society, but on the other the stranger's opinion does matter, because of his lack of connection to society. He holds a certain objectivity that allows him to be unbiased and decide freely without fear. He is simply able to see, think, and decide without being influenced by the opinion of others.

The stranger bears a certain objectivity that makes him a valuable member to the individual and society. People let down their inhibitions around him and confess openly without any fear. This is because there is a belief that the Stranger is not connected to anyone significant and therefore does not pose a threat to the confessor's life.

== Reception ==
The concept of the stranger has found relatively wide usage in the subsequent sociological literature and it is utilized by many sociologists ranging from Robert Park to Zygmunt Bauman. Like most widely used sociological concepts, however, there has been some controversy regarding its application and interpretation.
