= Bernard Groethuysen =

French writer and philosopher (1880–1946)

Bernard Groethuysen (also Bernard Groethuisen; born Bernhard Groethuysen; 9 September 1880 – 17 September 1946) was a French writer and philosopher. His works, which transgressed the confines of history and sociology, concern the history of mentalities and representations and the interpretation of the experience of the world. In the interwar period, he made the works of Hölderlin and Kafka and the sociology of Germany available in France.

== Biography ==
Groethuysen was born in Berlin, the second of five children. His mother Olga Groloff was part of a family of Russian immigrants. His father, Philipp Groethuysen, was a Dutch physician with a practice in Berlin. The elder Groethuysen suffered from psychiatric ailments, and after 1885 lived in the sanitorium in Baden-Baden where he died in 1900. It was there that the younger Groethuysen completed his primary and secondary studies.

He went on to study philosophy and history at the University of Vienna, the University of Berlin (where he studied with Georg Simmel), LMU Munich, and then again Berlin. At Berlin, he eventually completed his doctorate in 1903 under Carl Stumpf and also completed his habilitation in 1907 under Wilhelm Dilthey.

Continuing work on Leibniz, Groethuysen went to Paris in autumn 1904 where he met André Gide and Jean Paulhan and encountered Charles Du Bos, whom he had met in Berlin some time before. Returning each year to the French capital, he became a noteworthy "messenger" between German and French cultures. From 1912, he worked closely with Alix Guillain (1876–1951), a Belgian Communist activist. Both settled in Paris in a small artist's studio on rue Campagne-Première. In February 1915, after World War I broke out in France, he was interned in Châteauroux at Bitray, a camp reserved for foreign civilians and located in the premises of the insane asylum of the city. His friends Charles Du Bos, Charles Andler and Henri Bergson, petitioned to improve Groethuysen's conditions of detention, and finally persuaded the authorities to let him reside in private accommodations.

Beginning in 1924, Groethuysen participated each year in the Pontigny Decades held by Paul Desjardins at the Pontigny Abbey where Groethuysen had the opportunity to interact with French intellectuals such as Louis Aragon, Julien Benda, Léon Brunschvicg, François Mauriac, André Maurois, Gabriel Marcel, Roger Martin du Gard and Philippe Soupault. In 1926, he collaborated with Jean Paulhan on the Library of Ideas, a collection published by in Éditions Gallimard that would soon become famous. Appointed professor in Germany in 1931, he fled before the rise of Nazism. He finished his last class with the words: "Intellectuals of all countries, unite!". In 1937, he acquired French citizenship and in 1938 was dismissed in absentia from the German University.

Groethuysen's openness of spirit, his appetite for knowledge and his generosity make him one of the great European intellectuals of the first half of the twentieth century. His translations of Goethe's novels were published by Gallimard. He contributed to the introduction of Kafka in France, writing a preface to Alexander Vialatte's 1946 translation of The Trial. Lucien Herr saw Groethuysen as a "sophist," in the positive sense of the term. Jean Wahl found in Groethuysen a "good European." Pierre Jean Jouve described him as an "extraordinary man." Groethuysen died in 1946 at the Sainte-Élisabeth clinic in Luxembourg City of lung cancer. Jean Paulhan wrote a very personal tribute.

Groethuysen's works focused on the philosophy and politics of the eighteenth century, particularly Montesquieu, Rousseau and the French Revolution. Groethuysen's 1913 treatise on Denis Diderot was particularly influential on the twentieth century reception of the encyclopedist.

== Works ==
Books

- Das Mitgefühl Dissertation (1903).
- La pensée de Diderot (1913).
- Introduction à la pensée philosophique allemande depuis Nietzsche, Paris, Stock, 1926, 127 pages.
- Origines de l'esprit bourgeois en France. I. L'Église et la bourgeoisie, Paris, Gallimard, 1927, 299 pages.
  - English translation: The Bourgeois: Catholicism vs. Capitalism in Eighteenth Century France, translated by Mary Ilford, 1968.
- Philosophische Anthropologie (1928).
- Die Dialektik der Demokratie (1932).
- Mythes et portraits, préface de Jean Paulhan, Paris, Gallimard, 1947.
- Rousseau, Paris, Gallimard, 1949.
- Anthropologie philosophique, Paris, Gallimard, 1953.
- Philosophie de la Révolution française, Paris, Gallimard, 1956.
- Philosophie et histoire, édité par Bernard Dandois, Paris, Albin Michel, 1995.
- Mythes et portraits. Autres portraits, Paris, Gallimard, 1995.

Articles

- Bernard Groethuysen, « A. D. Gurewitsch », Hermès, second series, n. 1, January 1936, pp. 93.
- Bernard Groethuysen, « Avant-propos » pour Maître Eckhart, Hermès, second series, n. 4, July 1937, pp. 5–6.
- Bernard Groethuysen, « Carolus Bovillus », Mesures, vol. 6, n. 1, January 15, 1940, pp. 61–73.
- Bernard Groethuysen, « Montesquieu et l'art de rendre les Hommes libres », Fontaine, n. 56, November 1946, pp. 505–519.
- Bernard Groethuysen, «La pensée de Diderot», La Grande Revue, Paris, n. 82 (1913), pp. 322–341.
