= Concreteness =

Concreteness is an aspect of communication that means being specific, definite, and vivid rather than vague and general. A concrete communication uses specific facts and figures. Concreteness is often taught in college communication courses as one of the aspects of effective communication. Counselors, attorneys, job interviewers, etc. often prod their interviewees to speak with greater concreteness. For instance, if a witness says he gave his wife "a bit of a slap," the cross-examining lawyer might ask how hard he hit her. A job interviewer will often ask probing questions to elicit more concrete information; e.g., "Could you give me an example of when you did XXX?"
