= Bitray =

Coordinates: 46°49′20″N 1°43′54″E

Bitray, some 3 km to the east of Déols in France, was the site of a First World War civilian internment camp. It had around 500 occupants, consisting of nationals of countries then at war with France.

Journalist Georges Batault of the Gazette de Lausanne visited it on 23 April 1915, and reported the presence of 287 men, 193 women, and 180 children. Of those, 323 were Germans and 337 were Austro-Hungarians.

In 1917 it was converted to an American Army hospital.
