= Construal level theory =

Social psychology concept

Construal level theory (CLT) is a theory in social psychology that describes the relation between psychological distance and the extent to which people's thinking (e.g., about objects and events) is abstract or concrete. The core idea of CLT is that the more distant an object is from the individual, the more abstract it will be thought of, while the closer the object is, the more concretely it will be thought of. In CLT, psychological distance is defined on several dimensions—temporal, spatial, social and hypothetical distance being considered most important, though there is some debate among social psychologists about further dimensions like informational, experiential or affective distance. The theory was developed by the Israeli social psychologists Nira Liberman and the American psychologist Yaacov Trope.

An example of construal level effects would be that although planning one's next summer vacation one year in advance (in the distant future) will cause one to focus on broad, decontextualized features of the situation (e.g., anticipating fun and relaxation), the very same vacation planned to occur very soon will cause one to focus on specific features of the present situation (e.g. what restaurants to make reservations for, going for a trip in an off-road vehicle).

According to construal level theory people perceive events that vary in several types of psychological distance:

- temporal distance (time)
- spatial distances (physical space)
- social distances (interpersonal distances, such as distance between two different groups or two dissimilar people)
- hypothetical distances (imagining that an event is likely or unlikely)

Psychological distance affects the extent to which we think about an event, person, or idea as high or low level, and this will influence how concrete or abstract those thoughts are:

- High-level construal is when people think abstractly. When thinking on this level, people are looking at the bigger picture; not focusing on details. At the high level, people focus on central features that capture the overall gist of the situation or object.
- Low-level construal is when people think more concretely and is associated with psychological proximity. When people are engaged in low-level construal, they are focusing on the present in great detail. At the low level, people focus on the peripheral, secondary features that are less essential to the overall gist of the situation or object.

== Levels of construal ==
CLT divides mental construals into two levels: the high-level and the low-level. High-level construals are a way of thinking in a big-picture way. This is a superordinate or central approach, thinking about the overall idea of the situation and extracting the main gist of the situation. Low-level construals are more detail-oriented or subordinate thought processes. For example, one could think about children playing catch in either a high or low level manner. If one were to think about the children's activity at a high level, one might describe this activity as "children having fun". Whereas, if one were to think about the children's activity at a low level, one would focus on more specific, immediate details, such as the color of the ball or the ages of the children. At the low level, more emphasis is placed on how the situation is different from others, whereas at the high level the focus is more on finding how they are similar. Thus which subordinate features one focuses on may depend upon the situation, whereas central, high-level features will not.

Construal level is also related to desirability and feasibility concerns in decision-making. Considering the desirability of an object, event, or course of action puts more importance on the result and is a high-level construal, or way of thinking. Considering the feasibility, on the other hand, is more focused on the means or how to get to the result and is a low-level construal, or way of thinking. That is, the high level focuses more on "why", while the low level focuses more on "how".

== Types of psychological distances ==
According to CLT, psychologically distant events are construed at the high level, while psychologically near events are construed at the low level. There are several different kinds of psychological distance. Temporal distance, spatial distance, social distance, and hypothetical distance are those that have received the most attention in research.

=== Temporal distance ===
Temporal distance refers to distance in time. Something that is temporally near is something that is near in time, whereas something that is temporally distant is far in time. For example, there is greater temporal distance in thinking about a trip that will occur in six months than in thinking about a trip that will occur in one week. Temporal distance to imagined future events modulates our evaluative representation of them such that the greater the distance, the more likely the event is to be conceptualized in terms of a few abstract features. This is relevant in case of potential dangers or risks because this mechanism divorces us cognitively from the reality of likely undesirable outcomes. According to Trope and Liberman, the long history of research on how planning for the near and distant future can be explained by CLT.

==== The planning fallacy ====
The planning fallacy describes how people tend to not consciously think through the future in detail. This leads people to overcommit to different events in the future. They then realize as the events become closer that they cannot possibly complete all of the tasks that they had planned. This can be due to the events overlapping, or not having the time to fully commit to all of their previous plans.

According to CLT, the planning fallacy occurs because events in the distant future are construed at a higher, more abstract level, while events in the near future are construed at a lower, more concrete level. In one study, college students were asked to indicate how many hours they planned to spend on various activities, such as studying, attending classes, exercising, etc. during a week in the near future (next week) or a week in the distant future (a week occurring a few months later). When planning for the near future, students' estimates of how much time they would spend on each activity took into account the fact that time spent on one activity would come at the expense of time spent on another (e.g., time spend exercising might come at the expense of time spent studying). However, when planning for the distant future, students' estimates of how much time they would spend on different activities didn't take these practical limitations into account, and they planned activities as though they had unlimited time and resources. According to the researchers, time constraints and conflicts between activities are factors affecting the feasibility of the activity and are thus low level and more likely to be the focus of near future planning. On the other hand, when the week being planned was in the distant future, desirability concerns (how attractive each activity was), which are high level, were the focus of the students' plans.

==== Time discounting ====
Time discounting or temporal discounting is a wide range of ideas involving the connection between time and the extent to which an object, situation, or course of action is seen as valuable. The overall theory is that people put more value and worth into immediate events and outcomes, and apply less value to future outcomes or events. According to Trope and Liberman, CLT can provide a framework with which to understand the broad array of phenomena described by temporal discounting research. Different construals may differ in the extent to which they are associated with positive or negative evaluations. An abstract, high-level construal of an activity (e.g., "learning to speak French") may lead to a more positive evaluation of that activity than a concrete, low-level construal (e.g., "learning to conjugate the irregular French verb 'avoir'"). Thus, CLT predicts that we will think about the value of the low-level construals when evaluating an event in the near future, but think about the value of the high-level construals when evaluating an event in the distant future. Thus CLT predicts that when low-level construals are more valuable, time delay will discount the attractiveness of an option, but when high-level construals are more valuable, time delay will increase its attractiveness. Thus, the discounting rate is affected and measured by the amount of value placed on the event or outcome. If there is a small reward, it is discounted faster than if the reward were larger.

=== Spatial distance ===
Spatial distance is the physical distance at which the events are taking place from each other. If the event, such as a graduation, is taking place down the street it is being processed on a low level. If the graduation is taking place in another state, then it is processed on a high level. When an event is located far from a person, it is viewed more abstractly. Likewise, when events are at a near location they are viewed more concretely.

In one study, it was found that participants who imagined a spatially distant rather than near event (helping a friend move into an apartment 3,000 miles away from where the participant resided, rather than in the local area) preferred to describe the actions associated with the move in terms of high-level states (e.g., "securing the house") rather than low-level means (e.g., "putting a key in the lock").

=== Social distance ===
Social distance is the measure of space between two or more social groups or individuals. Social distance is more about the feeling of the people within the group and how they interact with other group members. If a social group feels secure and open with another group they would be exhibiting close distance. This can also occur when they feel like the other social groups are similar to their group, therefore seeing the group as an extension of their social group. In this case, a group feels insecure and closed off from groups at far distances. Far distances are when people in a social group feel as if they can't relate to the other group.

Interpersonal similarity is another form of social distance. The more similar someone is to us, the more socially near they seem. Research has shown that an action by someone who is dissimilar to oneself is construed in more abstract terms than an action by someone who is more similar, suggesting that similarity functions as a form of psychological distance.

The area where social distances and spatial difference meet is in language. When people talk about friendships, they often express social distances from their friends with words used to describe spatial distances. The languages used implies that there is physical space between the mental relationships of friends. For example, someone might say of another person "we seem be on opposite sides right now".

=== Hypothetical distance ===
Hypothetical distance is another type of psychological distance described by construal level theory. Hypotheticality refers to the likelihood of an event occurring. A hypothetically near event is one that is highly probable, whereas a hypothetically distant event is one that is highly improbable. The distance in hypothetical distance has to do with how close to reality something is. According to CLT, highly likely events will be processed at a low level construal and highly unlikely events will be processed at a high level construal.

One way to think about something at the higher level is to think of it in terms of broader abstract categories (e.g., clothing), rather than narrow subordinate categories (e.g., mini-skirts). In one study, participants were asked to imagine engaging in an activity, such as going on a camping trip, that was either highly likely or highly unlikely. Participants were then given a list of objects or events that related to that activity (e.g., soap, bathing suit, raft, sneakers, flashlight) and asked to group them into categories. Participants who imagined an unlikely event grouped the items into fewer broader categories than those who imagined a likely event, while those who imagined the likely event used a lower-level construal by focusing on narrower categories.

Optimism plays a role in hypothetical distance. Optimism can affect when people make plans for the future and how many errors occur with the planning process. When people are planning into the distant future, they are planning abstractly and are often optimistic. When people fantasize about future events, they believe that every aspect is going to go according to their plans.

== Perceptions ==
Perceptions are affected by construal level theory in almost all aspects of psychology. Strong relationships and similarities have been found between different types of psychological distances. These include temporal, spatial, personal, and social distance. When distance on one of these levels increases, the other levels also increase. These different types of psychological distance have been found to greatly correlate with one another. This was shown through testing of temporal distance to see if this would also affect the perception of social distance. These were found to have similar results, being that as one level of distance goes up so does the other. So when the time is more distant and associated with another person, this person is thought of as being less like oneself, and thus more distant socially. Therefore, temporal and social distance can increase or decrease familiarity. Also, lack of familiarity (increased social distance) can affect discrimination involving stereotypes, empathy levels, and people's willingness to help this person. Thus, increasing any type of psychological distance can have negative consequences for relationships between socially distant groups or individuals.

CLT can be applied to almost any situation. For example, people thinking in a more distant or high-level construal, will be more open to comprehensive exams which cover a wider overarching idea of the subject, whereas people thinking in lower-level construals or the more near future tend to be more content with a detailed-specific test. In one study, participants viewed a number of partial pictures paired with ideas of either the near or the distant future. When looking at these images, with the idea of the near future, the participants were more able to view the image as a whole concrete image, while they had more abstract interpretations of the distant future images.

=== Judgments ===
People judge all aspects of their lives, including events, people, and society. If an event is close in time, we are more likely to think in terms of concrete low-level construals, making the details more important. If an event is further away, however, we think more in terms of abstract overall ideas that follow high-level construals. When judging how much time it takes to finish a task, participants in a series of studies thought it would take them more time to complete a task when it was further in the future (temporally distant), posed as hypothetical (hypothetically distant) or when they were primed with abstract ideas beforehand. Memories can also be affected by different construal levels and distances. The further in one's past an event occurred the more abstract, high-level thinking occurs. When recalling memories from long ago, an abstract, overall, high-level idea of the event is more likely to be used. When memory of something more recent is recalled, it can be done more concretely with focus on more low-level details.

=== Stereotyping ===
CLT can also be used to explain stereotypes. The abstractness of the representations we have of people or groups can change our judgment of people who do not fit in the same categories as ourselves and are therefore more socially distant. For example, when viewing a different group of people in a more distant or high-level way, one may easily use abstract or centralized views. Viewing a group of teenagers in the mall, an adult may think that they are up to no good, or that they are trouble-makers. This is an overall abstract and centralized view focused only on one broad aspect of the group. These views are usually incorrect, and can lead to stereotypes and discrimination. Similarly, thinking of others on the lower level, such as people that the individual knows personally (i.e., less distant people), allows for more detailed ideas and perceptions of those people. Therefore, these perceptions are often more correct and less likely to create or strengthen stereotypes. The more social distance there is between groups, the more it increases discrimination against groups that are racially or sexually different from ourselves. When people are categorized in such a way that is distinctly different from oneself (that is, psychologically distant from the self) and are thus viewed in more abstract terms, there tend to be more negative effects. Increasing other types of psychological distance (e.g., temporal, spatial) can increase social distance between groups, leading to more of these negative intergroup outcomes.

=== Categorization ===
We form categories depending on the use of the different construal levels. This shapes how we view things as either alike or different. Generally, when we think of objects, situations, or people in abstract, high-level terms, we tend to categorize them into broader categories (e.g., "kitchenware"). When we think in low-level terms, we tend to use narrower more specific subcategories (e.g., "plates", "pots"). Categories can be of different kinds of people where those who are more physically distant or different from ourselves can be categorized as others or out-groups different from ourselves. This can form group bonds, along with attitudes that differ toward out-groups. We can also categorize ourselves, this is often used when people are thinking about their specific qualities, or more of who they are overall. So when thinking about oneself in the present, people tend to be more focused on their individual concrete qualities in more detail, versus when they think of themselves in the future, they think more of how they will be in the years to come in an overall abstract way.

=== Decision-making and risky behavior ===
Distance or high-level construals can make alternative choices that are hard to accomplish more desirable. Near-future or low-level construals can oppositely make alternative choices that are hard to accomplish less desirable. Risky behavior therefore, can be explained by CLT. High level construals can make more difficult or impossible outcomes more attractive and therefore cause people to take greater risks for less likely outcomes. High-level construals can have an effect of valuing rewards that are more risky, and further in the future. For example, people will take riskier bets when the bet is in the distant than the near future. The ideas of time and probability are often thought of in very similar ways; therefore, they tend to correspond, as one increases the other one does as well. The connections between these two are often made automatically, without the conscious knowledge of the individual. When thinking of investments in a high-level construal, people tend to engage in more risk taking behavior. When thinking about the same investment in a low-level construal, there is more focus on the present and what the risk would mean in terms of the here and now. Thus, focusing on the low level aspects of a decision can deter some risk taking behavior by causing one to focus on the actual details, and lessen an overall possible feeling for the future. Across the overall idea of decision making, CLT has been supported for aiding in the help or harm of organizational decision-making processes and outcomes. Research has also examined more common decisions, such as the choice to procrastinate. More concrete activities, or near future events tend to create a more low-level construal, and therefore people are less likely to procrastinate for these functions, than for more abstract activities set further into the future.

=== Interpersonal ===
People tend to view others as either similar or different from oneself. As discussed previously, this corresponds to social distance. If a person is viewed as less similar to oneself, they are thought of as more socially distant and thus at a higher-level construal. If they are seen as more similar to oneself, social distance decreases, resulting in lower-level construals. High level construals can help to create social diversity by making people interested in meeting new and different people. Low-level construals are more helpful to relationships with people who are more similar to us, and aid in sustaining already formed relationships with people in our inner circle and in-group. The frequency of exposure to a certain situation or person can also influence the construal level used. The more often a person has been exposed to an event or person, the more likely it is that they are going to use a lower-level approach to describe them, involving more specific detail learned over time. In contrast, a less familiar event or person would probably be described in a higher level more abstract manner due to the lack of exposure involved. People tend to use these construals to interact with and form an opinion of others. These opinions can often be unconscious or automatic, and thus are not always something that people are aware of doing. People tend to form more of these snap judgments when the person they are judging is more spatially distant. This affects people's opinions on an implicit level, showing how construal levels are an automatic phenomenon. Additionally, at greater psychological distances, people tend give more weight to central traits, rather than peripheral traits when judging another person's character.

=== Social power ===
Power in society can create social distance from others who have either more or less power than oneself. Research has demonstrated that those who are primed with the concept of power tend to construe events in a more abstract, high-level manner. Differing social status can create social distance, and therefore may parallel other forms of psychological distance.

=== Politeness ===
Psychological distance can influence levels of politeness. Higher-level construals and increasing distance increase politeness cues, and lower-level construals or less distant events decrease politeness cues. Even physical distance can be reflective of high and low level construals of politeness. For example, the distance from which people stand from each other when having a conversation, or after initially meeting, can determine the level of politeness displayed. The closer in distance that people stand from each other, the less polite and more informal the meeting is portrayed to be. This can be seen through closer and more intimate relations by hugging or embracing, versus keeping a polite or respectful distance during more formal interactions. Being polite is used in social situations to reflect and control social distance. This has been found cross-culturally, giving more credence to the relationship between construal levels and the level of politeness displayed. Studies have shown that not only does politeness tend to increase with temporal, and spatial distance, along with abstraction, but also oppositely increasing politeness also increases the level of spatial, and temporal distance, along with a higher level of abstraction.

=== Self-regulation/self-control ===
There is a connection between distance and the facilitation of self-regulation or self-control. It has been shown that the future and further distances better facilitate self-regulation, and that as distance to the event decreases, self-regulation decreases as well. When people fear that they will be unable to achieve their goal due to the temptations that can distract them, they choose self-control methods to make decisions and avoid these temptations, thus giving themselves a better chance at attaining their goal. People are more likely to act in this fashion when thinking in a high-level construal.

This high-level thinking can increase the use of certain self-control strategies. Two self-control strategies are choice bracketing and self-imposing punishment. In choice bracketing, through acknowledging detrimental choices and determining a number of positive and helpful substitutes, people can find ways to help aid their self-control. Self-imposed punishments are punishments that people give to themselves for acting on impulsive or detrimental choices, instead of the more self-controlled choices. Because high-level construals support self-control, conceiving of a tempting situation at a higher level promotes the use of both of these strategies and thus can improve self-control.

=== Social conflict, negotiation, and persuasion ===
Negotiations and persuasion are social conflicts that can be understood in terms of CLT. When negotiating or trying to persuade someone, there are often major, high-level, considerations and minor, low-level, considerations. Major issues are aspects such as values, ideology, and overall beliefs. The major issues are often focused on to a greater extent when thinking about the distant future, or with high-level construals. Minor issues are more specific interests that are focused on when thinking about the near future, or low-level construals. CLT and persuasive communications are connected and interrelated in many aspects. When looking at negotiations in relation to high-level construal, there were multiple findings that have shown a difference between the future and the present. When people are more temporally distant or personally distant from an outcome, they are less likely to come to an easy conclusion or compromise over minor objectives. More distance between the present and the time when the negotiations take place makes people more willing to come to a joint conclusion and achieve logrolling agreements that maximize the outcomes of both parties. Lastly, thinking more abstractly about the negotiation in general leads to more compromises and mutually beneficial agreements.

=== Consumer behavior ===
Decision making can be applied to various situations, such as consumer behavior. High and low level construals affect the way people consider purchasing items. When buying items, feasibility (how we can buy the item) which is low-level and desirability (how much we want the item) which is high-level, play a large role in what we buy and why we buy it. This includes the way we view rebates, and the more distance involved to receive the rebate, the less likely the buyer is to pursue the rebate. Low-level construal is also more likely to increase the level of perceived risk and thus increase the likelihood of purchasing insurance or a protection plan. Looking at purchasing something from a further distance (high level construal) highlights the central aspects of the item, often making it seem more positive and satisfactory.

Advertising also uses this as a way to build excitement for an item. For example, cell phone advertisements will neglect to advertise every little detail of their product, but instead only show the newest or most unusual aspect, highlighting the new camera or voice feature, instead of how to turn it on and off. This makes the consumer more likely to purchase the item, by seeing what is advertised to come out in the future. Advertisers may use this strategy to persuade consumers to buy the company's products by highlighting the higher level and more central aspects of the item. Due to construal level effects, promotional message that include a warning of risky side effects (cigarette ads that warn of risks associated with cancer, for example) can ironically increase consumer buying when there is a delay between the time consumers decide whether to choose and the time they expect to consume the product.

Purchasing decisions can also be influenced by physical distance. Being able to touch or see the product in person, versus a more abstract idea of the item can influence potential buyers to be more excited or committed to purchasing the item. These effects of physical distance mirror those of spatial and temporal distance. These aspects of consumer behaviors can be manipulated by the companies by knowing how the consumer thinks, and by changing the level of construal.

=== Regret ===
Regret is also a large aspect of consumer behaviors that is affected by construal level. Regret over one's purchasing choice is experienced differently as distance increases or decreases. When pre-purchasing or preordering an item far in the future the consumer may regret or change their decision in the extended time that they are forced to wait to receive the item. This may also have the opposite effect, however, by strengthening their commitment, and this can occur with the added consistency of advertising, and through constantly being reminded of the positive qualities of the product. Even in events where the purchase is in the present or near future, the first reaction is often regret that later changes toward appreciation of our choices.

=== Creativity ===
Triggering an abstract (high) construal level (e.g., by imagining doing a task next year instead of today) improves performance on several different measures of creativity. When viewing a task through a high-construal processing frame, people arrive at creative insight ('aha moments') more often, and generate more creative reasons for why something should be done.

=== Additional types of distance associated with consumer behavior ===
Additional types of psychological distance, aside from those traditionally discussed as part of CLT, have been proposed to explain consumer decisions. Experiential distance is the extent to which the consumer has obtained information based on first-hand, direct experience, or on indirect experiences, such as from other people or the media. Informational distance is defined in terms of how much information or knowledge someone has about a product. The more information one has about the product, the less distant it is.

== See also ==
- Construals
- Objectification
- Dehumanization
- Not In My Backyard
