= Georg Simmel =

German sociologist and philosopher (1858–1918)

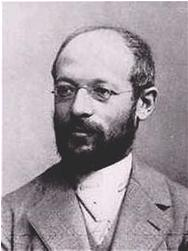
- Born: 1 March 1858; Berlin, Kingdom of Prussia
- Died: 26 September 1918 (aged 60); Strassburg, German Empire
- Spouse: Gertrud Kinel
- Children: 2
- Relatives: Marianne Simmel (granddaughter)

Education
- Education: University of Berlin (PhD, 1881)
- Academic advisor: Eduard Zeller

Philosophical work
- Era: 19th-century philosophy
- Region: Western philosophy
- School: Neo-Kantianism; Lebensphilosophie
- Institutions: University of Berlin; University of Strasbourg
- Notable students: Walter Benjamin, Bernard Groethuysen, Gertrud Kantorowicz, György Lukács, Robert E. Park, Max Scheler, Margarete Susman
- Main interests: Sociology; philosophy of culture; social philosophy; philosophy of history
- Notable ideas: Formal sociology (social forms), the tragedy of culture, web of group affiliation, triadic closure

Georg Simmel (/ˈzɪməl/; German: [ˈzɪml̩]; 1 March 1858 – 26 October 1918) was a German sociologist, philosopher, and critic. A founding figure of sociology, his neo-Kantian approach helped establish sociological antipositivism, asking "What is society?" in analogy to Kant's "What is nature?". He pioneered analyses of individuality and social fragmentation.

Simmel discussed social and cultural phenomena in terms of "forms" and "contents" with a transient relationship, wherein form becomes content, and vice versa dependent on context. In this sense, Simmel was a forerunner to structuralist styles of reasoning in the social sciences and heralded relational sociology.

In "The Metropolis and Mental Life", Simmel anticipates urban sociology, symbolic interactionism, and social network analysis. An acquaintance of Max Weber, Simmel wrote on the topic of personal character in a manner reminiscent of the sociological ideal type. He broadly rejected academic standards, however, philosophically covering topics such as emotion and romantic love. Both Simmel and Weber's nonpositivist theory informed the eclectic critical theory of the Frankfurt School.

== Biography ==
=== Early life and education ===
Georg Simmel was born in Berlin, Germany, as the youngest of seven children to an assimilated Jewish family. His father, Eduard Simmel (1810–1874), a prosperous businessman and convert to Roman Catholicism, had founded a confectionery store called "Felix & Sarotti" that would later be taken over by a chocolate manufacturer. His mother Flora Bodstein (1818–1897) came from a Jewish family who had converted to Lutheranism. Georg, himself, was baptized as a Protestant when he was a child.

His father died in 1874, when Georg was 16, leaving a sizable inheritance. Georg was then adopted by Julius Friedländer, the founder of an international music publishing house known as Peters Verlag, who endowed him with the large fortune that enabled him to become a scholar.

Beginning in 1876, Simmel studied philosophy and history at the Humboldt University of Berlin, receiving his doctorate in 1881 for his thesis on Kantian philosophy of matter, titled "Das Wesen der Materie nach Kants Physischer Monadologie" ("The Nature of Matter According to Kant's Physical Monadology").

In 1885, Simmel became a privatdozent at the University of Berlin, officially lecturing in philosophy but also in ethics, logic, pessimism, art, psychology and sociology. His lectures were popular inside the university and attracted the intellectual elite of Berlin as well. Although his applications for vacant chairs at German universities were supported by Max Weber, Simmel remained an academic outsider. However, with the support of an inheritance from his guardian, he was able to pursue his scholarly interests for many years without needing a salaried position.

Simmel had a hard time gaining acceptance in the academic community despite the support of well-known associates, such as Max Weber, Rainer Maria Rilke, Stefan George and Edmund Husserl. This was partly because of anti-Semitism, but also simply because his articles were written for a general audience rather than academic sociologists. This led to dismissive judgements from other professionals. Simmel nevertheless continued his intellectual and academic work, as well as taking part in artistic circles.

=== Later life ===
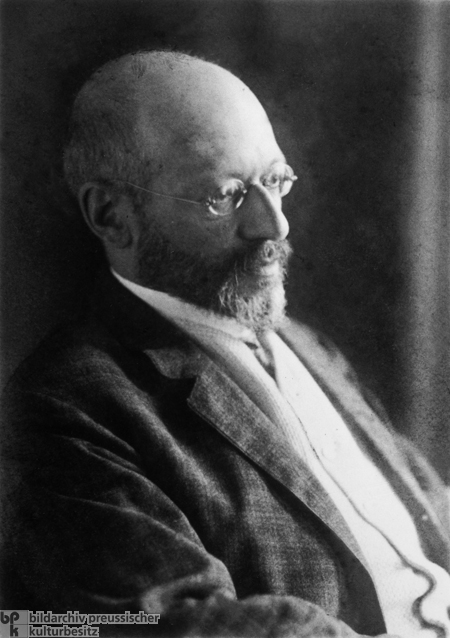
Simmel in 1914

In 1890, Georg married Gertrud Kinel, a philosopher who published both under the pseudonym Marie-Luise Enckendorf and her own name. They lived a sheltered and bourgeois life, their home becoming a venue for cultivated gatherings in the tradition of the salon. They had one son, Hans Eugen Simmel, who became a medical doctor. Their granddaughter was the psychologist Marianne Simmel. Simmel also had a secret affair with his assistant Gertrud Kantorowicz, who bore him a daughter in 1907, but this was hidden until after Simmel's death.

In 1909, Simmel, Ferdinand Tönnies, Max Weber, and others, co-founded the German Society for Sociology. He served as a member of its first executive body. In 1914, Simmel received an ordinary professorship with chair, at the then-German University of Strassburg, but did not feel at home there. Because World War I broke out, all academic activities and lectures were halted and lecture halls were converted to military hospitals. In 1915 he unsuccessfully applied for a chair at Heidelberg University. In 1917, Simmel stopped reading the newspapers and withdrew to the Black Forest to finish the book The View of Life (Lebensanschauung). Shortly before the end of the war in 1918, he died from liver cancer in Strasbourg.

== Theory ==
There are four basic levels of concern in Simmel's work:

1. The psychological workings of social life
2. The sociological workings of interpersonal relationships.
3. The structure of and changes in zeitgeist (i.e. the social and cultural "spirit") of his time. He would also adopt the principle of emergentism, the idea that higher levels of conscious properties emerge from lower levels.
4. The nature and inevitable fate of humanity.

=== Dialectical method ===
A dialectical approach is a multicausal and multidirectional method: it focuses on social relations; integrates facts and value, rejecting the idea that there are absolute dividing lines between social phenomena; looks not only at the present, but also at the past and future; and is deeply concerned with both conflicts and contradictions. Simmel's sociology was concerned with relationships—especially interaction—and was thus known as a methodological relationalist (in sociology). This approach is based on the idea that interactions exist between everything. Overall, Simmel would be mostly interested in dualisms, conflicts, and contradictions in whatever realm of the social world he worked on.

=== Forms of association ===
The furthest Simmel has brought his work to a micro-level analysis was in dealing with forms and interactions that takes place with different types of people. Such forms would include subordination, superordination, exchange, conflict and sociability.

Simmel focused on these forms of association while paying little attention to individual consciousness. Simmel believed in the creative consciousness that can be found in diverse forms of interaction, which he observed both the ability of actors to create social structures, as well as the disastrous effects such structures had on the creativity of individuals. Simmel also believed that social and cultural structures come to have a life of their own.

==== Sociability ====
Simmel refers to "all the forms of association by which a mere sum of separate individuals are made into a 'society'," whereby society is defined as a "higher unity," composed of individuals.

Simmel was particularly fascinated by humanity's "impulse to sociability," whereby "the solitariness of the individuals is resolved into togetherness," referring to this unity as "the free-playing, interacting interdependence of individuals." Accordingly, he defines sociability as "the play-form of association" driven by "amicability, breeding, cordiality and attractiveness of all kinds." In order for this free association to occur, Simmel explains, "the personalities must not emphasize themselves too individually ... with too much abandon and aggressiveness." Rather, "this world of sociability ... a democracy of equals" is to be without friction so long as people blend together in the spirit of pleasure and bringing "about among themselves a pure interaction free of any disturbing material accent."

Simmel describes idealised interactions in expressing that "the vitality of real individuals, in their sensitivities and attractions, in the fullness of their impulses and convictions...is but a symbol of life, as it shows itself in the flow of a lightly amusing play," adding that "a symbolic play, in whose aesthetic charm all the finest and most highly sublimated dynamics of social existence and its riches are gathered."

=== Social geometry ===
In a dyad (i.e. a two-person group), a person is able to retain their individuality as there is no fear that another may shift the balance of the group. In contrast, triads (i.e. three-person groups) risk the potential of one member becoming subordinate to the other two, thus threatening their individuality. Furthermore, were a triad to lose a member, it would become a dyad.

The basic nature of this dyad-triad principle forms the essence of structures that form society. As a group (structure) increases in size, it becomes more isolated and segmented, whereby the individual also becomes further separated from each member. In respect to the notion of "group size", Simmel's view was somewhat ambiguous. On one hand, he believed that the individual benefits most when a group gets bigger and exerting control on the individual becomes harder. On the other hand, with a large group there is a possibility of the individual's becoming distant and impersonal. Therefore, in an effort for the individual to cope with the larger group they must become a part of a smaller group such as the family.

The value of something is determined by the distance from its actor. In "The Stranger", Simmel discusses how if a person is too close to the actor they are not considered a stranger. If they are too far, however, they would no longer be a part of a group. The particular distance from a group allows a person to have objective relationships with different group members.

== Views ==
=== The Metropolis and Mental Life ===
One of Simmel's most notable essays is "The Metropolis and Mental Life" ("Die Großstädte und das Geistesleben") from 1903, which was originally given as one of a series of lectures on all aspects of city life by experts in various fields, ranging from science and religion to art. The series was conducted alongside the Dresden cities exhibition of 1903. Simmel was originally asked to lecture on the role of intellectual (or scholarly) life in the big city, but he effectively reversed the topic in order to analyze the effects of the big city on the mind of the individual. As a result, when the lectures were published as essays in a book, to fill the gap, the series editor himself had to supply an essay on the original topic.

"The Metropolis and Mental Life" was not well received during Simmel's lifetime. The organisers of the exhibition overemphasised its negative comments about city life, but Simmel also pointed out positive transformations. During the 1920s the essay influenced the thought of Robert E. Park and other American sociologists at the University of Chicago who collectively became known as the "Chicago School". It gained wider circulation in the 1950s when it was translated into English and published as part of Kurt Wolff's edited collection, The Sociology of Georg Simmel. It now appears regularly on the reading lists of courses in urban studies and architectural history. However, the notion of the blasé is actually not the central or final point of the essay, but is part of a description of a sequence of states in an irreversible transformation of the mind. In other words, Simmel does not quite say that the big city has an overall negative effect on the mind or the self, even as he suggests that it undergoes permanent changes. It is perhaps this ambiguity that gave the essay a lasting place in the discourse on the metropolis.

The deepest problems of modern life flow from the attempt of the individual to maintain the independence and individuality of his existence against the sovereign powers of society, against the weight of the historical heritage and the external culture and technique of life. The antagonism represents the most modern form of the conflict which primitive man must carry on with nature for his own bodily existence. The eighteenth century may have called for liberation from all the ties which grew up historically in politics, in religion, in morality and in economics in order to permit the original natural virtue of man, which is equal in everyone, to develop without inhibition; the nineteenth century may have sought to promote, in addition to man's freedom, his individuality (which is connected with the division of labour) and his achievements which make him unique and indispensable but which at the same time make him so much the more dependent on the complementary activity of others; Nietzsche may have seen the relentless struggle of the individual as the prerequisite for his full development, while socialism found the same thing in the suppression of all competition – but in each of these the same fundamental motive was at work, namely the resistance of the individual to being levelled, swallowed up in the social-technological mechanism.

— Georg Simmel, The Metropolis and Mental Life (1903)

=== The Philosophy of Money ===
In The Philosophy of Money, Simmel views money as a component of life which helped people understand the totality of life. Simmel believed people created value by making objects, then separating themselves from that object and then trying to overcome that distance. He found that things which were too close were not considered valuable and things which were too far for people to get were also not considered valuable. Considered in determining value was the scarcity, time, sacrifice, and difficulties involved in getting the object.

For Simmel, city life led to a division of labor and increased financialisation. As financial transactions increase, some emphasis shifts to what the individual can do, instead of who the individual is. Financial matters in addition to emotions are in play.

=== "The Stranger" ===
Simmel's concept of distance comes into play where he identifies a stranger as a person that is far away and close at the same time.

The Stranger is close to us, insofar as we feel between him and ourselves common features of a national, social, occupational, or generally human, nature. He is far from us, insofar as these common features extend beyond him or us, and connect us only because they connect a great many people.

— Georg Simmel, "The Stranger" (1908)

A stranger is far enough away that he is unknown but close enough that it is possible to get to know him. In a society there must be a stranger. If everyone is known then there is no person that is able to bring something new to everybody.

The stranger bears a certain objectivity that makes him a valuable member to the individual and society. People let down their inhibitions around him and confess openly without any fear. This is because there is a belief that the Stranger is not connected to anyone significant and therefore does not pose a threat to the confessor's life.

More generally, Simmel observes that because of their peculiar position in the group, strangers often carry out special tasks that the other members of the group are either incapable or unwilling to carry out. For example, especially in pre-modern societies, most strangers made a living from trade, which was often viewed as an unpleasant activity by "native" members of those societies. In some societies, they were also employed as arbitrators and judges, because they were expected to treat rival factions in society with an impartial attitude.

Objectivity may also be defined as freedom: the objective individual is bound by no commitments which could prejudice his perception, understanding, and evaluation of the given.

— Georg Simmel, "The Stranger" (1908)

On one hand the stranger's opinion does not really matter because of his lack of connection to society, but on the other the stranger's opinion does matter, because of his lack of connection to society. He holds a certain objectivity that allows him to be unbiased and decide freely without fear. He is simply able to see, think, and decide without being influenced by the opinion of others.

=== On secrecy ===
According to Simmel, in small groups, secrets are less needed because everyone seems to be more similar. In larger groups secrets are needed as a result of their heterogeneity. In secret societies, groups are held together by the need to maintain the secret, a condition that also causes tension because the society relies on its sense of secrecy and exclusion. For Simmel, secrecy also exists in relationships as intimate as marriage. In revealing all, marriage becomes dull and boring and loses all excitement. Simmel saw a general thread in the importance of secrets and the strategic use of ignorance: To be social beings who are able to cope successfully with their social environment, people need clearly defined realms of unknowns for themselves. Furthermore, sharing a common secret produces a strong "we feeling." The modern world depends on honesty and therefore a lie can be considered more devastating than it ever has been before. Money allows a level of secrecy that has never been attainable before, because money allows for "invisible" transactions, due to the fact that money is now an integral part of human values and beliefs. It is possible to buy silence.

=== On flirtation ===
In a series of essays published in 1923, Simmel discusses flirtation as a generalized type of social interaction. According to Simmel, "to define flirtation as simply a 'passion for pleasing' is to confuse the means to an end with the desire for this end." The distinctiveness of the flirt lies in the fact that she awakens delight and desire by means of a unique antithesis and synthesis: through the alternation of accommodation and denial. In the behavior of the flirt, the man feels the proximity and interpenetration of the ability and inability to acquire something. This is in essence the "price." A sidelong glance with the head half-turned is characteristic of flirtation in its most banal guise.

=== On fashion ===
In Simmel's view, fashion is a form of social relationship that allows those who wish to conform to the demands of a group to do so. It also allows some to be individualistic by deviating from the norm. There are many social roles in fashion and both objective culture and individual culture can influence people. In the initial stage, everyone adopts what is fashionable and those that deviate from the fashion inevitably adopt a whole new view of what they consider fashion. Ritzer wrote:

Simmel argued that not only does following what is in fashion involve dualities so does the effort on the part of some people to be of fashion. Unfashionable people view those who follow a fashion as being imitators and themselves as mavericks, but Simmel argued that the latter are simply engaging in an inverse form of imitation.

— George Ritzer, "Georg Simmel", Modern Sociological Theory (2008)

This means that those who are trying to be different or "unique", are not, because in trying to be different they become a part of a new group that has labeled themselves different or "unique".

== Aesthetics and cultural history ==
Simmel's work on European art history spans the Middle Ages to the early 20th century, including books on Johann Wolfgang von Goethe and Rembrandt and essays on artists from Michelangelo and Leonardo da Vinci to Auguste Rodin. He also wrote on art forms and media, aesthetics after Immanuel Kant and Arthur Schopenhauer, and the sociology of art in modern culture. These are important to Simmel's view of society's modern forms. He used symbols, metaphors, tropes, and analogies exploring structures of mind and behaviour. From 1901 he planned an unrealised volume integrating his philosophy of art, which he told philosopher Heinrich Rickert was a "burning" and "dominant interest". He asked Kantorowicz to edit his unpublished manuscripts posthumously. Suhrkamp Verlag issued many unknown texts in a 1989–2014 Gesamtausgabe (collected works).

== Works ==
Simmel's major monographic works include, in chronological order:

- Über sociale Differenzierung (1890). Leipzig: Duncker & Humblot [On Social Differentiation]
- Einleitung in die Moralwissenschaft 1 & 2 (1892–1893). Berlin: Hertz [Introduction to the Science of Ethics]
- Die Probleme der Geschichtphilosophie (1892). Leipzig: Duncker & Humblot. (2nd ed., 1905) [The Problems of the Philosophy of History]
- Philosophie des Geldes (1900). Leipzig: Duncker & Humblot (2nd ed., 1907) [The Philosophy of Money]
- Die Großstädte und das Geistesleben (1903). Dresden: Petermann. [The Metropolis and Mental Life]
- Kant (1904). Leipzig: Duncker & Humblot. (6th ed., 1924)
- Philosophie der Mode (1905). Berlin: Pan-Verlag.
- Kant und Goethe (1906). Berlin: Marquardt.
- Die Religion (1906). Frankfurt am Main: Rütten & Loening. (2nd ed., 1912).
- Schopenhauer und Nietzsche (1907). Leipzig: Duncker & Humblot.
- Soziologie (1908). Leipzig: Duncker & Humblot. [Sociology: inquiries into the construction of social forms]
- Hauptprobleme der Philosophie (1910). Leipzig: Göschen.
- Philosophische Kultur (1911) Leipzig: Kröner. (2nd ed., 1919).
- Goethe (1913). Leipzig: Klinkhardt.
- Rembrandt (1916) Leipzig: Wolff.
- Grundfragen der Soziologie (1917) Berlin: Göschen. [Fundamental Questions of Sociology]
- Lebensanschauung (1918). München: Duncker & Humblot. [The View of Life]
- Zur Philosophie der Kunst (1922). Potsdam: Kiepenheur.
- Fragmente und Aufsäze aus dem Nachlass (1923), edited by G. Kantorowicz. München: Drei Masken Verlag.
- Brücke und Tür (1957), edited by M. Landmann & M. Susman. Stuttgart: Koehler.

Works in periodicals

- "Alpenreisen." Die Zeit, Wiener Wochenschrift für Politik, Vollwirtschaft, Wissenschaft und Kunst [weekly newspaper] (13 June 1895)
- "Rom, eine ästhetische Analyse." Die Zeit, Wiener Wochenschrift für Politik, Vollwirtschaft, Wissenschaft und Kunst (28 May 1898).
- "Florenz." Der Tag [magazine] (2 March 1906).
- "Venedig." Der Kunstwart, Halbmonatsschau über Dichtung, Theater, Musik, bildende und angewandte Kunst [magazine] (June 1907).
- "Der Begriff und die Tragödie der Kultur" ["The Concept and Tragedy of Culture"]. Logos. Internationale Zeitschrift für Philosophie der Kultur 2 (1911–1912): 1–25.

== See also ==
- Definitions of philosophy
- Form and content
- Karl Mannheim
