= Gertrud Kantorowicz =

German art historian, poet and translator

Gertrud Kantorowicz (9 October 1876 — 19 or 20 April 1945) was a German art historian, poet and translator.

== Life ==
Gertrud Kantorowicz was born 1876 in Poznań. She studied at the University of Berlin, the LMU Munich, and the University of Zurich, where she received her doctorate in art history in 1903, supervised by Johann Rudolf Rahn, becoming one of the first women in Germany to obtain a humanities PhD. She met Stefan George in 1898, becoming the only woman to publish in his literary magazine Blätter für die Kunst ("Journal for the Arts"), and staying in close touch until 1914. Kantorowicz also became a disciple and assistant to Georg Simmel, and his secret lover. In 1907 she bore Simmel a daughter, a fact hidden until after Simmel's death in 1918. Before the First World War she published a study on 15th century Sienese art, and a German translation of Henri Bergson's Creative Evolution.

In the mid-1920s she re-established contact with George. However, her work on the conceptual foundations of classical Greek art was only published posthumously. Although she was in England in 1938, she chose to return to Germany during the Czechoslovak crisis. After the outbreak of war, she managed to arrange a post at Skidmore College in the United States, but could not manage to leave Germany legally. Along with her aunt, the mother of Ernst Kantorowicz, she unsuccessfully tried to flee by crossing the border to Switzerland near Bregenz, was apprehended and sent to the Theresienstadt concentration camp. She died there in April 1945.

== Works ==
- (ed.) Fragmente und Aufsätze: aus dem Nachlass und Veröffentlichungen der letzten Jahre [Fragments and essays: from notebooks and publications of recent years] by Georg Simmel
- Vom Wesen der griechischen Kunst [On the nature of Greek art], 1961. Translated into English by J. L. Benson as The inner nature of Greek art, 1992
- Lyrik: kritische Ausgabe [Lyrics: critical edition], ed. Philipp Redl, 2010.
