= Third-person effect =

Hypothesis in social sciences related to the perception of media effects

The third-person effect hypothesis predicts that people tend to perceive that mass media messages have a greater effect on others than on themselves, based on personal biases. The third-person effect manifests itself through an individual's overestimation of the effect of a mass communicated message on the generalized other, or an underestimation of the effect of a mass communicated message on themselves.

These types of perceptions stem from a self-motivated social desirability (not feeling influenced by mass messages promotes self-esteem), a social-distance corollary (choosing to dissociate oneself from others who may be influenced), and a perceived exposure to a message (others choose to be influenced by persuasive communication). Other names for the effect are "Third-person perception" and "Web Third-person effect." From 2015, the effect is named "Web Third-person effect" when it is verified in social media, media websites, blogs and in websites in general.

== History ==
Sociologist W. Phillips Davison, who first articulated the third-person effect hypothesis in 1983, explains that the phenomenon first piqued his interest in 1949 or 1950, when he learned of Japan's attempt during World War II to dissuade black U.S. soldiers from fighting at Iwo Jima using propaganda in the form of leaflets. As Davison recounts, the leaflets stressed that the Japanese did not have a quarrel with the black soldiers, and therefore they should give up or desert. Although there was no indication that the leaflets had any effect on the soldiers, the incident preceded a substantial reshuffle among the officers and the unit was withdrawn the next day.

Several years later, when interviewing West German journalists to determine the influence of the press on foreign policy, Davison asked the journalists to estimate the influence editorials had on readers. Although no evidence could be found to support their claims, Davison writes that a common response was, “The editorials have little effect on people like you and me, but the ordinary reader is likely to be influenced quite a lot.”

In both anecdotes, the parties that evaluated the impact of the communication estimated a larger media effect on others than on themselves. These and other experiences led Davison to articulate what he called the third-person effect hypothesis, which predicts:

“people will tend to overestimate the influence that mass communications have on the attitudes and behavior of others. More specifically, individuals who are members of an audience that is exposed to a persuasive communication (whether or not this communication is intended to be persuasive) will expect the communication to have a greater effect on others than on themselves. And whether or not these individuals are among the ostensible audience for the message, the impact that they expect this communication to have on others may lead them to take some action. Any effect that the communication achieves may thus be due not to the reaction of the ostensible audience but rather to the behavior of those who anticipate, or think they perceive, some reaction on the part of others.” (p. 3).

A year before Davison published his article about third person effects, University of Georgia researchers Leonard Reid and Lawrence Soley published an article demonstrating the applicability of third person effects to advertising, although the researchers did not use the phrase “third person effects” to describe their findings. Reid and Soley presented 222 randomly selected survey respondents with a list of statements about advertising’s social (e.g., “advertising misleads and deceives people (me)") and economic (e.g., “advertising results in lower prices for products that people (I) buy”) effects, which were evaluated on Likert-type scales ranging from “strongly agree” to “strongly disagree.” One-half (i.e., 111) of the subjects evaluated each statement using either the “me” or “people” version of the statement, which were randomly ordered in the questionnaire. The results showed that the respondents perceived advertising as having a greater social effect on others than themselves, but less economic effects on themselves than on others. The results suggested that respondents perceived advertising to be a greater influence on others than on themselves, but that the respondents received fewer positive economic benefits from advertising than did others.

In a case study conducted by Douglas McLeod et al. (1997), the third-person effect was analyzed via participants’ perceptions of being influenced by violent or misogynistic lyrics from rap music. The sample participants were divided up into three groups: one listened to violent rap music, another heard misogynistic rap music, and the third group was the control group. All lyrics heard were from actual, recorded songs. The study asked subjects to estimate the effects of listening to these types of lyrics on someone's behaviors, knowledge, and attitudes. They were also asked how these lyrics would affect themselves, students at their university, youth in New York or Los Angeles, and the average person. The study found that students considered the rap lyrics to be least influential on themselves and more influential on youths in New York or Los Angeles. People are more likely to assume everyone else is more easily influenced by messages than themselves. Furthermore, a recent study conducted by Nikos Antonopoulos et al. (2015) found characteristics of what users observe when visiting a media website as well as a prediction model. The influence that this information has over their opinion verifies the existence of Web Third-person effect (WTPE). With the use of an online survey (N = 9150) in all media websites (radio station, television station, portal, newspaper and email-social media), it was proved that the variables that have a greater impact either on others or our friends than ourselves are: the number of users being concurrently online on the same media website, the exact number of users having read each article on a media website as well as the number of users having shared a news article on Facebook, Twitter, or other social networks. Moreover, age is a significant factor that explains the findings and is important to the effect. Additionally, factors that affect the influence of the user generated messages on others than on oneself were found. Furthermore, when the more credible the news is perceived to be and when there is not a particular mediated message, the WTPE is absent confirming the existing theory.

== Initial support ==
To support the third-person effect hypothesis, Davison (1983) conducted four minor and informal surveys. Each survey asked between 25 and 35 participants to estimate the influence of persuasive communication on themselves and others. Participants estimated self-other effects for (1) a campaign theme on gubernatorial vote choice, (2) television advertising on children, (3) the results of early presidential primaries on vote choice, and (4) campaign messages on presidential vote choice. On average they estimated (1) other New York voters were more influenced by campaign themes than they were personally, (2) other children were more influenced by television advertising than they had been personally, (3) others were more influenced by the results of early presidential primaries than they were personally, and (4) others were more influenced by campaign advertisements than they were personally. Although the surveys were informal, they support the hypothesis.

== Methodological artifact theory ==
Price and Tewksbury tested whether the third-person effect was a methodological artifact as a result of asking participants self-other questions in close proximity. Using a three-condition experiment in which they asked participants in the first condition self-only questions, participants in the second condition other-only questions, and participants in the third condition self and other questions, Price and Tewksbury's results indicate consistent estimates of self and other estimates across conditions. These results, then, indicate the effect is not the result of a methodological artifact.

== Major factors ==
According to Perloff (1999, 2009), two major factors facilitate the third-person effect: judgments of message desirability and perceived social distance (social distance corollary). In their meta-analysis of studies of third-person perception Sun, Pan, and Shen (2008) found that message desirability is the most important moderator of third-person perception. Third-person effects are particularly pronounced when the message is perceived as undesirable—that is, when people infer that “this message may not be so good for me” or “it’s not cool to admit you’re influenced by this media program.” In line with these predictions, people have been found to perceive content that is typically thought to be antisocial to have a larger impact on others than on themselves (e.g., television violence, pornography, antisocial rap music). Indeed, many researchers have found evidence that undesirable messages, such as violent and hateful messages, yield a greater third-person effect.

On the other hand, when messages are perceived as desirable, people are not so likely to exhibit a third-person effect. According to Perloff (2009), the first-person effect, or reversed third-person effect, is more common for desirable messages and seems to emerge when agreement with the message reflects positively on the self and to some degree when the message touches on topics that are congruent with the orientation of groups with which individuals identify. According to the self-enhancement view, if the third-person effect is driven by a desire to preserve self-esteem, people should be willing to acknowledge effects for communications that are regarded as socially desirable, healthy, or otherwise good for the self. Undergraduates perceived that others will be more influenced than themselves by cigarette ads but they will be more affected by anti-tobacco and drunk-driving PSAs.

Another factor that influences the magnitude of the third-person effect is perceived social distance between self and comparison others. In the “social distance corollary,” the disparity of self and other is increased as perceived distance between self and comparison others is increased. Assumed in social distance, is that people are more likely to think that someone will have a similar response to themselves if they share characteristics such as where they live, political affiliations and age. Although social distance is not a necessary condition for the third-person effect to occur, increasing the social distance makes the third-person effect larger. In their meta-analysis, Andsager and White (2007) concluded that “Research consistently finds that others who are anchored to self as a point of reference are perceived to be less influenced by persuasive messages than are others who are not defined and, therefore, not anchored to any point of reference at all” (p. 92).

== Psychological underpinnings ==
Perloff notes that the majority of third-person effect studies attribute the psychological underpinnings of the effect to either attribution theory or biased optimism.

Attribution theory predicts that actors tend to attribute their actions to situational factors while observers tend to attribute the same actions to dispositional factors. For example, attribution theory predicts that a student who turns in a late assignment may explain to the professor that the tardiness is uncharacteristic and due to a situational factor like an unusual computer problem while the professor might believe the tardiness was due instead to a dispositional factor like the student's laziness. In the context of the third-person effect hypothesis, then, attribution theory explains why a person may think that he or she understands the underlying persuasive aspects of the message while others’ dispositional flaws prevent them from perceiving those same aspects.

Biased optimism predicts that people tend to judge themselves as less likely than others to experience negative consequences and, conversely, that people tend to judge themselves as more likely than others to experience positive events. In the context of the third-person effect hypothesis, biased optimism explains why people judge themselves as being less likely than others to be affected by persuasion.

== Perceptual component meta-analytic support ==
In a critical review and synthesis of the third-person effect hypothesis, Perloff (1999) noted that of the 45 published articles that had tested the phenomenon by 1999, all had found support for the perceptual component of the hypothesis.

One year later, Paul, Salwen, and Dupagne conducted a meta-analysis of 32 empirical analyses that tested the perceptual component of the third-person effect hypothesis. Their results indicate the perceptual component of the third-person effect hypothesis received robust support (r = .50), especially compared to meta-analyses of other media effects theories.

Paul, Salwen, and Dupagne (2000) also found three significant moderators of the perceptual component of the third-person effect hypothesis: (1) sampling – samples obtained from nonrandom samples yielded greater third-person effect differences than samples obtained from random samples; (2) respondent – samples obtained from student samples yielded greater third-person effect differences than samples obtained from non-student samples; and (3) message – different types of content (e.g., general media messages, pornography, television violence, commercial advertisements, political content, nonpolitical news, etc.) have differing effects on the size of the obtained third-person perceptions.

== Behavioral component support ==
Multiple studies have found support for the behavioral component of the third-person effect hypothesis. Possibly because Davison noted that censors seldom admit to have been adversely affected by the information they proscribe, scholars who have found support for the behavioral component have generally operationalized behavior as a willingness to censor content to stop the content from having the perceived negative persuasive impact on others.

Specifically, scholars have demonstrated that third-person perception predicts willingness to censor pornography, sexual and violent television content, cigarette, beer, liquor, and gambling advertising, rap music and the number of users being concurrently online on the same media website, the exact number of users having read each article on a media website as well as the number of users having shared a news article on Facebook, Twitter, or other social networks.

Conversely, third-person perception does not predict willingness to censor news or political media content. Studies have looked at examples including censorship of press coverage of a high-profile murder trial, support for an independent commission to regulate political communication, and censorship for a Holocaust-denial advertisement.

== First-person effect ==
Scholars have noted that in some situations, people don't always estimate greater media effects for others than for themselves. Indeed, in certain situations people tend to estimate greater media effects on themselves than on others, and in other situations people tend to estimate similar media effects on self and others.

=== First person perception ===
First person effects – the estimation of greater media effects on self than others – tends to happen in situations in which people judge it desirable to be influenced by the media message. Innes and Zeitz first documented this phenomenon in 1988 when they noticed that participants exposed to content with a violent message exhibited traditional third-person effects while those exposed to a public service announcement exhibited the reverse. They described this reverse effect, however, only as “something akin to a third person effect” (p.461).

Several years later, Cohen and Davis, who found that people tended to overestimate the effect of attack advertisements for disliked candidates on themselves than on others, coined the term “reverse third-person effect” (p.687). The same year, Tiedge, Silverblatt, Havice, and Rosenfeld coined the term “first-person effect” to refer to the perceived effects of media on self as being more than on others.

Finally, Gunther & Thorson, in a study that paved the way for extension of the third-person effect hypothesis, demonstrated empirically that the social desirability of the message tended to affect whether participants were likely to exhibit third- or first- person effects. Socially desirable messages, Gunther and Thorson argue, tend to produce first-person effects while messages that are not perceived as desirable to be influenced by tend to produce traditional third-person effects.

=== First person behavioral effects ===
Only a handful of studies have, intentionally or unintentionally, examined the behavioral component of the first-person effect. Of these, only one has specifically examined a relationship between first-person perceptions and behavioral consequences. Day examined the relationship between first-person effects from socially desirable issue advertisements and the likelihood of voting for legislation supporting the issue. Day found a significant relationship between first-person perceptions of the advertisement and the reported likelihood of voting for the legislation.
