= Psychological distance =

Concept in psychology

Psychological distance is the degree to which people feel removed from a phenomenon. Distance in this case is not limited to the physical surroundings, rather it could also be abstract. Distance can be defined as the separation between the self and other instances like persons, events, knowledge, or time. Psychological distance was first defined in Trope and Liberman's Construal Level Theory (CLT). However, Trope and Liberman only identified temporal distance as a separator. This has since been revised to include four categories of distance: spatial, social, hypothetical, and informational distances. Further studies have concluded that all four are strongly and systemically correlated with each other.

At a basic level, psychological distance in Construal Level Theory notes that distance plays a pivotal role in the relationship between an event and a person. The distance factor will help determine the outcome of whether or not a person places value on a specific topic. The relationship between someone and an event, in regard to psychological distance, is such that the greater the distance between the self and an event, the lower the mental perception of importance is for the person. Following this example, the less important an event is perceived, the less likely one is to act on it. This psychological distance causes behavioral differences, or non-existence of certain behaviors or attitudes all together, that alter one's response to an event by changing the perception of its importance in one's mind.

Psychological distance is fundamentally egocentric, the anchor point is the self, in the present, and the different interactions of the self with an object or event correlate to the different levels of distance.

== Psychological distance in environmental issues ==
Oftentimes, psychologically distant things are those that are not present or experienced frequently in everyday life. As noted above, this can be due to a variety of factors. Whether the distance is due to a lack of exposure, a lack of knowledge, a temporal difference, or being physically separated, all four create a distance that in some way limits exposure or frequency. This phenomenon is prevalent in many environmental issues such as climate change and its effects. Data has shown that the earth's average temperature has been steadily increasing over the last few hundred years. This directly correlates with higher levels of carbon dioxide (CO_{2}) in the atmosphere as a result of anthropogenic activities, starting around the industrial revolution (1740), that emit CO_{2} and other greenhouse gases (GHGs). Countries closer in proximity to the issue tend to place a higher level of importance on an issue as opposed to countries that are farther in proximity. While all regions/countries are affected by environmental issues, certain areas of the world feel these effects significantly more than others. This difference between the effects on certain areas of the world are key to understanding the role of psychological distance in environmental issues. Construal Level Theory concludes there is an inverse relationship between affected parties/exposure and psychological distance. In accordance with this theory, many areas of the world, such as the United States, are historically lacking on the world stage when it comes to environmental policy making in regards to other areas of the world such as Europe as a result of the country's general perceptions on environmental issues.

== Reasons for different levels of psychological distance in certain parts of the world ==
Several studies have concluded that public concern regarding climate change and environmental issues decreases as one's perceived psychological distance from the issue increases. According to the construal level theory (CLT), psychological distance from an event, issue or object is directly linked to the way that an individual or group of people mentally represent it. More specifically, issues or objects that are perceived as psychologically close are perceived in a “concrete” manner, meaning that a specific representation of those issues is generated. On the other hand, objects or events that are perceived as psychologically distant are perceived in an “abstract” manner, meaning that the cognitive representation of that issue is perceived in a broader sense.

This abstract contextualization of climate change as a slow, gradual modification to our current climate conditions makes it difficult to assess and understand the severity of climate change as a personal experience. Climate-related risk awareness has been positively linked with the perception of the severity of the global issue of climate change as well as the risk of negative effects that climate change can pose to an individual. According to Social Representations Theory (SRT), individuals apprehend unfamiliar risks (such as climate change) through symbols and iconic images that are presented in a socio-cultural context. SRT further demonstrates the way in which risk representations of climate change contrast globally and are mainly shaped by the local environment of an individual or group of people.

Compared to other issues pertaining to global society, the importance and awareness of climate change is low, which is likely due to the widespread perception that the risk associated with climate change to an individual is distant in space and time. For example, these issues of climate change are affecting areas that are distant, such as other countries or continents (space), or that only future generations will be affected (time). The phenomenon of psychological distance then decreases the public's ability to address and mitigate the effects of climate change.

== Reducing psychological distance ==
Public perception of climate change as a distant issue may threaten climate action. If the public's perception of their relative distance to climate change is driven by a construal level process, then the level at which the public construes climate change is an important determinant of their support for climate action. For example, an abstract construal level will likely lead to climate change being perceived as psychologically distant, which may result in dissension of the problem and unwillingness to tackle the issue. Conversely, a concrete construal is likely to lead to acceptance of climate change by the public through promoting a psychologically close view, which could result in a higher level of willingness to address climate change since the consequences of the issue or more tangible. Making the issue of climate change more localized, more relevant and more urgent will help to reduce the estrangement by people and help to increase pro-environmental behaviors.

Notably, CLT indicates that psychological distance is essential when promoting action. According to Goal Setting Theory, which was proposed by Locke and Latham in the 1990s, goals that are specific in nature are found to lead to a higher rate of task performance by reducing ambiguity about what stands to be accomplished or attained. Goals are thought to affect the performance of proposed tasks through four mechanisms. These mechanisms include: 1) directing attention towards actions that are relevant to the goal or task, 2) providing motivation to increase efforts, 3) increasing persistence, and 4) promoting the activation of knowledge on the issue at hand to better motivate and strategize to achieve the goal.

In terms of psychological distancing, the concept of goal setting theory would suggest that in order to counteract climate change, specific goals and/or policies that clearly state actions needed to be taken by governments, companies, the public, individuals, etc., would create a more concrete construal for the public, despite their psychological distance. This would in turn, lead to more successful mitigation of climate change.
