= Counterplanning =

Counterplanning in conflict resolution is the process through which an actor reaches his or her goals by formulating plans that account for the plans and goals of others (e.g. enemies, neutrals, or friends).

When the plans and goals of one actor interfere with those of another actor, a conflict exists. These conflicts lead to second- and third-order undesired effects. The best counterplanning techniques to be used in a given situation vary based on the characteristics of the conflict. Counterplanning techniques are common in everyday life and in military planning.

== Goal conflicts ==
Goal conflicts arise when the desired world states of one or more actors cannot co-exist. This can be resolved by a number of techniques, which fall into three types of strategies.

=== General strategies ===
- Block competing coal: One actor prevents the other from achieving its goal.
- Priority scheduling: One actor places time priority on its goal, achieving it before the other actor realizes its goal.
- Goal schedule interference: One actor delays the other actor's goal achievement.

=== Diversion strategies ===
- Threatening higher level goals: One actor causes a goal of another actor that is more important than the mutually exclusive goal to no longer be satisfied. This causes the other actor to focus on the higher priority goal.
- Dissipation of effort: One actor threatens goals of another actor, causing the other actor to apply its effort to fixing the disrupted goals rather than achieving the mutually exclusive goal.

Diversion strategies can either be applied directly or applied by deceiving the other actor into thinking certain goals are threatened.

=== Compromise strategies ===
- Partial fulfillment: Each actor partially achieves its goal.
- Goal substitution: One actor changes its goal to a non-mutually exclusive goal.
- Cooperation by mutual need: The actors can partially fulfill their goals only by working together.
- Mutual goal abandonment: If preventing the other actor from achieving its goal is more important than achieving the actor's own goal, one may convince the other to abandon its goal.

One must also account for counterplanning techniques applied by other actors. A goal conflict counterplanning technique called "Expected Blocking" involves preventing another actor from applying the techniques described above.

== Plan conflicts ==
Plan conflicts occur when the actions of one or more actors prevent other actions from achieving their desired effect. Plan conflicts can be analyzed on the following dimensions:

- Accidental versus intentional: An accidental plan conflict is when carrying out a plan inadvertently prevents another actor from completing its plan. An intentional plan conflict is when an actor carries out a plan, knowing that it will prevent another actor's plan from succeeding.
- Competitive versus cooperative: A competitive plan conflict occurs between actors, each of which benefit by preventing the other's success. A cooperative plan conflict occurs between actors who benefit from each other's success.
- Inconvenience versus total blockage: An inconvenient plan conflict can be resolved if one actor switches to an alternate plan which is capable of achieving the goal in question. A total blockage exists when there is no viable alternative.
- No underlying goal conflict versus underlying goal conflict: A plan conflict without an underlying goal conflict occurs when there is no disagreement about goal states, but accidental plan interference (as in the accidental plan conflict example above). When an underlying goal conflict exists, goal conflict mitigation strategies must be used (as in the intentional plan conflict example above).
- Internally versus externally motivated: An internally motivated plan conflict arises between the actors without external interference. An externally motivated plan conflict arises when outside forces place actors in conflict.
- Important goal threatened versus insignificant goal threatened: Actors are more likely to focus on resolving plan conflicts when the threatened goal is important.

== Examples ==
- Counterplanning as a form of deceptive defense tactic in cybersecurity.
- Counterplanning as an incentive scheme in the USSR.

== See also ==
- Decision-making software
- Direction of fit
- Goal modeling
- Goal orientation
- Goal programming
- Goal theory
- Management by objectives
- Moving the goalposts
- Objectives and key results (OKR)
- Strategic management
- Strategic planning
