= Regulatory mode theory =

Regulatory mode theory, along with regulatory focus theory was developed by E. Tory Higgins and Arie Kruglanski who are interested in the development of goal-pursuit as well as motivation. The theory depicts two main approaches to situations using locomotion and assessment.

== Background ==
The regulatory mode theory depicts how people approach situations to achieve the goal. This theory is part of E. Tory Higgins research in motivation theories and goal pursuit theories. People can either use the locomotion or the assessment method for goal-pursuit. E. Tory Higgins states, "When people self-regulate they decide what they want that they don’t currently have. They then figure out what they need to do to get what they want, and then they do it." People who are geared towards the locomotion mode are focused on moving and getting things done. In contrast, those that are strong in assessment will compare different goals and analyze different options.

== Locomotion and assessment ==
A study done by Pierro, Giacomantonio, Pica, Kruglanski, and Higgins (2011) examined the ways locomotion and assessment affect procrastination and how people manage time. The study found that assessment is positively related to procrastination and locomotion is negatively related to procrastination. To reach a certain goal, assessors have to analyze and compare a large amount of work. However, the locomotors were generally quicker to make decisions and act on them. The study emphasized that assessment orientation evaluates and analyzes in such detail that they delay making the decision quickly. Yet for the assessment-oriented individuals, they were more accurate in their decisions even though they took a longer time. These two regulatory modes reflect motivational styles for goal-pursuit. The motivation behind the assessment mode is accuracy and for locomotion mode it is action.

== Promoting value ==
A person's regulatory mode is correlated with regulatory fitness. They display their optimal level of performance in addition to valuing the end goals. In Avnet and Higgin's study (2004), the participants paid more for the book-light when their decisions were based on their regulatory orientation—either locomotion or assessment. They demonstrated that the value of the book-light is dependent on their approach systems.

== Motivation ==
Consequently, locomotion can be very efficient in maintaining attitude, creating intention, and facilitating behavior. Mannetti, Pierro, Higgins, and Kruglanski (2012) investigated peoples' commitment to exercising at the gym and how regularly they went. They evaluated the participants' regulatory mode using a questionnaire and then their attendance was recorded in a 6-month period. Results show that when the people had high locomotion concerns and they had positive attitudes about physical exercise, their intentions to engage in physical exercise were high. They would proceed to actually engage in physical exercise within the 6-month period. Since locomotion runs on the motivation to do and to act, the positive effects of making a behavior happen can be expanded to other areas.
