= GQM+Strategies =

GQM^{+}Strategies is a method that provides concepts and actionable steps for creating the link between goals and strategies across an organization and allows for measurement-based decision-making. It was developed by Victor Basili, Jens Heidrich, Mikael Lindvall, Jürgen Münch, Myrna Regardie, Carolyn B. Seaman, and Adam Trendowicz. The method was originally developed for organizations having a strong focus on IT and the development of software systems, but the method's popularity has grown to other domains and can be applied to any organization. The book Aligning Organizations through Measurement gives a comprehensive overview of the method, provides actionable guidance, case studies, and practical applications.

== Background ==
In today's competitive markets organizational survival and growth requires effective means of aligning the large variety of organizational goals and strategies to achieve business objectives. Effective alignment helps all parts of the organization move in the same direction. Determining the impact of business goals and strategies is crucial for effective decision making within a company. Different goals and strategies exist at different levels of an organization (e.g., on the management level, the department level, the project level). In practice, these goals and strategies are often not aligned and their success or failure is often determined as a gut feeling. For instance, in a software organization, engineers are frequently faced with apparently unrealistic goals related to software development. There is rarely a discussion of trade-offs or other options for such decisions in order to avoid deviations of budget and schedule. Goals and strategies need to be defined explicitly and derived from high-level business goals in a systematic and transparent way. Moreover, underlying assumptions and environmental factors are often not documented, which makes it hard to determine the reasons for failed strategies. Furthermore, if measurement data is collected on the project level, it is often unclear how the activities performed there and the data collected contribute to higher-level goals of the organization. Moreover, building an effective measurement program is a challenging task in itself. It involves observation, experience facilitation, collaboration, decision making, analysis, and synthesis regarding goals, context factors, and assumptions. Furthermore, it assumes an organizational structure that sustains the process and learns.

== Idea ==
The major output of applying the GQM^{+}Strategies approach is the so-called GQM^{+}Strategies grid. The grid specifies goals and strategies across all levels of an organization including the measurement program needed to monitor and control them. The underlying meta-model allows multiple goal levels and permits deriving multiple strategies for each of these goal levels. A goal may be realized by a set of strategies, which may in turn lead to a sequence of goals. Selection and adaptation of predefined goals and strategies as well as definition of new goals and strategies is driven by so-called context factors and assumptions. Context factors are environmental variables that represent the organizational environment and affect the kind of models and data that can be used (e.g., the type of business, the market of an organization). Assumptions are estimated unknowns that can affect the interpretation of the data (e.g., improving customer satisfaction will increase sales). The entire GQM^{+}Strategies model provides an organization with a mechanism not only for defining measurement consistent with larger, upper-level organizational concerns, but also for interpreting and rolling up the resulting measurement data at each level. At each goal level, measurement plans are defined in order to measure the achievement of the defined goal in combination with the chosen strategy though GQM.

The GQM^{+}Strategies application process supports building a grid in different ways depending on whether you want to start from the top level, from the bottom level, or from somewhere in the middle of an organization. In consequence the approach addresses relevant stakeholders throughout different organizational levels.

== Benefits ==
The GQM^{+}Strategies method makes high-level goals, strategies, and related measurement goals explicit across all levels of an organization. The entire method provides an organization with a mechanism for defining software measurement addressing larger, upper-level organizational concerns and for interpreting and rolling up the resulting measurement data at each level. GQM^{+}Strategies has numerous benefits such as the effective use of resources and rapid and focused improvement. It enables an organization to consistently align goals and strategies across different units, enable measurement-based decision making, transparently communicating goals and strategies within the organization, and objectively monitoring goal attainment and the success/failure of defined strategies. The approach works as an integrator for existing measurement approaches in an organization.

== Experiences and Practical Applications ==
GQM^{+}Strategies is typically used to link strategies with their impacts on goals and to identify existing gaps in aligning goals and strategies. Experiences from case studies in industry and evaluations of the method have been reported in literature, e.g., experiences from applying GQM+Strategies at Elektrobit and an evaluation with respect to the effects of GQM+Strategies on organizational alignment. Current research evaluated the approach utilizing revised Bloom's taxonomy as a framework for assessing the practitioners' cognition level of the concepts. Recent research also applied the GQM+Strategies approach to the IT Services domain.

The evaluation showed that the method has practical value and addresses current real-world problems. The approach has been applied in different industrial settings and different domains so far reaching from telecommunication, automotive, and aerospace to classical information system. Most of the case studies were focusing on setting up a grid. As organizational goals and strategies change, the grid needs to be adapted accordingly and needs to be deployed to organization in a controlled manner. Therefore, future work addresses deployment and maintenance aspects of the approach.

== Other Approaches ==
Several approaches to (software) measurement have been developed using different mechanisms for guiding the choice of data to be collected and analyzed:

- The GQM approach provides a method for defining goals, refining them into questions and finally data to be collected, and then analyzing and interpreting them. Several instruments and tools are available for visualizing the GQM model (e.g., as an abstraction sheet or a GQM tree).
- Balanced Scorecard (BSC) links strategic objectives and measures. The typical visualization consists of four perspectives: financial, customer, internal business processes, and learning and growth. Strategy maps are used to link strategies associated with those perspectives.
- Practical Software Measurement (PSM) offers detailed guidance on software measurement. Tree-like structures are used to link issues, measurement categories, and measures.
- Becker and Bostelman address the misalignment between strategy at the organizational level and the project level of software organizations. They focus on two causes of misalignment: (1) project data that does not address organizational goals and (2) organizational goals that are not operationalized through processes and metrics at the project level. The authors propose a common measurement framework to support the alignment of organizational and project-level goals. Their approach is to embed a GQM structure within each of the four BSC perspectives.
- The M3P – Model, Measure, Manage Paradigm – is an extension of the QIP and GQM presented by Offen and Jeffery. Similar to Becker and Bostelman's approach, M3P embeds GQM as a measurement definition technique within a larger framework that encompasses higher-level organizational concerns.
- COBIT and ITIL are approaches from the IT governance/service domain and offer connections between sets of goals and attributes of the IT infrastructure. COBIT uses a fixed linkage structure between outcome measures and performance indicators on the business, IT, process, and activity levels. Although these approaches recognize the need to link organizational goals and measures, they do not support building up a comprehensive grid of goals and strategies at different levels of the organization that are linked explicitly.
