= Counterplan (disambiguation) =

A counterplan is a plan set up in opposition to another plan.

Counterplan may also refer to:

- Counterplan, a component of debate theory, commonly used in policy debates
- Counterplan (Soviet planning), a plan put forth by workers to exceed the expectations of the state plan
- Counterplan (film), a 1931 Soviet film
