= E. Tory Higgins =

Canadian psychologist (born 1946)

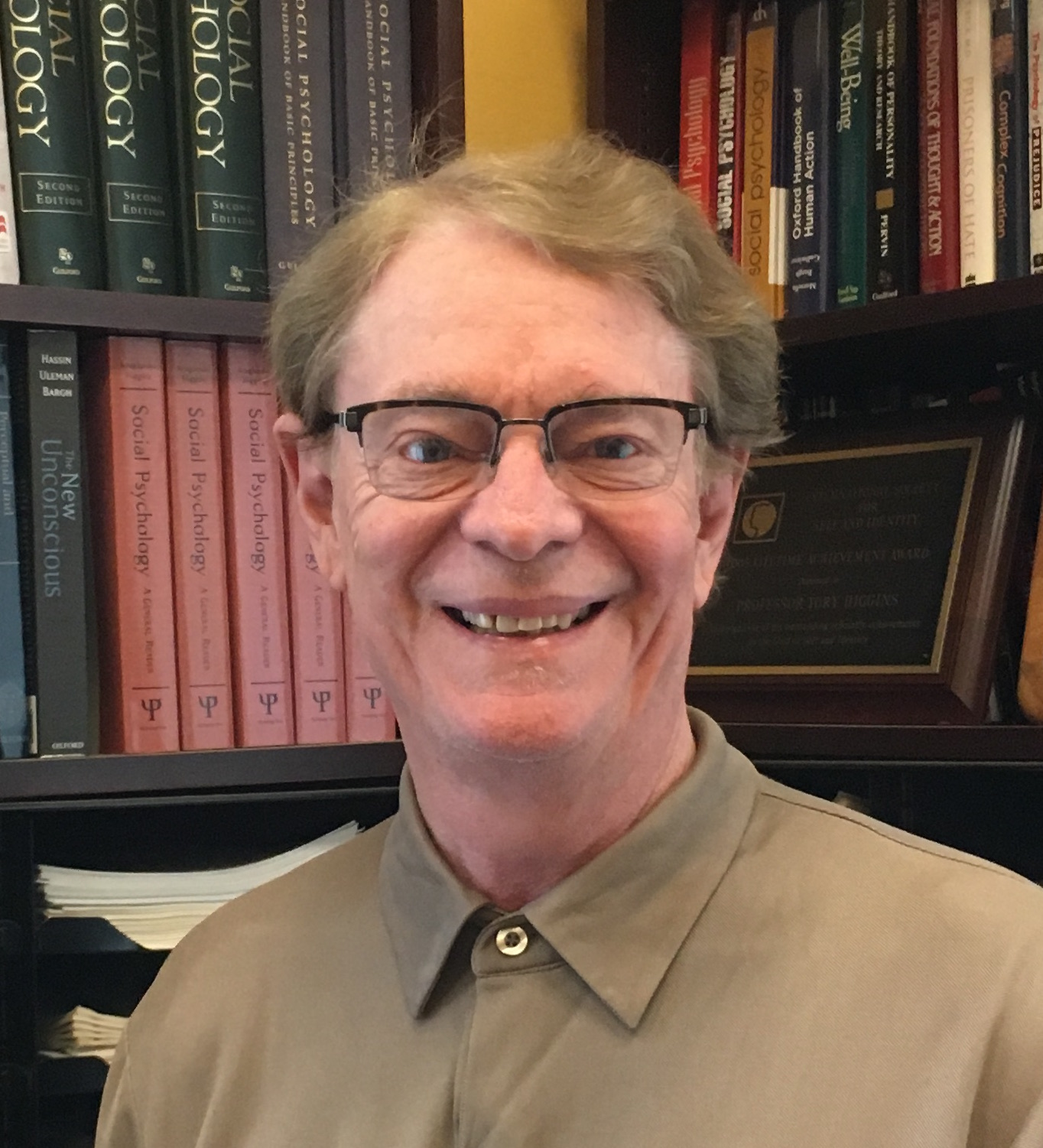
- Born: Edward Tory Higgins; March 12, 1946 (age 80)
- Education: McGill University; Columbia University
- Scientific career
- Fields: Social psychology, personality psychology, developmental psychology, social cognition, judgment and decision making, motivation science
- Workplaces: Columbia University (1989-present); Columbia Business School (2002-present); New York University (1981–1989); University of Western Ontario (1977–1981); Princeton University (1972–1977)

Edward Tory Higgins (born March 12, 1946) is the Stanley Schachter Professor of Psychology and Business, and Director of the Motivation Science Center at Columbia University. Higgins' research areas include motivation and cognition, judgment and decision-making, and social cognition. Most of his works focus on priming, self-discrepancy theory, and regulatory focus theory. He is also the author of Beyond Pleasure and Pain: How Motivation Works, and Focus: Use Different Ways of Seeing the World for Success and Influence (with Heidi Grant Halvorson).

== Career ==
Higgins received a Joint Honors B.A. degree in sociology and anthropology from McGill University in 1967, an M.A. in social psychology from the London School of Economics and Political Science in 1968, and a Ph.D. in psychology from Columbia University in 1973. His early work included the study of priming and accessibility, through which social judgment is influenced through the unconscious activation of social categories. In 1981, he was employed by New York University, where he collaborated with colleagues to reconstruct the social/personality psychology program. In 1989, Higgins returned to Columbia and assumed the role of Chair of the psychology department from 1994 to 2001.

At Columbia University, Higgins conducted research on the science of motivation and self-regulation. He further developed his previous research on self-discrepancy theory, exploring the gaps individuals perceive between their actual selves and the standards set by their "ideal" or "ought" self-guides. Based on self-discrepancy theory, Higgins then developed regulatory focus theory, which posits two distinct self-regulatory systems for approaching goals: achieving gains (promotion) and avoiding losses (prevention). In 2000, Higgins developed regulatory fit theory, proposing that people experience fit when using means of goal pursuit that align with their regulatory orientation: vigilant or eager. Also in 2000, Higgins and Arie Kruglanski developed regulatory mode theory, which describes two complementary self-regulatory functions: assessment and locomotion. These theories have also informed the development of Higgins' model of motivational effectiveness, which posits that motivation comprises distinct drives for value (achieving desired end-states), truth (understanding what's real), and control (managing what happens). Higgins has also studied shared reality, the motivation to create shared feelings, beliefs, and concerns with others.

== Selected awards ==
Higgins is a Fellow of the American Academy of Arts and Sciences. He gave the University Lecture at Columbia University and received Columbia's Presidential Award for Outstanding Teaching. He is a member of the Society for Personality and Social Psychology Wall of Fame and was recently awarded the Ambady Award for Mentoring Excellence (Society for Personality and Social Psychology). Selected additional awards include:

- Anneliese Maier Research Award 2016
- Lifetime Contribution Award (2005) from the International Society for Self & Identity
- Distinguished Scientist Award (2005) from the Society of Experimental Social Psychology
- Award for Distinguished Scientific Contributions (2000) from the American Psychological Association
- William James Fellow Award (2000) from the Association for Psychological Science for distinguished achievements in psychological science
- Thomas M. Ostrom Award (1999) from the Person Memory Interest Group for outstanding contributions to social cognition
- Donald T. Campbell Award (1996) from the Society for Personality and Social Psychology for outstanding contributions to social psychology

== Selected publications ==
=== Books ===
- Grant Halvorson, H., & Higgins, E. T. (2013). Focus: Use different ways of seeing the world for success and influence. New York: Penguin Press.
- Higgins, E. T., (2012). Beyond pleasure and pain: How motivation works. New York, NY: Oxford University Press.
- Higgins, E. T. (2019). Shared reality: What makes us strong and tears us apart. Oxford University Press.

=== Edited books and monographs (Representative) ===
- Echterhoff, G., & Higgins, E. T. (Eds.) (in press). Special issue of Current Opinion in Psychology: Shared reality. Amsterdam: Elsevier.
- Kruglanski, A. W., & Higgins, E. T. (Eds.) (2017). Special issue of Motivation Science: Interdisciplinary research in motivation science. Washington, D.C.: American Psychological Association.
- Van Lange, P., Kruglanski, A. W., & Higgins, E. T. (Eds.) (2012), Handbook of theories of social psychology. Thousand Oaks, CA: Sage Publications.
- Kruglanski, A. W., & Higgins, E. T. (Eds.) (2007). Social psychology: Handbook of basic principles, Second Edition. New York: Guilford.
- Kruglanski, A. W., & Higgins, E. T. (Eds.) (2004). Theory construction in social-personality psychology. Special issue of Personality and Social Psychology Review. Mahwah, NJ: Erlbaum.
- Higgins, E. T., & Kruglanski, A. W. (Eds.). (2000). Motivational science: Social and personality perspectives. Philadelphia, PA: Psychology Press.
- Sorrentino, R. M., & Higgins, E. T. (Eds.). (1996). Handbook of motivation and cognition: The interpersonal context. New York: Guilford.
- Levine, J. M., & Higgins, E. T. (Eds.), (1995). The social context of cognition. Special issue of Social Cognition. New York: Guilford.

=== Journal articles and book chapters (Representative) ===
- Webb, C. E., Coleman, P. T., Tomasulo, L. R., Rossignac-Millon, M., & Higgins, E. T. (2017). Moving on or digging deeper: Regulatory mode and interpersonal conflict resolution. Journal of Personality and Social Psychology, 112, 621–641.
- Echterhoff, G., & Higgins, E. T. (2017). Creating shared reality in interpersonal and intergroup communication: The role of epistemic processes and their interplay. European Review of Social Psychology, 28, 175–226.
- Higgins, E. T. (2016). Shared-reality development in childhood. Perspectives On Psychological Science, 11, 466–495.
- Cornwell, J. F. M., Franks, B., & Higgins, E. T. (2014). Truth, control, and value motivations: The 'what', 'how', and 'why' of approach and avoidance. Frontiers in Systems Neuroscience, 8,194.
- Higgins, E. T., Cornwell, J. F. M., & Franks, B. (2014). "Happiness" and "The Good Life" as motives working together effectively. In A. J. Elliot (Ed.), Advances in Motivation Science, Volume 1 (pp. 135–180). New York: Academic Press.
- Echterhoff, G., Kopietz, R., & Higgins, E. T. (2013). Adjusting shared reality: Communicators' memory changes as their connection with their audience changes. Social Cognition, 31, 162–186.
- Eitam, B., & Higgins, E. T. (2010). Motivation in mental accessibility: Relevance of a Representation (ROAR) as a new framework. Social and Personality Psychology Compass, 4, 951–967.
- Higgins, E. T., Cesario, J., Hagiwara, N., Spiegel, S., & Pittman, T. (2010). Increasing or decreasing interest in activities: The role of regulatory fit. Journal of Personality and Social Psychology, 98(4), 559–572.
- Echterhoff, G., Higgins, E. T., & Levine, J. M. (2009). Shared reality: Experiencing commonality with others' inner states about the world. Perspectives on Psychological Science, 4, 496–521.
- Echterhoff, G., Higgins, E. T., Kopietz, R., & Groll, S. (2008). How communication goals determine when audience tuning biases memory. Journal of Experimental Psychology: General, 137(1), 3-21.
- Higgins, E. T., Echterhoff, G., Crespillo, R. & Kopietz, R. (2007). Effects of communication on social knowledge: Sharing reality with individual vs. group audiences. Japanese Psychological Research, 49, 89–99.
- Higgins, E. T. (2006). Value from hedonic experience and engagement. Psychological Review.
- Echterhoff, G., Higgins, E. T., & Groll, S. (2005). Audience-tuning effects on memory: The role of shared reality. Journal of Personality and Social Psychology, 89, 257–276.
- Forster, J., Liberman, N., & Higgins, E. T. (2005). Accessibility from active and fulfilled goals. Journal of Experimental Social Psychology, 41, 220–239.
- Higgins, E. T., Idson, C. L., Freitas, A. L., Spiegel, S., & Molden, D. C. (2003). Transfer of value from fit. Journal of Personality and Social Psychology, 84(6), 1140–1153.
- Higgins, E. T. (2000). Making a good decision: Value from fit. American Psychologist, 55, 1217–1230.
- Higgins, E. T. (2000). Social cognition: Learning about what matters in the social world. European Journal of Social Psychology, 30, 3-39.
- Higgins, E. T. (1997). Beyond pleasure and pain. American Psychologist, 52, 1280–1300.
- Hardin, C. D., & Higgins, E. T. (1996). Shared reality: How social verification makes the subjective objective. In E. T. Higgins & R. M. Sorrentino (Eds.), Handbook of motivation and cognition: The interpersonal context (Vol. III). New York: Guilford Press.
- Higgins, E. T., Roney, C. J. R., Crowe, E., & Hymes, C. (1994). Ideal versus ought predilections for approach and avoidance: Distinct self-regulatory systems. Journal of Personality and Social Psychology, 66, 276–286.
- Higgins, E. T. (1987). Self-discrepancy: A theory relating self and affect. Psychological Review, 94, 319–340.
- Higgins, E. T., Bargh, J. A., & Lombardi, W. (1985). The nature of priming effects on categorization. Journal of Experimental Psychology: Learning, Memory, and Cognition, 11, 59–69.
- Higgins, E.T., King, G. A., & Mavin, G. H. (1982). Individual construct accessibility and subjective impressions and recall. Journal of Personality and Social Psychology, 43, 35–47.
- Higgins, E.T., Rholes, W.S., & Jones, C.R. (1977). Category Accessibility and Impression Formation. Journal of Experimental Social Psychology, 13, 141–154.

== See also ==
- Self-discrepancy theory
- Regulatory focus theory
- Regulatory mode theory
