= Self-discrepancy theory =

Psychological theory

The self-discrepancy theory states that individuals compare their "actual" self to internalized standards or the "ideal/ought self". Inconsistencies between "actual", "ideal" (idealized version of yourself created from life experiences) and "ought" (who persons feel they should be or should become) are associated with emotional discomforts (e.g., fear, threat, restlessness). Self-discrepancy is the gap between two of these self-representations that leads to negative emotions.

Developed by Edward Tory Higgins in 1987, the theory provides a platform for understanding how different types of discrepancies between representations of the self are related to different kinds of emotional vulnerabilities. Higgins sought to illustrate that internal disagreement causes emotional and psychological turmoil. There were several previous theories proving this concept such as the self-inconsistency theory, the cognitive dissonance theory, and the Balance theory (e.g., Heider, 1958); however, Higgins wanted to take it one step further by determining the specific emotions that surfaced as a result of these internal disagreements. Previous self-imbalance theories had recognized only positive or negative emotions. The self-discrepancy theory was the first to assign specific emotions and affects to the disparity.

The theory proposes how a variety of self-discrepancies represents a variety of types of negative psychological situations that are associated with different kinds of discomfort. A primary goal of the self-discrepancy theory is to create an understanding of which types of contrasting ideas will cause such individuals to feel different kinds of negative emotions.

The structure of the theory was built based on three ideas. First classify the different kinds of discomfort felt by those people holding contrasting ideals experienced, as well as the various types of emotional vulnerabilities felt by the different types of discrepancies. Lastly, to consider the role of the different discrepancies in influencing the kind and type of discomfort individuals are most likely to experience.

== Domains of the self ==
The theory postulates three basic domains of the self:

=== Actual ===
Actual self is one's representation of the attributes that one believes one actually possesses, or that one believes others believe one possesses. The "actual self" is a person's basic self-concept. It is one's perception of their own attributes (intelligence, athleticism, attractiveness, etc.).

=== Ideal ===
Ideal self is one's representation of the attributes that someone (oneself or another) would like one, ideally, to possess (i.e., a representation of someone's hopes, aspirations, or wishes for one). The "ideal-self" is what usually motivates individuals to change, improve and achieve.

The ideal self-regulatory system focuses on the presence or absence of positive outcomes (e.g., love provided or withdrawn).

=== Ought ===
Ought is one's representation of the attributes that someone (oneself or another) believes one should or ought to possess (i.e., a representation of someone's sense of one's duty, obligations, or responsibilities).

The ought self-regulatory system focuses on the presence or absence of negative outcomes (e.g., criticism administered or suspended).

==== Example ====
To illustrate the differences between Ideal and Ought selves, Hardin & Lankin (2009) give the example of wealth. A person may hope to ideally be rich someday, but they feel no duty or moral obligation to be rich. Rich would therefore describe their ideal self, but not their ought self. Their actual self would be dependent upon how they perceive their current socioeconomic status.

== Standpoints of the self ==
Self-discrepancy theory initiates the importance of considering two different standpoints (or vantage points) in which "the self" is perceived. A standpoint on the self is defined as "a point of view from which you can be judged that reflects a set of attitudes or values."

=== Own ===
An individual's own personal standpoint.

=== Other ===
The standpoint of some significant other. Significant others may comprise parents, siblings, spouses, or friends. The "other" standpoint is what the self perceives their significant other's standpoint to be.

Except for theories focusing on the actual self, previous theories of the self had not systematically considered the different domain of self in terms of the different standpoints on those domains. These two constructs provide the basis from which discrepancies arise; that is, when certain domains of the self are at odds with one another, individuals experience particular emotional affects (ex: one's beliefs concerning the attributes one would personally like ideally to possess versus your beliefs concerning the attributes that some significant other person, such as your mother, would like you ideally to possess).

== Discrepancies ==
Discrepancies create two major types of negative physiological situations: absence of positive outcomes, which is associated with dejection-related emotions, and the presence of negative outcomes which is associated with agitation-related emotions.

	Actual	Ideal	Ought
Own	Self-Concept	Self-Guide	Self-Guide
Other	Self-Concept	Self-Guide	Self-Guide

=== Self-concept ===
==== Actual/own vs. actual/other ====
These self-state representations are the basic self-concept (from either or both standpoints). Discrepancies between own self-concept, and other self-concept can be described as an identity crisis, which often occurs during adolescence. Guilt is a characteristic result of discrepancy from the own perspective. Shame is a characteristic result of discrepancy from the other perspective.

=== Self-guide ===
==== Actual/own vs. ideal/own ====
In this discrepancy, a person's view of their actual attributes does not match the ideal attributes they hope to develop. Discrepancy between these self-guides is characterized by dejection-related emotions such as disappointment and dissatisfaction. Actual/ideal discrepancies are associated with low self-esteem and characterized by the threat of absence of positive outcomes. Specifically, an individual is predicted to be vulnerable to disappointment or dissatisfaction because these emotions are associated with people believing that their personal wishes have been unfulfilled. These emotions have been described as being associated with the individuals' own standpoint and a discrepancy from his or her hope, desire, or ideals. The motivational nature of this discrepancy also suggests that it could be associated with frustration because of these unfulfilled desires. Emotions such as blameworthiness, feeling no interest in things, and not feeling effective was also associated with this discrepancy. In addition, this discrepancy is also associated with dejection from perceived lack of effectiveness or self-fulfillment. This discrepancy is uniquely associated with depression.

==== Actual/own vs. ideal/other ====
Here, one's view of their actual attributes does not match the ideal attributes their significant other hopes or wishes for them. The ideal self-guide is characterized by the absence of positive outcomes, and accompanied by dejection-related emotions. More specifically, because one believes that they have failed to obtain some significant other's hopes or wishes are likely to believe that the significant other is disappointed and dissatisfied with them. In turn, individuals will be vulnerable to shame, embarrassment, or feeling downcast, because these emotions are associated with people believing that they have lost standing or esteem in the eyes of others. Analysis of shame and related emotions have been described as being associated with the standpoint of one or more other people and discrepancies from achievement and/or status standards. Other analyses describe shame as being associated with concern over losing the affection or esteem of others. When people have a sense of the difference between their actual self and their social ideal self, an individual will experience feelings of shame and unworthiness. Shame that is often experienced when there is a failure to meet a significant other's goals or wishes involves loss of face and presumed exposure to the dissatisfaction of others. Feeling lack of pride, lack of feeling sure of self and goals, feeling lonely, feeling blue, and feeling not interested in things was also associated with this discrepancy. This discrepancy is associated with dejection from perceived or anticipated loss of social affection or esteem.

==== Actual/own vs. ought/other ====
This discrepancy exists when a person's own standpoint does not match what they believe a significant other considers to be his or her duty or obligation to attain. Agitation-related emotions are associated with this discrepancy and results in the presence of negative outcomes. More specifically, because violation of prescribed duties and obligations is associated with punishment, this particular discrepancy represents the presence of negative outcomes. The individual experiencing this discrepancy will have an expectation of punishment; therefore, the person is predicted to be vulnerable to fear and feeling threatened, because these emotions occur when danger or harm is anticipated or impending. Analyses of such emotions have described them as being associated with the standpoint of one or more other people and discrepancy from norms or moral standards. The motivational nature of this discrepancy suggests that one might experience feelings of resentment. The feeling of resentment arises from the anticipated pain to be inflicted by others. The person might also experience anxiety because of apprehension over negative responses from others. This discrepancy is associated with agitation from fear and threat. In addition, it is also associated with agitation from self-criticism. Social anxiety is uniquely associated with this discrepancy.

==== Actual/own vs. ought/own ====
A discrepancy between these self-guides occurs when one's view of their actual attributes does not meet the expectations of what they think they ought to possess. This discrepancy is associated with the presence of negative outcomes and is characterized by agitation-related emotions such as self-dissatisfaction. An individual predicts a readiness for self-punishment. The person is predicted to be vulnerable to guilt, self-contempt, and uneasiness, because these particular feelings occur when people believe they have transgressed a personally legitimate and accepted moral standard. Analysis of guilt has described it as associated with a person's own standpoint and a discrepancy from his or her sense of morality or justice. The motivational nature of this discrepancy suggests associations with feelings of moral worthlessness or weakness. Transgression of one's own internalized moral standards has been associated with guilt and self-criticism because when people attribute failure to a lack of sufficient effort on their part, they experience feelings of guilt.

=== Ideal vs. ought ===
Ideal self and ought self act as self guides with which the actual self aspires to be aligned. The ideal self represents hopes and wishes, whereas the ought self is determined through obligation and sense of duty. In terms of the ideal or ought discrepancy and specific to self-regulatory approach vs. avoidance behaviors, the ideal domain is predisposed to approach behavior and the ought domain is predisposed to avoidance behavior.

== Another domain of self ==
In 1999 Charles Carver and associates made a new amendment to the theory by adding the domain of feared self. Unlike the self guides proposed by Higgins which imply an actual or desired (better) self, the feared self is a domain that measures what one does not desire to be. In many cases, this may have a different level of influence in terms of priority on the self than previous domains and self-guides. It is human nature to avoid negative affect before approaching positives.

== Availability and accessibility of self-discrepancies ==
Beliefs that are incongruent are cognitive constructs and can vary in both their availability and accessibility. In order to establish which types of discrepancies an individual holds and which are likely to be active and produce their associated emotions at any point, the availability and accessibility of self-discrepancies must be distinguished.

=== Availability ===
The availability of a self-discrepancy depends on the extent to which the attributes of the two conflicted self-state representations diverge for the person in question. Each attribute in one of the self-state representations (actual/own) is compared to each attribute in the other self-state representation (ideal/own). Each pair of attributes is either a match or a mismatch. The larger variance between the number of matches and the number of nonmatches (i.e., the greater the divergence of attributes between the two self-state representations), the larger the magnitude of that type of self-discrepancy that is available. Furthermore, the greater the magnitude of a particular discrepancy produces more intense feelings of discomfort accompanying the discrepancy when activated.

The availability of the self-discrepancy is not enough to influence emotions. In order to do so, the self-discrepancy must also be activated. The variable that influences the probability of activation is its accessibility.

=== Accessibility ===
The accessibility of a self-discrepancy depends on the same factors that determine the accessibility of any stored construct. One factor is how recently the construct has been activated. The more often a construct is activated, the more likely it will be used later on to understand social events. The accessibility or likelihood of activation, of a stored construct also depends on the relation between its "meaning" and the properties of the stimulus event. A stored construct will not be used to interpret an event unless it is applicable to the event. Thus the negative psychological situation represented in a self-discrepancy (i.e. the "meaning" of the discrepancy) will not be activated by an explicitly positive event. In sum, the accessibility of self-discrepancy is determined by its recency of activation, its frequency of activation, and its applicability to the stimulus event. The theory posits that the greater the accessibility of a self-discrepancy, the more powerfully the person will experience the emotion accompanying that discrepancy.

The theory does not propose that individuals are aware of the accessibility or availability of their self-discrepancies. However, it is obvious that both the availability and accessibility can influence social information processing automatically and without awareness. Thus, self-discrepancy theory simulates that the available and accessible negative psychological situations embodied in one's self-discrepancies can be used to provide meaning to events without being aware of either the discrepancies or their impact on processing. The measure of self-discrepancies requires only that one be able to retrieve attributes of specific self-state representations when asked to do so. It does not require that one be aware of the relations among these attributes of their significance.

Self-discrepancy theory hypothesizes that the greater the magnitude of a particular type of self-discrepancy possessed by a person, the more strongly the person will experience the emotion associated with that type of discrepancy.

== Application and use ==
Self-discrepancy theory becomes applicable when addressing some of the psychological problems individuals face with undesired self-image. The theory has been applied to psychological problems faced by college students compromising their career choice, understanding clinically depressed students, eating disorders, mental health and depression in chronically ill women and even developing self-confidence in athletes. Self-Discrepancy Theory inherently provides a means to systematically lessen negative affect associated with self-discrepancies by reducing the discrepancies between the self domains in conflict of one another (Higgins, 1987). Not only has it been applied to psychological health, but also to other research and understanding to human emotions such as shame and guilt. The self-guided pressure society and ourselves induce throw an individual into turmoil. The theory finds many of its uses geared toward mental health, anxiety, and depression. Understanding what emotions are being aroused and the reasoning is important to reinstate psychological health.

=== Procrastination ===
Studies have correlated the theory and procrastination. Specifically, discrepancies in the actual/ought domain from the own perspective, are the strongest predictor of procrastination. Avoidance is the common theme. The actual/ought self-regulatory system responds through avoidance. Procrastinators also have an avoidance relationship with their goals.

=== Depression ===
Depression is associated with conflict between a person's perceived actual self, and some standard, goal or aspiration. An actual/ought discrepancy triggers agitated depression (characterized by feelings of guilt, apprehension, anxiety or fear). An actual/ideal discrepancy triggers dejected depression (characterized by feelings of failure, disappointment, devaluation or shame).

=== Emotions ===
Higgins measured how individuals experienced self-discrepancies by having individuals reminisce and remember about "negative events or personal self-guides, including hopes, goals, duties, and obligations, and measure what will help increase the kind of discomfort that the individual experiences. The study found the "absence of an actual/own and ideal/own discrepancy" is associated with the emotions "happy" and "satisfied" and the "absence of an actual/own and ought/other discrepancy" is associated with the emotions "calm" and "secure" (p. 336).

== New findings ==
Since its original conception in 1987, there have been a number of studies that have tested the legitimacy of self-discrepancy theory. Some of their findings do in fact contradict certain aspects of the theory, while another finds further evidence of its validity. These studies give insight into the research that has been done regarding self-discrepancy theory since its original conception in 1987.

Conducted in 1998, "Are Shame and Guilt Related to Distinct Self-Discrepancies? A Test of Higgins's (1987) Hypotheses", brought into question the correlations between specific discrepancy and emotional discomforts laid out by self-discrepancy theory. Researches believed that there was no way to tie a unique emotional discomfort to one internal discrepancy, but rather that various internal discrepancies result in a variety of discomforts. The study was carried out and the hypothesis was confirmed based on the results. The findings displayed no evidence suggesting a direct tie between specific discomforts and type of internal discrepancy.

"Self-discrepancies: Measurement and Relation to Various Negative Affective States", also brought into question the core aspect of self-discrepancy theory – The correlation between specific discrepancies and the emotional discomforts that result. This study went one step further, also testing the validity of two methods used to observe internal discrepancies; "The Selves Questionnaire" or "SQ" along with the "Adjective Rating List" or "ARL". The study found a strong relationship in results from both methods, speaking to their validity. The results, though, did bring into question the original research done by Higgins, as there were no ties found between specific internal discrepancies and unique emotional discomforts. One of the researchers in this study wrote "Overall, these findings raise significant concerns about the relevance of self-discrepancies as measured by the SQ and ARL and fail to support the main contentions of self-discrepancy theory".

"Self-discrepancy: Long-term test–retest reliability and test–criterion predictive validity", published in 2016, tested the long-term validity of self-discrepancy theory. Researchers found evidence to support the long-term validity of the self-discrepancy personality construct along with anxiety and depression having a direct relationship with internal discrepancies.
