= Arie W. Kruglanski =

American psychologist (born 1939)

- Born: 1939 (age 86–87); Łódź, Poland
- Occupation: Social psychologist
- Known for: Work on cognitive closure

Arie W. Kruglanski (born 1939) is a Polish-born American social psychologist known for his work on goal systems, regulatory mode, and cognitive closure. He is currently a distinguished professor of psychology at the University of Maryland, College Park.

== Early life ==
Kruglanski was born in 1939, in Łódź. His family later moved to Israel, where Arie attended high school and served in the armed forces.

== Career ==
Arie Kruglanski received his B.A. from the University of Toronto in 1966, and his Ph.D. in Psychology from the University of California, Los Angeles in 1968 under the mentorship of Harold H. Kelley. He is currently a distinguished university professor at the University of Maryland. Kruglanski's research interests have centered on the psychology of motivation and cognition, as well as on group processes and interpersonal relations. Kruglanski has formulated a number of theories in these domains including the theory of lay epistemics (1989) (and its counterpart, the theory of epistemic motivations), the theory of regulatory mode with E. Tory Higgins (2000), a theory of goal systems (2002), a psychological theory of extremism (2021), and significance-quest theory (2022). These theories inspired empirical research in various domains of psychology and have led to development of scales that measure the need for cognitive closure (with Donna Webster, 1994) and regulatory modes of locomotion and assessment (with Tory Higgins, 2000).

In the aftermath of September 11 attacks, Kruglanski developed an interest in the study of violent extremism. He co-founded a center for excellence, START at the University of Maryland in 2006 (for the study of terrorism and the response to terrorism), and has empirically studied the psychology of terrorism and radicalization in various regions of the world including Sri Lanka, the Philippines, Indonesia, the Maghreb, the Middle East, Europe and the U.S. Based on this work, Kruglanski has developed the 3N model of radicalization including the essential parameters of need, narrative and network as the essential ingredients of radicalization. Among others, Kruglanski and his students studied captive Liberation Tigers of Tamil Eelam after the defeat of that South Asian terror group, finding that de-radicalization is possible with a systematic process involving the 3N framework.

Among the projects the Kruglanski lab is pursuing are violent extremism, political activism, the quest for significance, coping with uncertainty, and closed-mindedness. Their research uses a variety of methods, including lab experiments, neuroscience techniques, computer modeling, text analyses, and surveys. The laboratory collaborates closely with the Sapienza University of Rome (Italy), the Jagiellonian University (Kraków, Poland), the University of Groningen (the Netherlands), and Nanyang Technological University (Singapore).

Kruglanski has served as editor-in-chief of the Journal of Personality and Social Psychology: Attitudes and Social Cognition, as editor-in-chief of Personality and Social Psychology Bulletin, as associate editor of American Psychologist, and as president of the Society for the Science of Motivation (2014–15). He is member of several editorial boards including the editorial board of Psychological Review.

In 2018, a Festschrift for Kruglanski was held at the University of Maryland, and a volume was published with contributions to the Festschrift.

== Selected publications ==
=== Books ===
- Kruglanski, A. W. (1989). Lay epistemics and human knowledge: Cognitive and motivational bases. New York: Springer
- Kruglanski, A. W. (2004). The psychology of closed mindedness. New York: Psychology Press.
- Kruglanski, A.W., Belanger, J.J. & Gunaratna, R. (2019). The three pillars of radicalization: Needs, narratives, and networks. New York: Oxford University Press.
- Kruglanski, A.W., Webber, D. & Koehler, D. (2019). Radicals' journey: German Neo-Nazis' voyage to the edge and back. New York: Oxford University Press.
- Kruglanski, A.W. (2019). The motivated mind. London, UK: Psychology Press

=== Edited collections ===
- Kruglanski, A.W., Szumowska, E. & Kopetz, C. (2021). The psychology of extremism. London: Routledge.
- Kruglanski, A. W. & Stroebe, W. (Eds). (2012). Handbook of the history of social psychology. New York: Francis & Taylor.
- Forgas, J.P., Kruglanski, A.W., & Williams, K.D. (Eds.) (2011). The psychology of social conflict and aggression. New York: Psychology Press.
- Kruglanski, A. W., Higgins, E. T., & Van Lange, P. A. M. (Eds.). (2011). Handbook of theories of social psychology. Newbury Park, CA: Sage.
- Victoroff, J., & Kruglanski, A. W. (Eds.) (2009). Psychology of terrorism. New York: Psychology Press.
- Kruglanski, A. W., & Higgins, E. T. (Eds.) (2007). Social psychology: A handbook of basic principles, 2nd edition. New York: Francis & Taylor.
- Kruglanski, A.W., & Higgins, E.T. (Eds.) (2003). Social psychology: A general reader. Philadelphia, PA: Psychology Press.
- Higgins, E.T., & Kruglanski, A.W. (Eds.) (2000). Motivational science. Philadelphia, PA: Psychology Press.
- Higgins, E. T., & Kruglanski, A. W. (Eds.) (1996). Social psychology: A Handbook of Basic Principles. New York: Guilford Press.
- Bar-Tal, D., Graumann, C.F., Kruglanski, A.W., &Stroebe, W. (Eds.) (1989). Stereotyping and prejudice: Changing conceptions. New York: Springer-Verlag.
- Bar-Tal, D., & Kruglanski, A. W. (Eds.) (1988). The social psychology of knowledge. New York: Cambridge University Press.
- Stroebe, W., Kruglanski, A. W., Hewstone, M., & Bar-Tal, D. (Eds.) (1988). The social psychology of inter-group and international conflict. New York: Springer.

=== Journal articles ===
- Jost, J.T., Glaser, J., Kruglanski, A.W. & Sullaway, F.J. (2003). Political conservatism as motivated social cognition. Psychological Bulletin, 129, 339-375.
- Kruglanski, A.W., Molinario, E., Jasko, K. Webber, D., Leander, N.P. & Pierro, A. (2022). Significance-quest theory. Perspectives in Psychological Science.
- Kruglanski, A.W., Szumowska, E., Kopetz, C., Vallerand, R.J., & Pierro, A. (2021). On the psychology of extremism: How motivational imbalance breeds intemperance. Psychological Review, 128(2), 264.
- Ajzen, I., & Kruglanski, A. W. (2019). Reasoned action in the service of goal pursuit. Psychological Review, 126(5), 774–786.
- Kruglanski, A. W., Fishbach, A., Woolley, K., Bélanger, J. J., Chernikova, M., Molinario, E., & Pierro, A. (2018). A structural model of intrinsic motivation: On the psychology of means-ends fusion. Psychological Review, 125(2), 165–182.
- Kruglanski, A.W., Jasko, K., Chernikova, M., Milyavsky, M. Babush, M., Baldner, C. & Pierro, A. (2016). The rocky road from attitudes to behaviors: Charting the goal systemic course of actions. Psychological Review.
- Kruglanski, A. W., Chernikova, M., Rosenzweig, E., & Kopetz, C. (2014). On motivational readiness. Psychological Review, 121(3), 367.
- Kruglanski, A.W., Belanger, J., Chen, X., Kopetz, C. Pierro, A. & Mannetti, L. (2012). The energetics of motivated cognition: A force field analysis. Psychological Review, 119, 1-20.
- Kruglanski, A.W., & Gigerenzer, G. (2011). Intuitive and deliberate judgments are based on common principles. Psychological Review, 118, 97–109.
- Kruglanski, A.W., Pierro, A., Mannetti, L. & DeGrada, E. (2006). Groups as epistemic providers: Need for closure and the unfolding of group centrism. Psychological Review, 113, 84–100.
- Kruglanski, A.W., Shah, J.Y., Fishbach, A. & Friedman, R., Chun, W. & Sleeth-Keppler, D. (2002). A theory of goals systems. Advances in Experimental Social Psychology, 34, 331–378.
- Kruglanski, A.W. & Webster, D.M. (1996). Motivated closing of the mind: "Seizing" and "freezing". Psychological Review, 103, 263 283.
- Kruglanski, A. (1980). Lay epistemologic process and contents: Another look at attribution theory. Psychological Review, 87, 70 87.
- Kruglanski, A. (1975). The endogenous exogenous partition in attribution theory. Psychological Review, 82, 3 87 406

== Selected awards ==
- 1998 Society for Personality and Social Psychology: Donald T. Campbell Award
- 2002 Distinguished Faculty Research Fellowship Award, University of Maryland
- 2003 Distinguished University Professor, University of Maryland
- 2003 Humboldt Forschungspreis, (lifetime achievement award)
- 2007 Distinguished Scientific Contribution Award, Society for Experimental Social Psychology
- 2021 Distinguished Scientific Contribution Award, Society for the Science of Motivation
- 2025 William James Award. Association for Psychological Science
- 2025 Distinguished Scientific Contribution Award, American Psychological Association

== See also ==
- Closure (psychology)
- Regulatory mode theory
