= Goal orientation =

Social-cognitive motivational disposition

Goal orientation, or achievement orientation, is an "individual disposition towards developing or validating one's ability in achievement settings". In general, an individual can be said to be mastery or performance oriented, based on whether one's goal is to develop one's ability or to demonstrate one's ability, respectively. A mastery orientation is also sometimes referred to as a learning orientation.

Goal orientation refers to how an individual interprets and reacts to tasks, resulting in different patterns of cognition, affect and behavior. Developed within a social-cognitive framework, the orientation goal theory proposes that students' motivation and achievement-related behaviors can be understood by considering the reasons or purposes they adopt while engaged in academic work. The focus is on how students think about themselves, their tasks, and their performance. Goal orientations have been shown to be associated with individuals' academic achievement, adjustment, and well-being.

Research has examined goal orientation as a motivation variable that is useful for recruitment, climate and culture, performance appraisal, and choice. It has also been used to predict sales performance, adaptive performance, goal setting, learning and adaptive behaviors in training, and leadership.

== History ==
=== McClelland ===
Research on achievement motivation can be traced back to the 1940s following the seminal work of David McClelland and colleagues who established the link between achievement and motivations (see need for achievement). Students' goal orientations were shown to be predictive of academic performance. Specifically, students with high goal orientation tended to value competence, expect success and seek challenges, while students with low achievement motivation tended to expect failure and avoid challenges.

In an effort to better understand the mechanisms underlying achievement, personality and social psychology researchers expanded McClelland's work by examining how cognitive representations shape social experiences. Personality researchers have explored aspects of goal motivation as an aspect of identity, whereas social psychologists have focused on the thought patterns that arise across various contexts.

=== Eison ===
Conceptualizations of goal orientation were proposed in the 1970s by educational psychologist Eison. Eison argued that students who attended college as an opportunity to acquire new skills and knowledge possessed a mastery orientation (which he referred to as learning orientation), while students who attended college to exclusively obtain high grades possessed a grade orientation. Eison originally believed that these two orientations were two ends of the same continuum and developed the Learning Orientation-Grade Orientation Scale to measure it.

=== Nicholls ===
Meanwhile, Nicholls was developing a related theory that goal motivation would lead grade school children to set high task-related goals. Nicholls found that some high-ability children would use maladaptive strategies when they encountered difficult tasks, which led to eventual feelings of helplessness. By contrast, others would use more productive coping strategies to avoid helplessness. Nicholls later conceptualized these differences as two types of achievement goals: task involvement, where individuals seek to develop their competence relative to their abilities, and ego involvement, where individuals seek to develop their competence relative to the abilities of others.

Nicholls' early work set the stage for Carol Dweck's work.

== Components and conceptualizations ==
There are multiple conceptualizations and operationalizations of goal orientation. Dweck's initial research suggested two component of goal orientation, learning orientation or performance orientation which was assessed in children based on task preference. Later research by Elliot and VandeWalle suggested a three factor model. Vandewalle's research suggested three factors: learning, avoiding poor performance, and demonstrating good performance. Concurrently, Elliot developed a model of goal orientation in terms of avoiding poor outcomes vs achieving good outcomes and mastery vs performance, which improved measures of intrinsic motivation and suggested a three factor model: mastery achievement, performance-approach and performance-avoid.

=== Two factor model ===
Dweck proposed that there are two types of goal orientation: mastery orientation and performance orientation. Dweck postulated that children with learning goals were believed to approach situations to master the acquisition of new skills, while children with performance goals were believed to approach situations to gain approval from peers and teachers. Like Eison, Dweck conceptualized goal orientation as a two-dimension construct. Individuals with a mastery orientation seek to develop their competence by acquiring new skills and mastering new situations. They are not concerned about their performance relative to others, but rather with furthering their understanding of a given topic or task. Individuals with a performance orientation seek to demonstrate and validate the adequacy of their competence to receive favorable compliments while avoiding negative judgments. Although Dweck's work in this area built on the foundation laid by Nicholls, the fundamental difference between the two scholars' works is the attribution of an individual's goal orientation: Nicholls believed that the goal orientation held by an individual was a result of the possession of either an internal or external referent, while Dweck considered the adoption of a particular goal orientation to be related to the theory of intelligence held by that individual.

Subsequent work by Eison and colleagues in 1982 led to a change in the conceptualization of these orientations from two ends of a continuum to two separate constructs. More recently, researchers have embraced the idea that individuals can adopt the two orientation styles simultaneously: individuals can be independently high or low in learning and performance orientations. Ultimately, they can entertain multiple competing goal orientations at the same time, and strive to both outperform competitors and improve their performance. This line of thinking led to the conceptualization of two separate continua: one for mastery orientation and one for performance orientation.

Significant research and a consistent pattern of results have demonstrated that an individual's goal orientation in a particular domain can be characterized by one of two distinct profiles: mastery orientation or performance orientation.

=== Expanded models ===
Researchers have conducted validation studies to demonstrate the statistical and conceptual distinction of further dimensions to goal orientation.

In 1996, Elliot broke down the traditional mastery and performance orientations to include approach and avoidance components, resulting in four distinct profiles: mastery-approach, mastery-avoidance, performance-approach, and performance-avoidance. Conceptual and empirical work by Elliot and Church and by VandeWalle demonstrated that the factor structure of goal orientation lends itself to three distinct dimensions.

Matrix of orientations
Orientation	Approach or Prove	Avoidance
Mastery	A mastery-approach orientation describes individuals who are focused on learning as much as possible, overcoming challenges through hard work, or increasing their competence at a task.	A mastery-avoidance orientation describes individuals who want to avoid doing worse than they have done before or failing to learn as much as possible.
Performance	A performance-approach orientation describes individuals who want to demonstrate and prove to others their high ability. Similarly, a prove performance orientation focuses on demonstrating performance to prove competence	A performance-avoidance orientation describes individuals who strive to avoid looking incompetent or less able than their peers by cultivating an appearance of effortless achievement.

=== Mastery orientation ===
A mastery orientation is characterized by the belief that success is the result of effort and use of the appropriate strategies. Mastery oriented individuals strive to develop their understanding and competence at a task by exerting a high level of effort. Across numerous studies, mastery orientation has been shown to promote adaptive patterns of learning, which ultimately lead to high academic achievement and adjustment. For example, students with a mastery orientation are more intrinsically motivated to learn, use deeper cognitive strategies, and persist through challenge and failure.

VandeWalle defines mastery orientation as the "desire to develop the self by acquiring new skills, mastering new situations, and improving one's competence". Persons with mastery orientation seek feedback on past performance to evaluate current performance. These individuals focus on improving skills and acquiring knowledge, and are less concerned with making mistakes. Research shows that the adoption of mastery goals leads to greater intrinsic motivation as opposed to performance approach or performance avoidance, which are associated with external motivation. One area where this can be important is in the area of curriculum design; when designing learning environments for students, it is important to create opportunities that promote learning goals as opposed to performance goals. One possible implication for educators is the need to emphasize knowledge-centred classroom environments that encourage "doing with understanding".

==== Mastery-approach and mastery-avoidance ====
According to Elliot, mastery-approach goals "entail striving to develop one's skills and abilities, advance one's learning, understand the material, or complete or master a task". This type of mastery orientation is consistent with the way general mastery orientation has been conceptualized previously. Alternatively, mastery-avoidance goals "entail striving to avoid losing one's skills and abilities (or having their development stagnate), forgetting what one has learned, misunderstanding material, or leaving a task incomplete or unmastered". Individuals are likely to pursue mastery-avoidance goals when they feel that their skills or abilities are deteriorating. For example, an elderly individual may notice that their physical and mental capacity is declining, and as a result, may focus their goals on sustaining or improving these diminishing capacities.

The separation of mastery orientation into two categories is neither widely accepted nor substantially proven.

=== Performance orientation ===
A performance orientation is characterized by the belief that success is the result of superior ability and of surpassing one's peers. Performance oriented individuals desire to outperform others and demonstrate (validate) their ability. Performance orientation is predictive of negative affect, avoidance of challenge and poor achievement outcomes.

In 1997, VandeWalle proposed that goal orientation is better conceptualized as a three-factor model, dividing performance orientation into the dimensions of prove performance orientation and avoidant performance orientation. According to VandeWalle, Cron & Slocum, avoidant performance and prove performance orientation have different relationships with various outcome variables, which support the argument that a three-factor model should be used in place of the originally conceptualized two-factor model.

==== Prove performance ====
VandeWalle defines prove performance as the "desire to prove one's competence and to gain favorable judgments about it". It represents a desire to achieve a high level of performance. People with performance approach orientation seek positive reinforcement and feedback. These individuals do not want to put forth a lot of effort unless they will be positively evaluated and tend to avoid tasks where they may make mistakes and therefore be evaluated poorly.

==== Avoid performance ====
VandeWalle defines avoid performance as the "desire to avoid the disproving of one's competence and to avoid negative judgments about it". It represents a desire to avoid instances of low beliefs. People with avoid performance orientation focus on avoiding situations in which they will receive evaluations or risk demonstrating a lack of confidence. Individuals high in fear of failure are more likely to adopt avoid performance goals.

== State versus trait ==
There has been debate as to whether goal orientation should be operationalized as a state or as a trait. Throughout the goal orientation literature, there are inconsistencies about the conceptualization of the stability of the construct. For example, DeShon & Gillespie stated that goal orientation has been conceptualized as a trait, quasi-trait, and state. They assert that whether researchers conceptualize goal orientation as a trait or a state "depends on the breadth of the inference that the researcher is attempting to support". State goal orientation refers to the goal one has in a particular situation, and is similar to trait goal orientation in that it represents one's preference in an achievement situation.

However, state goal orientation is "specific to the task and context at hand". For example, VandeWalle, Cron & Slocum stated that goal orientation can be domain-specific, and said that it is possible for an individual to have a strong mastery orientation in their academic domain but not in their work domain. Trait goal orientation refers to the "consistent pattern of responses in achievement situations based on the individual's standing on goal orientation dimensions". This view of goal orientation treats the construct as a stable, individual difference characteristic.

Button, Mathieu, & Zajac take an integrative view of the construct, stating that goal orientation is best categorized as a relatively stable individual difference variable that can be influenced by situational and contextual characteristics. They found that when few situational cues are present, individuals adopt their dispositional goal orientations. However, when "dispositional goal orientations predispose individuals to adopt particular response patterns across situations, situational characteristics may cause them to adopt a different or less acute response pattern for a specific situation". Therefore, trait and state goal orientations interact, and both should be considered simultaneously.

=== Big Five personality characteristics ===
Researchers in personality have settled on the Big Five model as the best conceptualization of personality which defines personality in terms of five measures: openness to experience, neuroticism, extraversion, conscientiousness, and agreeableness. In a study by Zweig and Webster, the relationship between the Big Five and goal orientation was examined. They found that goal orientation and the Big Five are related yet distinct constructs. Personality factors combine to create people's various orientations toward learning and goals, which in turn predict the types of tasks they will engage in. In a meta-analysis by Payne et al., goal orientation was found to predict job performance better than the Big Five.

Learning orientation was found to be positively correlated with all five measures of personality with openness to experience and conscientiousness having the largest correlations. Proving good performance was uncorrelated with all aspect of personality, apart from a negative correlation with neuroticism.

== Influences ==
Many studies have examined relationships between goal orientation and various antecedents (factors which predict the presence of goal orientation). These antecedents have been identified to have varying levels of importance. In a meta-analysis by Payne et al., both the need for achievement and the Big Five personality traits were identified as important antecedents of goal orientation, while cognitive ability was found to have almost no relationship with goal orientation.

=== Age ===
Age is a significant factor in predicting an individual's goal orientation, with younger individuals more likely to adopt a mastery orientation. Beginning at the transition to middle school, students tend to exhibit a performance orientation, along with an overall decline in academic motivation across adolescence. This follows the developmental propensity to view intelligence as a fixed characteristic in adulthood.

=== Gender ===
Supporting the gender disparities in STEM fields, previous research has suggested that females develop a motivational orientation that is maladaptive to high academic achievement, particularly in math and science. However, overall, the research examining gender differences in goal orientation has been conflicting. Research by Dweck has shown gender differences with females being more extrinsic or performance oriented. On the other hand, other studies have found that females are more likely to be mastery oriented, while males are more likely to hold performance orientations.

Despite the lack of uniformity among research findings, there is a general consensus that gender influences the development of different rationales and motivations for behavior, as a result of unique socialization expectations and experiences. These differences then affect the way students approach learning situations, leading to gender-related differences in goal orientations. Although several studies have hypothesized this effect, there is a lack of conclusive evidence, which warrants further exploration into gender differences among individuals' goal orientations

=== Parents and peers ===
Social influences, particularly parents and peers, affect the goal orientation of students. During early and middle childhood, the goal beliefs, attitudes and expectations of a child's parents carries significant weight in determining his or her goal orientation. As children transition to middle school, fitting in with one's peers becomes high priority. Peers influence goal orientation because children adopt academic goals and beliefs consistent with the dominant social norms. Adolescents with friends having high academic aspirations tend to have fewer problems academically.

=== Implicit theories of intelligence ===
Research has produced mixed results when examining the relationship between cognitive ability - such as intelligence - and goal orientation. For example, Eison found that mastery-oriented students had higher levels of cognitive ability than grade-oriented (performance-oriented) students. However, Dweck and her colleagues were unable to find any relationship between the constructs. Although findings are mixed, "a substantial body of theory and research suggests motivational and ability traits are generally uncorrelated". In a meta-analysis by Payne et al., cognitive ability and goal orientation were found to be independent constructs. Accordingly, individuals with high cognitive ability are equally likely to hold learning, prove performance, and avoid performance orientations. These authors also found that mastery orientation predicted job performance above and beyond cognitive ability. Based on this research, goal orientation, rather than cognitive ability, serves as a useful tool for practitioners to use to predict job performance.

Epistemological beliefs of intelligence and cognitive ability refer to an individual's belief about the nature of intellectual ability. Specifically, it is whether they believe that intelligence is a fixed characteristic, or a malleable quality. Individuals conceptions of intelligence have been shown to influence cognitive and motivational factors associated with goal orientation and ultimately academic performance.

==== Entity ====
If an individual has an entity (also referred to as "fixed") view of intelligence, they believe that intelligence is an unchanging characteristic and are more likely to think effort plays little to no role in outcome. In other words, you are either smart, or you are not. This is particularly maladaptive in academia. Students believe that effort is unnecessary because if you are smart, everything should come easy, and if you are not smart, hard work cannot compensate for this deficiency. Students with an entity view of intelligence are more likely to develop a fear of failure, resulting in the avoidance of "intellectual tasks," and giving up in the face of difficulty. The rationale is that if you are smart, effort is unnecessary, and if you are not, there is nothing you can do to change this.

==== Incremental ====
In opposition to entity theory, individuals with an incremental (also referred to as "flexible," and "malleable") view of intelligence believe that intelligence is adjustable. The belief is that intelligence is the result of hard work and the use of the appropriate strategies. This is particularly adaptive because rather than giving up in the face of failure or challenge, those who endorse an incremental view of intelligence interpret these setbacks as inevitable for learning to take place. Because they are not worried that exertion of effort is a reflection of lack of intelligence, they are not afraid to work hard, resulting in an outperformance of their entity theory peers. Even after several years, the effect is consistent, such that students with an incremental view of intelligence academically outperform students who had an entity view of intelligence. This is a test. A replication has happened.

=== Need for achievement ===
The need for achievement refers to the degree to which an individual "maintains high standards" and "aspires to accomplish difficult tasks". Goal orientation dimensions have been conceptualized as manifestations of Atkinson's (1957) need for achievement and need to avoid failure competence-relevant motives. In a meta-analysis by Payne et al., they found that the need for achievement was positively correlated with achievement orientation, negatively associated with avoidant performance orientation, and unrelated to prove performance orientation. They also found that the need for achievement correlated more strongly with achievement orientation than conscientiousness. Although achievement orientation and the need for achievement were found to be strongly related, the findings demonstrate that achievement orientation is related to, but not synonymous with the need for achievement.

=== Mindsets ===
Mindset refers to an individual's belief about oneself and one's most basic qualities, such as talent, intelligence, and personality. Although the majority of research on mindsets has focused primarily on how they affect educational achievement, mindsets have also been shown to be influential in athletics, health and well-being, business and relationships.

==== Fixed mindsets ====
Fixed mindsets are characterized by the belief that one's basic qualities are fixed – as if genetically predetermined. Individuals with fixed mindsets believe that practice has no relationship to performance success, which has been shown to be maladaptive across domains.

==== Growth mindsets ====
Growth mindsets are characterized by the belief that talents and abilities are things that are developed through effort, practice and instruction. Individuals with growth mindsets feel that they control their success, rather than external forces, so they are better able to problem solve and persist through setbacks. Research has shown that growth mindsets foster a more positive attitude toward practice and learning, a desire for feedback, a greater ability to deal with setbacks, and significantly better performance over time.

Why foster a growth mindset in students?

In 2010, Dweck explained that when students view intelligence as something that develops over time they view challenging work as an opportunity to learn and grow. These students value effort and realize that "even geniuses have to work hard to develop their abilities and make their contributions". Students with this type of attitude are able to respond to obstacles, try new strategies and continue to learn and grow in many situations, which leads to higher achievement.

How to foster to a growth mindset in students

In order to foster a growth mindset, teachers need to encourage students to welcome challenges and view it as an opportunity to learn and grow . The following are a list of ways a teacher can create a culture of risk taking:

- Provide encouragement: praise students for their perseverance, strategies and the choices they made, rather than being told they are 'smart' as it tells students that what they did has led them to success and can be used again to be successful in the future
- Emphasize that the deepest and best learning takes time: "…portray challenges as fun and exciting and easy tasks as boring and less useful for the brain". Students who work hard and value effort in the learning process will be able to develop their abilities on a deeper level.
- Illustrate growth: provide students with opportunities to write about, and share with one another, something that they used to struggle with and are now good at doing. This allows students to notice their own successes, which motivates their learning.
- Instructional structures: Design classrooms that combine high-quality instruction, clear goals, and ongoing support. This allows students to encounter growth-oriented messages through daily learning experiences, which promotes long-term engagement and resilience.

Long-term success of growth mindset

Designing and presenting learning tasks that foster a growth mindset in students, leads to long-term success. Growth mindsets promote a love of learning and highlight progress and effort. Teachers that illustrate meaningful work help students gain the tools they need to find confidence in their learning and be successful in future challenges.

=== Praise ===
One factor that has been shown to be influential in the development of goal orientations is the type of praise given to individuals. Type of praise not only affects behaviors, beliefs, emotions and outcomes immediately after it is imparted, but has also been shown to have long term consequences. Specifically, it affects how individuals deal with future difficulties and their willingness to apply effort to challenges that may come their way. Verbal praise is often administered as a way to reinforce the performance or behavior of individuals and although there may be positive intentions, some types of praise can have debilitating implications for the recipient. The specific distinction lies in what the praise is directed towards.

Process praise is focused on the actions taken by the individual, especially their effort and problem solving strategies, such as "Great job! You're working really hard." Process praise reinforces the association between success and effort (or behavior) rather than a fixed ability, which cultivates the more adaptive mastery orientation and incremental view of intelligence.

Person praise is focused on the individual themselves, similar to an affirmation of self-worth, such as, "Wow, you're so smart." Because it applauds the individual by applying a label or an unchangeable characteristic, person praise promotes a performance orientation and a fixed view of intelligence. Students are being rewarded, through praise, for their performance based on their ability. Children who are given person praise tend to have worse task performance, more low-ability attributions, report less task enjoyment and exhibit less task persistence, than children who are given process praise. Additionally, person praise is more likely to promote helpless responses to subsequent failures than process praise.

Although praise for intelligence is usually well-intentioned, and can be motivating when students are doing well, it backfires when students eventually face work that is difficult for them. When this happens, the failure is a threat to the person's sense of his or her own intelligence—a situation to avoid. Thus, praise for intelligence is a short-term strategy that makes successful students feel good at the moment, but one that is detrimental to students in the longer run.

== Goal setting ==
Historically, goal-setting theory has primarily been concerned with performance goals. Locke and Latham summarize 25 years of goal setting research by stating that as long as an individual is committed to a goal and has the ability to achieve it, specific, hard goals lead to a higher level of task performance than vague or easy goals. However, the vast majority of goal setting studies have been conducted with a specific performance goal. Studies in laboratory settings gave subjects fairly simple tasks. It is possible that when tasks are more complex or require a long-term commitment, adopting a goal may lead to higher performance. Fan et al. found that the relationship between trait mastery orientation and goal-setting was moderated by self-efficacy such that individuals high in mastery orientation and self-efficacy set higher goals that those high in mastery orientation but low in self-efficacy, which suggests that, while mastery orientation can influence goal setting, the relationship also depends on other factors such as the individual's level of self-efficacy. They also found that learning and prove goal orientations facilitated striving for challenges, suggesting that either orientation can effectively facilitate motivation for goal attainment.

Another factor to consider when examining the relationship between goal orientation and goal setting is the level of inherent complexity in the situation or task. In situations with more complex tasks, "do your best" goals may lead to higher performance than specific goals. It is possible that in complex tasks, a specific, difficult goal imposes greater cognitive demands on employees, making it difficult for them to learn the complex task due to this increased pressure. Kanfer and Ackerman found that in an air traffic controller simulation (a highly complex task), performance-outcome goals interfered with acquiring the knowledge necessary to perform the task, and individuals performed better when they were asked to do their best, suggesting that adopting a mastery orientation may be appropriate for complex tasks or in specific settings. However, it may be possible to set a specific, difficult learning goal. Latham and Brown found that when MBA students set specific, difficult learning goals such as mastering complex course material, they outperformed MBA students who set a performance goal for their grades. Locke and Latham claim that creating a specific, difficult learning goal in this type of situation facilitates meta-cognition which is particularly helpful in complex environments with limited guidance, such as in an MBA program.

== Correlates ==
The goal orientation literature has examined the relationships among goal orientation and various proximal (e.g., self-efficacy, metacognition, & feedback-seeking) and distal consequences (e.g., academic outcomes, organizational outcomes). In a meta-analysis by Payne et al., the goal orientation dimensions were found to be more strongly related to the self-regulatory constructs (i.e., self-efficacy, metacognition, & feedback-seeking) than the performance constructs (i.e. academic and organizational performance). They also found that avoidant performance orientation was the only dimension negatively related to the various outcomes. Payne et al. found that the learning strategies (including metacognition) and self-efficacy are the most important proximal consequences of goal orientation followed by feedback-seeking, academic outcomes, and organizational outcomes.

In their review of the goal orientation literature, Vandewalle, Nerstad, and Dysvik strongly advocated that the relationship of goal orientation with an outcome variable such as task performance should be assessed in conjunction with moderator variables such as self-efficacy, commitment, and feedback on prior task performance.

=== Self-efficacy ===
Bandura (1982) defined self-efficacy as "a belief in one's ability to effectively perform and to exercise influence over events". Individuals with high self-efficacy set more difficult goals exert more effort to achieve those goals, and seek to learn from the processes of pursuing those goals. In a meta-analysis by Payne et al., self-efficacy was identified as a proximal outcome of goal orientation. Similarly, VandeWalle, Cron & Slocum found that mastery orientation was positively related to self-efficacy, effort, and goal setting level. Since "self-efficacy functions as a primary motivational mechanism by which goal orientation influences subsequent learning processes", employees with higher levels of self-efficacy were found to exert more effort toward and learn more from task assignments.

=== Metacognition ===
Metacognition is conceptualized as an individual's knowledge and regulation over one's own cognition. Individuals high in metacognitive awareness are skilled at monitoring their progress towards goals, identifying their strengths and weaknesses, and adjusting their learning strategies accordingly to achieve favorable outcomes. Although there have been relatively few research studies conducted on the role of metacognition in leader development outcomes, some studies have found that metacognition plays an important role in such outcomes. For example, Ford et al. linked mastery orientation and metacognitive activity and found that metacognitive activity was significantly related to knowledge acquisition, post-training performance, and self-efficacy. In a study by Schmidt & Ford, metacognitive activity was positively related to mastery orientation as well as cognitive, affective, and skill-based learning outcomes. Similarly, Bell and Kozlowski found that mastery orientation was significantly related to the metacognitive activity. The National Research Council states that it is important to remember that metacognitive skills can be taught and essential that teachers explicitly teach metacognitive skills across the curriculum in a variety of subject areas.

=== Feedback seeking and interpretation ===
In an organizational context, the extent to which employees actively seek feedback can positively influence job performance. Goal orientation influences how individuals evaluate the costs and benefits of feedback-seeking opportunities. According to VandeWalle, when individuals have the opportunity to seek feedback, they face a cognitive dilemma between the need for self-assessment and the need for self-enhancement. Since individuals with a mastery orientation are interested in developing competencies, they are more likely to interpret feedback positively, engage in more feedback-seeking behaviors to enhance performance, and interpret feedback as valuable information about how to correct errors and improve future performance on a given task. Conversely, individuals with a performance orientation are likely to interpret feedback as "evaluative and judgmental information about the self", and as a result, are less likely to seek feedback. Consequently, individuals with high levels of mastery orientation are more inclined to seek feedback, while individuals with high levels of prove performance or avoid performance orientation are less inclined to seek feedback.

=== Academic outcomes ===
Goal orientations play a critical role in explaining academic performance. An individual's goal orientation has a significant impact on his or her cultivation of new skills, and thus has important implications for educators. Classroom environments that foster comparison between students lead those students to develop performance-oriented attitudes toward education. Specifically, learning in a competitive environment leads students to become more performance oriented and more likely to sacrifice learning opportunities to be positively evaluated. Conversely, a non-competitive, collaborative environment allows students to value learning rather than immediate performance success.

Because goal orientation refers to individuals' behavioral tendencies in achievement-oriented tasks, it is intuitive to associate goal orientation with various academic outcomes. According to Payne et al., mastery orientation is positively associated with self-regulatory behaviors such as planning and goal setting, which in turn are associated with academic performance. Therefore, individuals with high levels of mastery orientation are more likely to perform well on academic tasks than individuals with high levels of the performance orientation dimensions. Research has also shown that students' motivation can predict both the quality of the engagement in academic learning as well as the degree to which they seek out or avoid challenging situations. "Goal-setting is a technique that is often employed in the organization as part of traditional performance appraisals and broader performance management interventions." Long et al. assert that if all students are to move "through the increasing challenges and academic rigors" of school, then their motivation to learn must be identified and nurtured.

=== Organizational outcomes ===
Goal orientation has also been linked to organizational outcomes, specifically job performance. Payne et al. found that individuals with high levels of trait and state achievement orientation and low levels of trait avoidant performance orientation had better job performance, prove performance orientation was unrelated to performance, and achievement orientation predicted job performance more accurately than both cognitive ability and the Big Five personality characteristics. Their findings suggest that achievement orientation is a valuable predictor of job performance and it may be in the best interest of organizations to create a climate in which learning is valued over performance.

In a study by VandeWalle, Cron & Slocum, the authors found that individuals with a mastery orientation had higher sales performance than those with performance orientations, which suggests that in order to be successful in an organizational setting, individuals must have the desire to develop their skills. Another performance construct that has been examined is adaptive performance or performance adaptation. According to a meta-analysis, goal orientation is relevant when predicting subjective (e.g., self-reported) rather than objective adaptive performance (e.g., task outcomes).

=== Learning environments ===
Research (primarily centered on school and job performance outcomes) has shown that goal orientation is linked to outcomes and performance. When examining research on learning environments and curriculum design, one could argue that there is a significant alignment with mastery orientation and ideal learning environments. The National Research Council recommends that when designing learning environments, there are three essential principles—as outlined in its 2000 report "How People Learn: Brain Mind Experience, and School"—that should be upheld:

1. Classrooms and schools should be learner-centered. Teachers need to be aware of the strengths, skills, attitudes, and knowledge that students bring with them when they enter school, which can include acknowledging cultural differences and creating a place for the inclusion of their everyday lived experiences in the classroom.
2. Teachers should strive to create a knowledge-centered classroom by focusing on what is taught, why it is taught, and what competence or mastery looks like. Emphasis should be placed on learning with understanding. One way students can demonstrate this understanding is by successfully transferring content and skills to new situations and problems, which relates to metacognitive skills, which are linked to mastery orientation.
3. Educators should consider the environment in which learning takes place, and create an environment that nurtures a mastery orientation instead of a performance orientation. This means encouraging a community of learners who are willing to take risks and make mistakes for the sake of learning. Teachers should create environments that emphasize mastery over performance. Performance is primarily focused on learning in the moment and a demarcated demonstration of understanding. Mastery implies skill development over a period of time that includes experience and practice.

== See also ==
- Career and Life Planning Education
- GQM (Goal-question-metric)
