= Regulatory focus theory =

Questionnaire designed to measure prevention focus and promotion focus

Regulatory focus theory (RFT) is a theory of goal pursuit formulated by Columbia University psychology professor and researcher E. Tory Higgins regarding people's motivations and perceptions in judgment and decision-making processes. RFT examines the relationship between the motivation of a person and how they go about achieving their goal. RFT posits two separate and independent self-regulatory orientations: prevention and promotion (Higgins, 1997).

This psychological theory, like many others, is applied in communication, specifically in the subfields of nonverbal communication and persuasion. Chronic regulatory focus is measured using the Regulatory Focus Questionnaire (Higgins et al., 2001) or the Regulatory Strength measure. Momentary regulatory focus can be primed or induced.

== Background ==
=== Regulatory fit theory ===
To understand RFT, it is important to understand another of E. Tory Higgins' theories: regulatory fit theory. When a person believes that there is "fit", they will involve themselves more in what they are doing and "feel right" about it. Regulatory fit should not directly affect the hedonic occurrence of a thing or occasion, but should influence a person's assurance in their reaction to the object or event.

Regulatory fit theory suggests that a match between orientation to a goal and the means used to approach that goal produces a state of regulatory fit that creates a feeling of rightness about the goal pursuit and increases task engagement (Higgins, 2001, 2005). Regulatory fit intensifies responses, such as the value of a chosen object, persuasion, and job satisfaction.

Regulatory fit does not increase the assessment of a decision; instead when someone feels "right" about their decision, the experience of "correctness and importance" is transferred to the ensuing assessment of the chosen object, increasing its superficial worth. Research suggests that the "feeling right" experience can then sway retrospective or prospective evaluations. Regulatory fit can be manipulated incidentally (outside the context of interest) or integrally (within the context of interest).

=== Definition ===
RFT refers to when a person pursues a goal in a way that maintains the person's own personal values and beliefs, also known as regulatory orientation. This theory operates on the basic principle that people embrace pleasure but avoid pain, and they then maintain their regulatory fit based on this standard.

The regulatory focus is how someone approaches pleasure but avoids pain. An individual's regulatory focus concentrates on desired end-states, and the approach motivation used to go from the current state to the desired end-state. This theory differentiates between a promotion-focus on hopes and accomplishments, also known as gains. This focus is more concerned with higher level gains such as advancement and accomplishment.

Another focus is the prevention-focus based on safety and responsibilities, also known as non-losses. This focus emphasizes security and safety by following the guidelines and the rules.

These two regulatory focuses regulate the influences that a person would be exposed to in the decision-making process, and determine the different ways they achieve their goal, as discussed by RFT. An individual's regulatory orientation is not necessarily fixed. While individuals have chronic tendencies towards either promotion or prevention, these preferences may not hold for all situations. Furthermore, a specific regulatory focus can be induced.

Regulatory focus can also differ across regions and cultures. For example, a study using word use on social media found that northern wheat-farming regions used more promotion-related words than southern rice-farming regions. Researchers have also found that asking people to focus on group identities tends to put people in a prevention mindset, whereas asking people to focus on themselves tends to put them in a promotion mindset.

The value taken from interaction and goal attainment can be either positive or negative. The decision has positive value when people attempt to attain their goal in a way that fits their regulatory orientation and it will have negative value when people attempt to attain their goal in a way that does not fit their regulatory orientation. Regulatory fit allows value to be created by intensifying the commitment, based on one of the regulatory focus orientations. Making choices and fulfilling objectives are considered activities, and with any activity, people can be more or less involved. When this involvement is strong, it can intensify the feelings and values about this activity, and the approach to the activity determines whether they are or are not satisfied with the outcome and method of achieving the outcome.

This theory has noteworthy implications for increasing the value of life. For example, in interpersonal conflict, if each person experiences "fit", each one will be satisfied with and committed to the outcome. In the broad sense, for people to appreciate their own lives, they need to be satisfied and "feel right" about what they are doing, and the way they are doing it. If it is not satisfying, it is known as "non-fit", and they will not reach their desired goal.

=== Goal attainment and motivation ===
Regulatory focus theory, according to Higgins, views motivation in a way that allows an understanding of the foundational ways we approach a task or a goal. Different factors can motivate people during goal pursuit, and we self-regulate our methods and processes during our goal pursuit. RFT proposes that motivational strength is enhanced when the manner in which people work toward a goal sustains their regulatory orientation. Achieving a goal in a way that is consistent to a person's regulatory orientation leads to an individual sense of importance to the event. The impact of motivation is considered calculated and this creates a greater sense of commitment to the goal. The more strongly an individual is engaged (i.e., involved, occupied, fully engrossed) in an activity, the more intense the motivational force experienced. Engagement is of great importance to attain and motivate in order to reach a goal. Engagement serves as intensifier of the directional component of the value experience. An individual who is strongly engaged in a goal pursuits will experience a positive target more positively and a negative target more negatively.

Individuals can pursue different goals with diverse regulatory orientations and in unlike ways. There are two different kinds of regulatory orientations that people use to obtain their goals: promotion-focus orientation and prevention-focus orientation. These terms are derived from E. Tory Higgins's Theory of Regulatory Focus. In which, he adds to the notion that people regulate their goal-oriented behavior in two very distinct ways, coined promotion-focus orientation and prevention-focus orientation

E. Tory Higgins uses this example: there is Student A and Student B, and they both have the shared goal to make an A in a class they are both taking in college. Student A uses a promotion-focus orientation which slants them towards achieving their goal and towards advancement, growth and life accomplishment. This would cause Student A to view the goal as an ideal that satisfies their need for accomplishment. Student B uses a prevention-focus orientation where the goal is something that should be realized because it fulfills their need for security, protection and prevention of negative outcomes. Student A uses an eager approach where they read extra materials to obtain their goal of an A. Student B uses a vigilant approach where they become more detail oriented and pay careful attention to completing all of the course requirements.

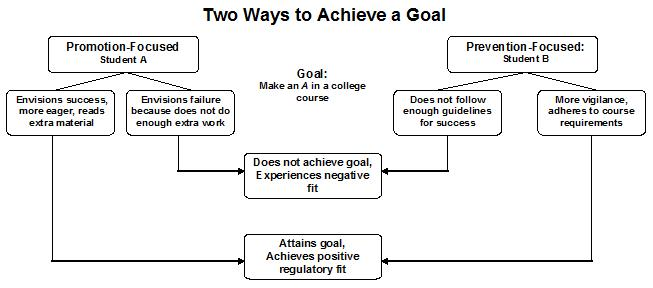

Both forms of regulatory orientation can work to fulfill goals, but the choice of orientation is based on individual preferences and style. When a person pursues their goal in the focus that fits their regulatory orientation, they are more likely to pursue their goal more eagerly and aggressively than if they were using the other focus. In this case each student has different styles. They both feel more comfortable in persuading their goal. The outcome in this experiment would have been different if the students were given an undesirable choice.

When people make decisions, they often envision the possible "pleasure or pain" of the possible outcomes that the focus orientation will produce. A person imagining making a pleasing choice is more likely to engage in promotion-focus orientation because envisioning the possible outcome of success maintains eagerness about the outcome but does not place importance on vigilance. A person imagining the possible pain by making an undesirable choice maintains more vigilance but less eagerness.

A person with promotion-focus orientation is more likely to remember the occasions where the goal is pursued by using eagerness approaches and less likely to remember occasions where the goal is pursued by vigilance approaches. A person with prevention-focus orientation is more likely to remember events where the goal is pursued by means of vigilance than if it was pursued using eagerness approaches.

== Application ==
=== Regulatory focus theory and persuasion ===
When relating regulatory focus theory to persuasion, it is important to remember that RFT is a goal-attainment theory, and that RFT can spawn feelings of rightness/wrongness which in turn may produce formulations for judgments.

The feelings of rightness give an individual more commitment to the information coming in and therefore can avoid endangering their regulatory fit which in turn changes their regulatory focus and accepting a probable motive to change. If a person experiences feelings of wrongness they will suffer negative emotions and deem the experience and information as a threat to their regulatory fit and therefore a threat to their regulatory focus and their goal.

Studies have been done where fit and focus have been applied to show their applicability to consumer purchasing, health advisories, and social policy issues. To be persuaded is to change your prior feelings, actions, and/or beliefs on a matter to where you agree with the persuader.

The "fit" involved in RFT plays a large role in such issues and stories because it can be a device to help an individual receive and review the experience during a particular message delivery. Positive reinforcement and feelings of rightness while decoding the message creates a stronger engagement and relationship with processing the message, and negative reinforcement and feelings of wrongness lessens the engagement and attachment.

Researchers found that targeting the two different regulatory focus orientations, and their coinciding types of fit, works as an effective process to aid in persuasive charm or pull when they introduced a manner of persuasion where the framing of the message was everything and the content was irrelevant to uphold or interrupt a person's regulatory fit and follow the pattern of logic used in regulatory orientation.

Lee and Aaker (2004) conducted an experiment that involved whether or not to give their information in a prevention-focus- or promotion-focus-concerning way. The study involved an advertisement for a grape juice drink, which they split into two to create prevention-focus concerns (disease-preventing) and then promotion-focus concerns (energy enhancement). In doing so, they demonstrated that rather than trying to know each individual recipient's qualities, one needs only to start by nailing the focus (prevention/promotion) and then framing the message so that it creates that "rightness".

Some may confuse RFT with regulatory fit, regulatory relevance, message matching, and source attractiveness in such an example. The extent of similarities between closely related theories of RFT, such as ones stated above, make it hard to clarify when this theory is applicable or apparent in respect to the persuasion process.

=== Regulatory focus theory and nonverbal communication ===
RFT can be a useful outline for a better understanding of the effects of nonverbal cues in persuasion and impression formation. Regulatory Fit Theory suggests that the effect of a cue cannot be understood without remembering what the cue means given a recipient's focus orientation.

Nonverbal cues can be used by the message source to vary delivery style, more specifically to convey eagerness or vigilance, of a given message in a way that will produce regulatory fit in message recipients of different focus orientations.

Advancement implies eager movement forward, so eagerness is conveyed by gestures that involve animated, broad opening movements such as hand movements projecting outward, forward leaning body positions, fast body movement, and fast speech rate. Caution implies vigilant carefulness, so vigilance should be conveyed by gestures that show precision like slightly backward-leaning body positions, slower body movement, and slower speech rate.

An eager nonverbal delivery style will result in greater message effectiveness for promotion-focus recipients than for prevention-focus recipients, while the opposite is true for a vigilant nonverbal style.

There are various aspects, which may contribute to whether or not a message's persuasive element is successful. One aspect is the effect of nonverbal cues and their association with persuasive appeals based on the message recipient's motivational regulatory orientation. This determines the recipient's impression of the source during impression formation.

Research has found that nonverbal cues are an essential element of most persuasive appeals. RFT creates the background that allows a prediction for when and for whom a nonverbal cue can have an effect on persuasion. When nonverbal cues and signals are used appropriately, they increase the effectiveness of persuasion.

=== Moral judgment ===
RFT has also been applied within moral psychology to the topic of moral judgment, contrasting the notions of "oughts" and "ideals."

== Sources ==
- Avnet, T., & Higgins, E. (2003, September). Locomotion, assessment, and regulatory fit: Value transfer from "how" to "what". Journal of Experimental Social Psychology, 39(5), 525. Retrieved April 10, 2009, doi:10.1016/S0022-1031(03)00027-1
- Cesario, Joseph; Higgins, E. Tory (2008). "Making message recipients 'feel right': How nonverbal cues can increase persuasion" (PDF). Psychological Science. 19 (5): 415–420. doi:10.1111/j.1467-9280.2008.02102.x. ISSN 0956-7976. ResearchGate 5386086.
- Cesario, J., Higgins, E., & Scholer, A. (2008, January). Regulatory fit and persuasion: Basic principles and remaining questions. Social and Personality Psychology Compass, 2(1), 444–463. Retrieved April 10, 2009, from PsycINFO database
- Higgins, E. (1997, December). Beyond pleasure and pain. American Psychologist, 52(12), 1280–1300. Retrieved April 10, 2009, doi:10.1037/0003-066X.52.12.1280
- Higgins, E. (2000, November). Making a good decision: Value from fit. American Psychologist, 55(11), 1217–1230. Retrieved April 10, 2009, doi:10.1037/0003-066X.55.11.1217
- Higgins, E. "Value From Regulatory Fit." American Psychological Society 14 (2005): 209–13.
- Higgins, E., Friedman, R., Harlow, R., Idson, L., Ayduk, O., & Taylor, A. (2001, January). Achievement orientations from subjective histories of success: Promotion pride versus prevention pride. European Journal of Social Psychology, 31(1), 3–23. Retrieved April 10, 2009, from Academic Search Elite database.
- Higgins, E., Idson, L., Freitas, A., Spiegel, S., & Molden, D. (2003, June). Transfer of value from fit. Journal of Personality and Social Psychology, 84(6), 1140–1153. Retrieved April 10, 2009, doi:10.1037/0022-3514.84.6.1140
- Spiegel, S., Grant-Pillow, H., & Higgins, E.(2004, January). How regulatory fit enhances motivational strength during goal pursuit. European Journal of Social Psychology, 34(1), 39–54. Retrieved April 10, 2009, .
- Vaughn, Leigh Ann, Sarah J. Hesse, Zhivka Petkova, and Lindsay Trudeau. ""This story is right on": The impact of regulatory fit on narrative engagement and persuasion." 4 Oct. 2008. Wiley InterScience. Journals. University of Oklahoma Library, Norman. 9 Apr. 2009

== External links and further reading ==
- HigginsLab: An overview, with additional reading suggestions, for E. Tory Higgins' theories
- Understanding Regulatory Fit: A look from a marketing perspective
- Counterfactual thinking and regulatory focus and fit: Application of Regulatory Focus and Regulatory Fit to Counterfactual Thinking
- Recasting Goal Setting in Negotiation: A Regulatory Focus Perspective
