= Victor Basili =

American computer scientist

- Born: May 30, 1940 (age 86); Brooklyn, New York, US

Academic background
- Education: Fordham College; Syracuse University; University of Texas at Austin
- Thesis: A Semantic Model for Programs (1970)
- Doctoral advisor: Terrence Wendall Pratt

Academic work
- Institutions: Providence College; University of Maryland, College Park

Victor Robert Basili (born 13 April 1940), is an emeritus professor at the Department of Computer Science, which is part of the University of Maryland College of Computer, Mathematical, and Natural Sciences, and the Institute for Advanced Computer Studies. He is well known for his works on measuring, evaluating, and improving the software development process, as a pioneer of empirical software engineering, especially through his papers on the Goal/Question/Metric Approach, the Quality Improvement Paradigm, and the Experience Factory.

== Life and career ==
Basili was born in Brooklyn, New York and studied at Fordham College (now Fordham University), where he received a BS in mathematics in 1961. He went on to obtain an MS in mathematics from Syracuse University in 1963. From 1963 to 1967, Basili worked at Providence College, where he was first an instructor before becoming an assistant professor. He returned to graduate studies and obtained a Ph.D. in computer science from the University of Texas at Austin in 1970, under the supervision of Terrence Wendall Pratt. Basili then joined University of Maryland, College Park as an assistant professor just after graduation in 1970. He became an associate professor there in 1975, and a professor there in 1982. From 1982 through 1988 he was chair of the Department of Computer Science at the University of Maryland, College Park. He is currently a senior research fellow at the Fraunhofer Center for Experimental Software Engineering – Maryland and from 1997 to 2004 was its executive director.

Basili developed many of his ideas in empirical software engineering through his affiliation with the NASA Goddard Space Flight Center Software Engineering Laboratory (SEL), which he helped to create and was one of its directors from 1976 through 2002.

Basili received the ACM SIGSOFT Outstanding Research Award in 2000. He is a fellow of both the Association for Computing Machinery (ACM) and of the Institute of Electrical and Electronics Engineers (IEEE).
