= Goal pursuit =

Goal pursuit is the process of attempting to achieve a desired future outcome. This generally follows goal setting, the process of forming these desires.

== Definition ==
Gollwitzer and Brandstatter (1997) define four phases of goal pursuit as

- predecisional ("setting preferences between concurring wishes and desires"),
- preactional ("promoting the initiation of goal-directed actions"),
- actional ("bringing goal-directed actions to a successful ending"), and
- postactional ("evaluating what has been achieved as compared to what was desired").

== Research ==
This article overviews literature on motivation and persistence to accomplish a goal once goal activities have begun (i.e. the actional phase), with specific applications to the field of marketing and consumer behavior.

=== Motivation ===
==== Goal Gradient Hypothesis ====
Goal progress is a measure of advancement toward accomplishment of a goal. Perceptions of progress often impact human motivation to pursue a goal. Hull (1932, 1934) developed the goal gradient hypothesis, which posits that motivation to accomplish a goal increases monotonically from the goal initiation state to the goal ending state. Hull developed the goal gradient hypothesis when observing rats racing to receive a food reward (Hull, 1932). Using sensors to assess the rat's motion, Hull observed that the rats level of effort increased as the proximal distance to the food reward decreased. The goal gradient hypothesis has been used to predict human behavior when pursuing a goal.

Applying the goal gradient hypothesis to analysis of consumer rewards or loyalty programs, marketing researchers developed the endowed progress effect and illusionary progress effect. First, Nunes and Drèze (2006) developed the endowed progress effect, which posits that endowing a consumer with some measure of artificial progress toward a given goal can subsequently increase the consumer's motivation to complete the goal, leading to faster and higher levels of goal attainment compared to consumers who have not received an endowment. As applied to rewards or loyalty programs, consumers with endowed progress were shown to have a higher likelihood of reward redemption compared to those not endowed, and they completed the reward task more quickly than the non-endowed.

To demonstrate this effect, in conjunction with a professional car wash, Nunes and Drèze (2006) conducted a field experiment where they distributed 300 loyalty cards to car wash patrons. For each car wash purchased, cardholders received a stamp on their cards. Half of the cards required ten stamps to receive the reward (a free car wash), but these cards were endowed with two stamps – therefore, these patrons only required eight additional stamps to receive a free car wash. The other half of the cards were non-endowed, and patrons only required eight stamps to receive a free car wash. The authors found that the average time between car washes (i.e. interpurchase time) for patrons with the endowed cards was less than the interpurchase time for patrons with the non-endowed cards. Additionally, the redemption rate for endowed cards (i.e. those cards completed and submitted to receive a free car wash) was statistically higher than the redemption rate of non-endowed cards at 34% compared to 19%, respectively.

Second, Kivetz, Urminsky, and Zheng (2006) had a similar finding: the illusionary progress effect. They found evidence that providing an illusion of goal progress accelerates the rate of goal achievement (i.e. reduced intervisit times for a rewards program) and increases retention in the rewards program. They developed the goal-distance model that asserts that "investment" in goal pursuit is inversely proportional to the psychological distance between requirements received in pursuit of the reward and the total number of requirements needed to achieve the reward.

==== Psychophysics Perspective ====
Bonezzi et al. (2011) propose a motivation gradient for goal pursuit that is contingent on perceptions of goal progress from a reference point: either the initial state or the end state of the goal. This proposed psychophysics model of goal pursuit purports that (1) when the initial state of a goal is the reference point, motivation levels monotonically decrease as distance from the initial state increases and (2) when the end state of a goal is the reference point, motivation levels monotonically increase as distance to the end state decreases. When proposing the U-shaped goal gradient, Bonezzi et al. (2011) argue that the perceived marginal value of progress when pursuing a goal is greatest at the goal initial state and the goal end state. This perception of marginal value drives motivation; hence, motivation is highest at the initial and end state of the goal.

The psychophysics model incorporates framing effects – asserting that the manner in which a goal is framed impacts perceptions of progress during goal pursuit. Perceptions of progress subsequently impact the level of effort exerted during various steps during goal pursuit. Progress measured from a goal's initial state is referred to as a "to-date" frame and progress measured from a goal's end state is referred to as a "to-go" frame (Bonezzi et al., 2011). In an experiment run with undergraduate student participants, Bonezzi et al. (2011) gave participants $15 to donate to a charity with a goal of $300 total donations. Participants were put into two groups: a to-date group and a to-go group. In the to-date condition, money that the charity had collected toward its goal was framed as money already collected. In the to-go condition, progress in reaching the $300 goal was framed as money left to collect to reach the goal. Consistent with the psychophysics model, Bonezzi et al. (2011) found that the rate of donations by participants in the to-date group was highest during the early stages of the goal and the rate of donation by participants in the to-go group was highest during the late stages of the goal.

==== Regulatory Focus ====
Higgins’ theory of regulatory fit (see Regulatory focus theory) asserts that individuals whose regulatory focus (either a prevention or promotion orientation) aligns with their approach to goal pursuit will demonstrate greater levels of motivation to complete the goal compared to individuals whose approach to goal pursuit is incongruent with their regulatory focus (Spiegel, Grand-Pillow, & Higgins, 2004). Consequently, the former individuals, with aligned focus and approach, are more likely to accomplish the goal. As an example, in a study run with undergraduate students at Columbia University, Spiegel et al. (2004) evaluated the regulatory focus, either promotion or prevention, of study participants. Participants were asked to complete a report writing task, and participants were requested to either complete the task using a vigilance perspective or an eagerness perspective. Eagerness is associated with a promotion focus (i.e. advancement toward a goal) and vigilance is associated with a prevention focus (i.e. securing a goal). Spiegel et al. found that study participants whose tasks were consistent with their regulatory focus (i.e. promotion/eagerness and prevention/vigilance) were more likely to complete the task compared to individuals whose regulatory focus was not consistent with the task's framing.

Fishbach & Dhar (2005) found that a self-regulatory focus on commitment during goal pursuit leads to actions consistent with goal achievement when goal progress is perceived; whereas a self-regulatory focus on progress during goal pursuit may lead to actions incongruent with goal achievement. Fishbach, Eyal, and Finkelstein (2010) extended this concept to predict behavior during goal pursuit when positive and negative feedback are received. They assert that individuals who are commitment focused are expected to pursue goal-congruent actions when receiving positive feedback, as this feedback serves as evidence of their commitment to the goal; whereas progress-focused individuals perceive the same positive feedback as evidence of sufficient progress toward goal attainment and may subsequently pursue actions incongruent with goal achievement. On the other hand, commitment-focused individuals would perceive negative feedback as evidence of their lack of commitment to the goal and would subsequently pursue actions incongruent with goal achievement; whereas the progress-focused individuals perceive negative feedback as an indication of their lack of goal progress and would subsequently pursue goal-congruent actions.

Fishback et al. (2010) provide the following example,

“…a student who receives a high test score and infers that she likes math will work harder as a result, whereas a classmate who receives similar positive feedback and infers sufficient progress will relax his efforts and focus on spending time with [his] friends.”

==== Prospect Theory Perspective ====
Heath, Larrick, and Wu (1999) assert that motivation to pursue a goal can be explained using the principles of Prospect theory – specifically, those associated with the S-shaped value function. This values approach to motivation emphasizes the following characteristics:

- reference points,
- loss aversion, and
- diminishing sensitivity.

===== Reference Points =====
Heath et al. (1999) describe goals as reference points. Specifically, the goal serves as the reference point by which individuals psychologically differentiate between successes and failures. Using Prospect Theory terminology, successes are associated with gains and failures are associated with losses. For example, if a goal is set to lose 10 pounds, losing 11 pounds is a success but losing 9 pounds is a failure.

===== Loss Aversion =====
Heath et al. (1999) state that similar to decisions under uncertainty, loss aversion applies to goals. With goals, loss aversion implies that the negative affect evoked from performing worse than one's goal outweighs the positive affect associated with exceeding one's goal. For example, consider an individual has a goal of losing 10 pounds. If he misses his goal by losing only nine pounds, the magnitude of his negative emotions would be greater than the magnitude of his positive emotions if he exceeds his goal by losing 11 pounds.

===== Diminishing Sensitivity =====
Heath et al. (1999) assert that individuals' sensitivity to progress in goal pursuit diminishes as they move away from the goal reference point. Therefore, as an individual moves closer toward accomplishing her goal, the perceived value of progress increases. For example, consider a goal to run 10 miles and a separate goal to run 20 miles. If an individual runs one mile, the perceived value of this progress is greater when the goal reference point is 10 miles than when the reference point is 20 miles.

==== Subgoals ====
Using a values approach to goal pursuit, Heath et al. (1999) assert that proximal goals are more likely to result in successful outcomes. When a goal is proximal, value for each step of progress is greater than if the goal is distal given diminishing sensitivity. One way to transform a distal goal to a more proximal goal is to set subgoals. Therefore, Heath et al. (1999) assert that setting subgoals is an effective strategy to motivate successful goal pursuit.

On the other hand, Amir and Ariely (2008) posit that discrete progress markers (DPMs) or subgoals may cause complacency and distract attention from the primary end goal. DPMs signal progress during goal pursuit. Consistent with Fishbach and Dhar (2005), Amir and Ariely (2008) propose that accomplishing a DPM may lead to less motivation to achieve a goal end state. DPMs can have negative consequences to goal pursuit when goal progress is certain – meaning when the distance, either temporal or spatial, to the goal end state is known. For example, progress when completing a marathon has high certainty because individuals know the exact distance from start to finish to complete the goal. On the other hand, when goal progress is uncertain, a DPM can serve as an indicator that goal pursuit is successful, which would lead to higher motivation to pursue the goal end state. Amir and Ariely (2008) describe courtship of a romantic interest as a goal with high progress uncertainty.

For goals with progress certainty, accomplishing a DPM may decrease total motivation to achieve the goal. Amir and Ariely (2008) assert that while approaching a DPM during goal pursuit, motivation to achieve the DPM increases. However, after the DPM is accomplished, motivation declines leading to "a state of complacency." The net result on total motivation to achieve the goal may be negative. Additionally, accomplishing a DPM for a goal with progress certainty, may serve as a distraction from the end goal. The perception of progress from achieving the DPM may lead to less focus on achieving the ultimate goal end state and more focus on competing goals. Hence, DPMs or subgoals may have overall negative effects on motivation during goal pursuit for goals with progress certainty.

=== Persistence ===
Fox and Hoffman (2002) propose a paradigm for persistence in goal pursuit. Their paradigm is an amalgam of Lewinian (see Kurt Lewin) and Atkinsonian (see John William Atkinson) theories coupled with other psychological theories. Fox and Hoffman (2002) leverage Lewinian concepts of tension and valence. Tension in goal pursuit arises when there is a discrepancy between one's current state and one's desired goal end state. The motivational force to close this discrepancy, and hence eliminate the tension, leads to persistence. Fox and Hoffman (2002) also leverage Atkinsonian concepts that equate persistence to conservation of momentum (a physics principle). Atkinson asserts that once a goal is initiated, efforts to complete the goal persistent unless "blunted by a strong external stimulus or by the arousal of an alternative, more forceful goal-directed tendency.”

Using these concepts, Fox and Hoffman (2002) propose four mechanisms for goal persistence:

- proximal closure,
- clarity completion,
- goal valence, and
- intrinsic interests.

==== Proximal Closure ====
Proximal closure posits that as the distance between a goal end state and an individual's current state decreases, the "attractive motive force" to reach the goal end state increases. The goal becomes more desirable and its completion more feasible. Additionally, as the proximal distance to the goal end state nears, the motivational force to complete the goal and objectives associated with it also increases.

==== Clarity of Completion ====
Clarity of completion suggests that as the steps to complete a goal become clearer, persistence to accomplish the goal increases. When the path to complete a goal is clearer, the goal is perceived to be more feasible, and subsequently, the motivation to complete the goal increases.

==== Goal Valence ====
For the goal valence mechanism, Fox and Hoffman (2002) describe valence as "the extent of attractiveness or desirability of the goal." Goals that are perceived to be very valuable, defined as those that meet the needs of the individual, are high valence. Goals with high positive valence are not easily substitutable, meaning they cannot be easily replaced by another goal. An individual is more likely to persist to complete a goal that cannot be substituted for another goal.

==== Intrinsic Interests ====
For the intrinsic interests' mechanism, Fox and Hoffman (2002) assert that during the pursuit of a primary goal, an individual may develop interests in activities or experiences associated with pursuing the goal. Hence, even if interest in the primary goal wanes, individuals may be motivated to persist toward goal completion so they can continue to engage in associated activities and experience that elicit positive affect.

Alternatively, sunk cost effects can lead to persistence in goal pursuit. Arkes and Blumer (1985) define sunk cost effects as "a greater tendency to continue an endeavor once an investment in money, effort, or time has been made." Therefore, once progress in goal pursuit is perceived, individuals may persist in goal pursuit as to not waste the time and effort already expended while pursuing the goal.

== See also ==
- Goal setting
