= Counterplan (Soviet planning) =

In the economy of the Soviet Union and other communist states of the Soviet Bloc, the counterplan (Russian: встречный план) was a plan put forth by workers of an enterprise (or its structural unit) to exceed the expectations of the state plan allocated for the enterprise/unit. It was an important part of the socialist competition.

According to the Great Soviet Encyclopedia, the idea of the counterplan was put forth by the workers of the Karl Marx Plant, Leningrad, in June 1930, during the first five-year plan.

Since the 1960s, counterplans, in the form of obligations as part of Socialist emulation, to execute state plans (annual, quarterly, monthly) ahead of schedule were common in the Soviet Union and other communist states.

Counterplanning was later incorporated into an incentive scheme that sought to reward managers for giving more accurate estimates of how much they could produce. While reducing the extent of the ratchet effect, the incentive scheme was still unable to eliminate the effect due to the multi-round nature of the game of production.
