= Quiet =

Quiet may refer to:

- Silence, a relative or total lack of sound

== In music ==
- The Quiett (born 1985), South Korean rapper
- Quiet (album), a 1996 John Scofield album
- "Quiet", a song by Lights, from her album The Listening (2009)
- "Quiet" (MILCK song), a 2017 song written for the 2017 Women's March in Washington, D.C.
- Quiet (EP), a 2007 EP by Jim Ward
- "Quiet" (This Will Destroy You song), 2006
- "Quiet" (Lil' Kim song), a song by Lil' Kim
- "Quiet", a song by Alien Ant Farm, from their 2003 albumTruant
- "Quiet", a song by Camila Cabello, from her album Familia (2022)
- "Quiet", a song by Demi Lovato, from her album Here We Go Again (2009)
- "Quiet", a song by The Smashing Pumpkins, from their album Siamese Dream (1993)
- "Quiet", a song by the Player Piano from their album Satellite (2007)
- "Quiet", a song by Royce da 5'9", from his album Layers (2016)
- The Quiet, an album by Bella Morte
- "Quiet", a song by Tim Minchin from the musical Matilda
- QUIET, a song by ELEVATION RHYTHM

== In religion ==
- Prayer of Quiet, a term from Christian theology relating to degrees of contemplation or contemplative prayer
- Quietism (Christian philosophy)
- Quiet Time

== Other ==
- Buy Quiet, an American health and safety initiative to select and purchase the lowest noise emitting power tools and machinery
- QUIET (abbreviation for "Q/U Imaging ExperimenT"), an astronomy experiment studying polarization of the cosmic microwave background radiation
- QUIET telescope, an instrument for use in the QUIET astronomy experiment
- Quiet: The Power of Introverts in a World That Can't Stop Talking, a 2012 non-fiction book about introversion by American author Susan Cain
- The Quiet, a 2005 American drama thriller film directed by Jamie Babbit
- Quiet game, a children's "game" where children must stay quiet and still, on fear of punishment
- Quiet (Metal Gear), a character in the videogame Metal Gear Solid V: The Phantom Pain
- "Quiet" (Casualty), a 1986 television episode

== See also ==
- Quiet American (disambiguation)
- Quiet Revolution (disambiguation)
- Silence (disambiguation)
