= Silenced =

Silenced may refer to:

== Films and television ==
- Silenced (2011 film), a South Korean drama film
- Silenced, a 2014 American documentary by James Spione
- Silenced, a 2023 British film by far-right activist Tommy Robinson
- Silenced (2026 film), an Australian documentary by Selina Miles
- "Silenced" (Hazbin Hotel), an episode of the second season of Hazbin Hotel

== Literature ==
- Silenced: China's Great Wall of Censorship, a 2006 book by Oystein Alme and Morten Vågen

== Music ==
- Silenced (album), a 2005 album by The Black Dog
- "Silenced", a song by Mudvayne from The End of All Things to Come

== See also ==
- Silence (disambiguation)
- Silent (disambiguation)
