= Quiet Power =

2016 book by Susan Cain, Gregory Mone and Erica Moroz

Quiet Power: The Secret Strengths of Introverts
- Author: Susan Cain, Gregory Mone, Erica Moroz
- Illustrator: Grant Snider
- Language: English
- Genre: Psychology, young adult, self-help, childhood education, parenting, interpersonal relations
- Publisher: Dial Books
- Publication date: May 3, 2016 (Hardcover)
- Publication place: United States
- Media type: Hardcover, Kindle Edition, Audible Audio
- Pages: 288 pages (hardcover)
- ISBN: 978-0-8037-4060-0
- Preceded by: Quiet: The Power of Introverts in a World That Can't Stop Talking
- Followed by: Bittersweet: How Sorrow and Longing Make Us Whole

Quiet Power: The Secret Strengths of Introverts is a 2016 non-fiction book written by Susan Cain with Gregory Mone and Erica Moroz, and illustrated by Grant Snider.

Quiet Power is an adaptation for children and teens, and for their educators and parents, of Cain's 2012 adult-audience book Quiet: The Power of Introverts in a World That Can't Stop Talking.

== Background ==
Susan Cain's 2012 book Quiet: The Power of Introverts in a World That Can't Stop Talking reached The New York Times best seller list and Time magazine's cover, and was the subject of one of the most-watched TED Talks. In 2015 Cain co-founded Quiet Revolution, a company that produces content, including online training courses for parents, about and for introverts. Quiet Power constitutes Cain's focus on introverted children and teens, especially in the context of schools, so that the next generation of introverts doesn't grow up feeling there is something wrong with them or repress their personality trait.

Cain's co-authors Erica Moroz and Gregory Mone are, respectively, a journalist and a writer of children's books; illustrator Grant Snider was discovered through his comics that were inspired by Cain's 2012 Quiet.

== Content ==
Quiet Power discusses the distinction between introversion and shyness; deeper student engagement versus conventional expectations of class participation; speaking in front of groups; individual versus group work; introvert-friendly methods of structuring group work; and use of social media in education. The book focuses on shyness in addition to introversion, saying that shyness involves fear of social judgment. Cain says that while shyness may be something to overcome, introversion can be something to celebrate, adding that introspection tends to come with "superpowers" such as listening ability, empathy, deeper study, and longer focus. The book includes chapters on school, socializing, hobbies, and home, and incorporates firsthand accounts of introverted teens and of famous figures who have succeeded outside of their initial comfort zones.

Cain included new research in Quiet Power that was not present in the adult-audience Quiet, and recast it especially for 10- to 14-year-olds who would be less able than high schoolers to translate the workplace-oriented Quiet into their own world. The book also includes appendices for teachers and parents.

Saying that adolescence is the hardest period in an introvert's life, Cain suggests that young introverts talk with others about their desired socializing style (to avoid misunderstandings), find activities about which they can be passionate (to motivate stepping outside their comfort zones), focus on their strengths (to remain true to themselves), and be open to extroverted people (as having complementary abilities).

Cain critiques schools' clustered desks, infatuation with group projects, and rewards for students who are quickest to speak. Cain instead favors recognition of deep focus and talent for listening with empathy and patience, noting that in the business world people don't read books together or write memos together. The Quiet Revolution (company) created a Quiet Schools Network to partner with educators to design techniques to develop the talents of introverted students, such as by beginning public speaking programs with lower-anxiety assignments and incrementally increasing challenges as the student progresses.

Cain encourages parents, first, to understand that introverts' nerve biologies react more strongly to stimulation, and that the reactions can be draining through no preference of their own. Also, Cain urges parents to help their children be "intelligent consumers" of social media with its constant personal evaluation, despite its enabling introverts to communicate "without being at the party."

== Reception ==
Quiet Power started at #4 on The New York Times bestseller list (children's middle grade hardcover category).

== See also ==
- Extraversion and introversion, complementary personality traits
- Quiet Revolution, a company co-founded by Cain
