= Temperament Isolation Theory =

Temperament Isolation Theory, also known as personality bias or personality discrimination, is a recent social science theory that attempts to explain how cultures favor a specific temperament and how they view and interact with those of other or opposite temperaments. The first concepts of the theory were explored by Susan Cain in her book Quiet where she looked at how western cultures, particularly the United States, value extroversion over introversion and how that could possibly make it difficult for introverts to thrive in society. Northern Arizona University professor Jorge Rodriguez III took the idea a step further and viewed how the opposite could be viewed in eastern cultures where introversion is valued over extroversion. These observations and further research led to the concept of "personality bias" which suggests certain personalities are favored over others and that these opposing personalities are "intentionally or unintentionally oppressed or muted." The concept of personality bias was later formally formulated into Temperament Isolation Theory. The theory is currently not widely accepted among social scientists, but it is gaining ground thanks to the research of Rodriguez and others.

== History/Origins ==
The concept of personality bias was explored by Susan Cain in her book Quiet: The Power of Introverts in a World that Can't Stop Talking, released in January, 2012. Cain explored how western cultures, particularly that of the United States, place much value on extroversion. The social structures of the U.S. including the workforce and public education encourage and teach people to be outspoken, engaging and group-minded. Cain refers to this bias as the "extrovert ideal" where people are valued for what they say and how they present themselves rather than their character, talents and skills. She also discusses the rise of collaboration and groupthink in the United States and how group work is seen as superior or more effective than individual contribution. Cain argues that the extrovert ideal has made it difficult for introverts to thrive and succeed in the United States.

Cain also introduced definitions and parameters for temperament. According to the Cain, temperament (extroversion and introversion) is a person's core personality and influences many of the traits the person develops over his or her lifetime. Temperament is not defined on how social a person is or on whether they are shy or not. Rather, temperament is influenced by sensory sensitivity. Introverts are highly sensitive to outside stimulus and can often be overwhelmed by it. Extroverts are much less sensitive to stimulus and often need more exposure to it in order to feel a response. For example, an introvert may feel overwhelmed at a rock concert because she is sensitive to all the stimuli (music, lights, voices, touch etc.) and she is taking all of it in at once, whereas an extrovert is not sensitive and wants to experience these stimuli even more. Cain also notes that temperament is a spectrum rather a definitive extreme. Some introverts are less sensitive than others and feel more comfortable in social situations and vice versa. People lean more towards introversion or extroversion and, in some cases, fall in the middle (ambivert). Temperament can also be situational in which a single individual may exhibit more extroverted or introverted traits in specific situations.

Temperament as it pertains to eastern cultures is also briefly touched on by Cain. She notes that eastern cultures are the opposite of western cultures in that they tend to value introversion over extroversion. She specifically examined the experiences of Asian-American families. Asian-Americans struggle a lot in American society because their culture and home life encourage introversion, but their social lives outside the home put pressure on them to be extroverted.

Susan Cain and her book Quiet are credited with starting what is called the "Quiet Revolution" which calls for introverts to learn to value and appreciate themselves and use their strengths to find their place in society. The movement is rather small but is nonetheless designed to help introverts cope with inequalities and difficulties they face in an extroverted-dominated society.

== Expansion and Social Scientific Research ==
Social Scientist and Associate Professor at Northern Arizona University Jorge Rodriguez III was intrigued by the ideas presented by Cain and began to research them scientifically in 2012. Rodriguez's research found that extroversion is indeed highly valued in the United States and that this value of extroversion often does come at the expense of marginalizing introverts. However, Rodriguez believed this was mostly unintentional and some introverts have been successfully able to bypass the "personality bias" with strong, creative ideas and hard work ethic. Regardless, a personality does exist which can lead to the oppression of introverts.

Rodriguez took his research a step further and looked how personality bias differs among cultures. While Cain briefly touched on the subject in Quiet, Rodriguez felt further research and observation was needed. Rodriguez found that eastern cultures, particularly that of Hong Kong, China, had a personality bias for introversion. Unlike the U.S., China places more value on character and individual leadership. The good of organization or group, including the family, is much more important than individual desire and need. Being quiet is seen as a symbol of wisdom, humility and selflessness. By contrast, extroversion can be viewed as a symbol arrogance and self-interest. Much like how the climate in the U.S. has marginalized introverts, the value of introversion in China has made difficult for extroverts to find respect and success. However, unlike the U.S. where this oppression is mostly unintentional, Rodriguez believes it is more deliberate in China as the culture has a spoken affliction towards extroverts.

Rodriguez based much of his research in the concepts and ideas of other social scientific research and theory. In particular, Rodriguez used Muted Group Theory to see if temperaments can be muted/silenced much like other minority groups. While much less common and less extreme than with other minority groups based on sex and race, people of certain temperaments can indeed be muted by the dominant group, intentionally or unintentionally.

== Formulation of a Formal Theory ==
Not long after his research into personality bias, Rodriguez began work on the formulation of a formal theory. Using Muted Group Theory as the basis and incorporating the findings and observations of his research, Rodriguez formally introduced Temperament Isolation Theory in his book Temperament Isolation: The Study of Personality Bias in Culture. Rodriguez used the term temperament in his theory to emphasize that it covers "overall personality" and not "individual traits and idiosyncrasies." He also wanted to use temperament to emphasize that extroversion and introversion are not a measure of sociability but "other factors that have the potential to affect how one socializes." The term isolation is also used to show that oppression is not always intentional. The theory suggests that certain temperaments, relative to culture, are inherently favored over others and this favoritism can often lead to the muting or oppression of opposite temperaments which can then make living in this culture challenging, impeding their success and acceptance of their beliefs, behaviors and values.

Assumption of Temperament Isolation Theory:

- Cultures are naturally inclined to favor certain temperaments.
- Favoritism towards a temperament almost always results in the isolation of other temperaments, intentional or not.
- Temperament refers to overall personality.
- Temperaments are not a measure of sociability.
- Temperaments are biologic and fixed from birth like race and sex.

While personality bias is not viewed to be on the same scale as racial discrimination or sexism, Rodriguez argues that it is still a concern because temperament is biologically fixed like race and sex. While people may be able to adjust their behaviors and "mask" their true personalities but they cannot change their core temperament. If a person is introverted, they will always be introverted and vice versa. Rodriguez did not formulate Temperament Isolation to be a critical theory, but he acknowledges that it might address social inequality issues.

== Expansion, Criticism and Future ==
Rodriguez plans to expand on the ideas of Temperament Isolation, particularly as it relates to other cultures. While most cultures can be divided into western and eastern, Rodriguez believes it may be more diverse than that. Rodriguez in particular wants to study Middle Eastern and South American cultures as he feels they don't quite align with the standard western and eastern distinctions. Rodriguez is also interested in researching the possibility of temperaments beyond introversion and extroversion. The idea of ambiversion is of particular interest as ambiverts are supposed to be sensory balanced.

Temperament Isolation Theory is not currently accepted as formal social science theory. Many sociologists feel the theory needs more concrete concepts and empirical data. Rodriguez's research and observations are considered preliminary and many feel there needs to be more measurable results (qualitative and quantitative) to support the theory. In addition to preliminary nature of the theory, some sociologists suggest the idea of personality bias in itself is illogical. Critics feel Cain and Rodriguez are "over extending" by trying to suggest that discrimination or oppression of personality is similar to racial discrimination or sexism.

In addition to Rodriguez's future research plans, other social scientists are exploring the idea of personality bias. Researchers like Janise Hoalburrough and Sean Greeson applied concepts of personality bias to workforce performance and success. Personality bias has also reinvigorated the study of personality and temperament by psychologists. Michelle Chavira recently published an article that explores new research in temperament and included some of Rodriguez's findings. Susan Cain is also continuing her "Quiet Revolution" where she attempts to empower introverts and help them find success.
