= Voice of Tibet =

Voice of Tibet may refer to:

- Voice of Tibet (Norway)
- Voice of Tibet (China)
