= Toxic positivity =

Construct in psychology

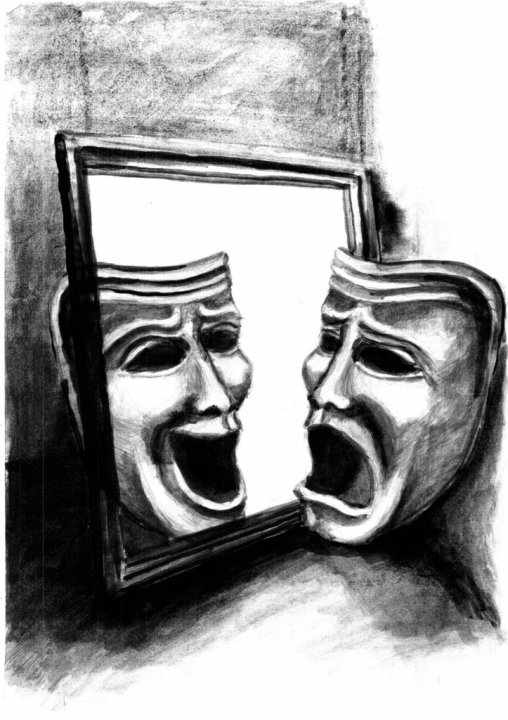
Toxic positivity involves a limited ability to acknowledge one's own anger or sadness.

Toxic positivity (excessive positivity or positive toxicity) is dysfunctional emotional management without the full acknowledgment of negative emotions, particularly anger and sadness. Socially, it is the act of dismissing another person's negative emotions by suggesting a positive emotion instead.

Enforcement of positive thinking is beneficial only in restricted situations, and in many others may worsen a person's ability to deal effectively with negative outcomes. The toxicity may cause physical illness such as cardiovascular disease.

== Definition ==
Toxic positivity is a "pressure to stay upbeat no matter how dire one's circumstance is", which may prevent emotional coping by feeling otherwise natural emotions. Toxic positivity happens when people believe that negative thoughts about anything should be avoided. Even in response to events which normally would evoke sadness, such as loss or hardships, positivity is encouraged as a means to cope, but tends to overlook and dismiss true expression.

The concept of unrealistic optimism has been explored by psychologists at least since 1980, and the term toxic positivity first appeared in J. Halberstam's 2011 The Queer Art of Failure with "[...] to poke holes in the toxic positivity of contemporary life".

Toxic positivity is distinguished from toxic flattery, which is excessive or sycophantic praise or flattery directed to another person.

== Psychology ==
In one sense, toxic positivity is a construct in psychology about how to handle emotions that is built upon the assumption that positive and negative emotions should match the appropriate situation. This is viewed as healthy psychologically. However, toxic positivity is criticized for its requirement to feel positive all the time, even when reality is negative. According to Dr. Jamie Zuckerman, “The inherent problem with this concept is that we assume that if a person is not in a positive mood (or whatever we think a positive person should look or act like), then they are somehow wrong, bad, or inadequate. The problem is that, when we invalidate someone else’s emotional state – or in this case, when we tell someone that feeling sad, angry, or any emotion that we consider ‘negative’ is bad - we end up eliciting secondary emotions inside of them like shame, guilt, and embarrassment.”

In her 2022 book, Bittersweet: How Sorrow and Longing Make Us Whole, author Susan Cain describes the "tyranny of positivity" or "toxic positivity" as a cultural directive that says, "Whatever you do, don't tell the truth of what it's like to be alive".

Cain said that, historically and especially in the nineteenth century, boom-and-bust cycles led not only to reverence for successful businessmen, but also to attributing lack of success not to external circumstance but to a failure of character, a form of victim blaming. Cain documents this perceived failure of character as being reflected in the evolving definition of the term "loser". The result is a culture with a "positivity mandate"—an imperative to act "unfailingly cheerful and positive, ... like a winner".

Beginning in about 2019, the Internet search term toxic positivity became more popular.

Positivity is generally seen as a good and helpful attitude for most situations, because it reflects optimism and gratitude and it can help lighten moods. Healthy positivity differs from toxic positivity, in that it acknowledges negative emotions of sadness, anger and jealousy, and pushes for growth and learning through setbacks and conflicts. On the other hand, toxic positivity arises from an unrealistic expectation of having perfectly happy lives all the time. When this does not happen, people "can feel shame or guilt" by being unable to attain the perfection desired. Accordingly, positivity becomes toxic when a person rejects negative feelings even when they are appropriate. It is believed that one must be happy in all types of situations, ignoring other emotions. As a result of denying these feelings, it can often lead to further unhappiness in the long run.

People with a constant requirement for positive experiences may be inadvertently stigmatizing their own negative emotions, such as depression, or suppressing natural emotional responses, such as sadness, regret, or stress. Accepting negative emotions can make a person happier and healthier overall. Some authors, such as Kimberley Harrington, see toxic positivity as a form of personal emotional gaslighting. Harrington believes that it is fine to be "sad when you're sad and angry when you're angry" and to fully feel one's "rainbow of feelings".

Uncontrollable and controllable situations are important determinants of positivity. If the situation is controllable, artificially positive thinking can thwart a person's ability to fix the negative situation. Another determinant is the person's attitude toward happiness which may prevent an optimal response to the inevitable negative experiences that life brings. Positivity becomes toxic with the inability to examine and fix past mistakes. To gloss over inevitable mistakes with exaggerated confidence is unhelpful because it prevents learning from mistakes.

Toxic positivity can sustain an unhappy marriage, but research shows that unhappily married couples are 3–25 times more at risk for developing clinical depression.

Critics of positive psychology have suggested that too much importance is placed on "upbeat thinking, while shunting challenging and difficult experiences to the side". Finally, by not allowing negative emotions, toxic positivity may result in physical consequences, such as cardiovascular and respiratory disease.

The concept of "tragic optimism"—a phrase coined by the existential-humanistic psychologist and Holocaust survivor Viktor Frankl—has been suggested as an antidote to toxic positivity. Tragic optimism involves the way tragedies are processed, searching for meaning during and after those tragedies.

== Social media ==
Social media such as LinkedIn, Instagram, or Facebook may exacerbate the problem as it often emphasizes positive experiences and discourages coping with the inevitable downsides. A study on "Toxic positivity on social media: The drawbacks and benefits of sharing positive (but potentially platitudinous) messages online" found that the display of positivity online can be "beneficial to message senders only if message senders have higher (versus lower) self-esteem or if they experience less (vs. more) toxicity". The effect of the display of positivity on the message sender can be deemed as negative if the messages suppress the negative aspects of the perceived reality. Social media is a platform for individuals to post whatever content or media they desire. In some cases, one may project a positive outlook on social media to avoid reality. Such excessive signs of toxic positivity can eventually lead to an identity shift toward the "process of self-transformation that is the result of intentional self-presentation in a mediated context". Social media platforms are an easy way to compare one another, putting additional pressure on individuals to be or stay positive. This can create divergent viewpoints and conflicting perceptions of reality.

== Gender ==
A study on "Gender differences in levels of toxic positivity in adolescents: a quantitative study" showed a significant difference between male and female adolescents. Surveys and interviews indicated that adolescent girls typically showed lower levels of toxic positivity in comparison to adolescent boys. These results indicate that adolescent females are likely to be better at acknowledging and expressing their negative emotions than adolescent males.

This claim is further backed by another study, "Acceptability and Suppression of Negative Emotion in Anxiety and Mood Disorders", where 60 participants with anxiety and mood disorders and 30 control participants watched an emotion-provoking film. They self-reported their measures, and the clinical participants deemed their emotions as "less acceptable" and therefore suppressed their emotions. The study showed that there was a notable difference between female and male participants. Males in the control group reported more suppression than females in the same group, although both males and females in the clinical group reported suppression to the same degree.

== See also ==
- Cognitive dissonance
- Cycle of abuse
- Emotional exhaustion
- Emotional labor
- Emotion work
- Doublethink
- Hedonic treadmill
- Illusion of control
- List of cognitive biases
- Magical thinking
- Optimism and optimism bias
- Rational expectations
- Rat race
- Self-deception
- Smiley
