= Øystein Alme =

Norwegian author

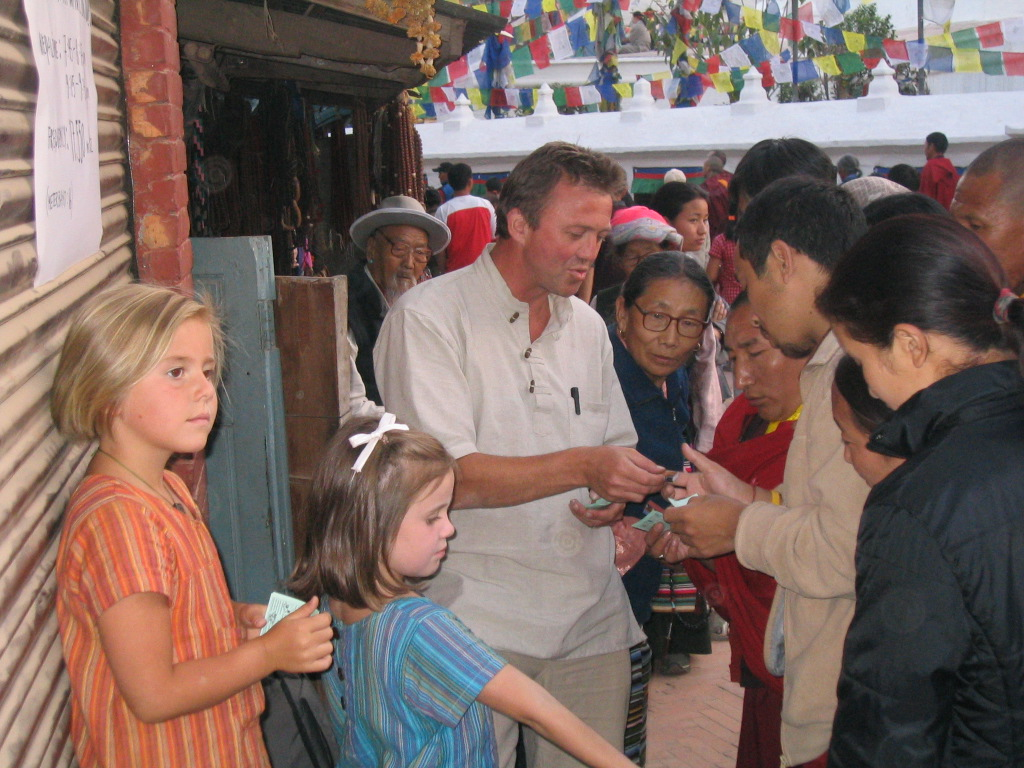
Øystein Alme in Kathmandu

Øystein Alme (born 10 August 1960) is a Norwegian author. He wrote, with Morten Vågen, the book Silenced: China's Great Wall of Censorship, published by Amaryllis Media in late May, 2006.

The book, according to Reporters Without Borders, "takes the reader on a fascinating and disturbing trip behind China’s Great Wall of Censorship. It also tells the story of Voice of Tibet, the radio station China couldn't silence."

The book has been released in several countries, most notably in China and in Poland (expanded version).

Øystein Alme is also the administrative director of Voice of Tibet.
