= Silencio =

Silencio (Portuguese or Spanish for "silence") may refer to:

== Music ==
- "Silencio" (David Bisbal song), 2006
- "Silencio" (Rafael Hernández song), 1932
- "Silencio" (U2 song), 2026
- "*~Silencio...Shh", a 2023 song by Marf Yau
- "Silencio", a 2004 song by Cristian Castro from Hoy Quiero Soñar
- "Silencio", a 2009 song by Nelly Furtado from Mi Plan

== Film and television ==
- Club Silencio, a fictional club in the 2001 film Mulholland Drive
- Lake Silencio, a fictional lake in the Doctor Who episodes "The Impossible Astronaut" and "The Wedding of River Song"
- Silencio, working title of Pedro Almodóvar's 2016 film Julieta
- Silencio, a luchador character of Kenny Hotz

== See also ==
- Silence, the relative or total lack of audible sound
- Silence (disambiguation)
- El Silencio (disambiguation)
