= Morten Vågen =

Norwegian writer

Morten Vågen (born 13 November 1975) is a Norwegian author. He wrote, together with Oystein Alme, the book Silenced - China’s Great Wall of Censorship, published by Amaryllis Media in late May 2006. The book, according to Reporters Without Borders, "takes the reader on a fascinating and disturbing trip behind China’s Great Wall of Censorship. It also tells the story of Voice of Tibet, the radio station China couldn’t silence."

The book has been released in several countries, most notably in China and in Poland.

Morten Vågen is also the author of several articles and the experimental "Anecdotes about Karkov", a short prose work published in publishing house Gyldendal Norsk Forlag`s Vinduet in 2003.

In the spring of 2012 the Norwegian publisher Kolon published the book Group 12, where two of Morten Vågens prose works is included: "Preface" and "The Red Chapter". According to Kolon: "Group 12" collects "texts in progress" from the writers that will shape the future of Norwegian fiction."
