= 98.2 FM =

FM radio frequency

The following radio stations broadcast on FM frequency 98.2 MHz:

- CNR The Voice of China in Meizhou
- BBC Radio 1 in Borders, Bridgend, Great Glen, Hereford, Central Southern England, Lancs, Milton Keynes, Penicuik
