= 945 AM =

AM radio frequency

The following radio stations broadcast on AM frequency 945 kHz:

== China ==
- CNR The Voice of China, mainly in Jilin City

== Defunct ==
=== United Kingdom ===
- Gold in Derby, England
