= Bittersweet: How Sorrow and Longing Make Us Whole =

Book by Susan Cain

- Author: Susan Cain
- Language: English
- Subject: Personality psychology; intrapersonal; interpersonal; self-help; success; management
- Genre: Non-fiction
- Publisher: Crown Publishing Group
- Publication date: April 5, 2022 (hardcover)
- Publication place: United States
- Media type: Hardcover; paperback; Kindle edition; Audible audio
- Pages: 352
- ISBN: 978-0-451-49978-3
- Preceded by: Quiet Power

Bittersweet: How Sorrow and Longing Make Us Whole is a 2022 nonfiction book written by American author Susan Cain.

Bittersweet is based on the premise that "light and dark, birth and death—bitter and sweet—are forever paired". Cain encourages the reader to accept feelings of sorrow and longing as inspiration to experience sublime emotions—such as beauty and wonder and transcendence—to counterbalance the "normative sunshine" of society's pressure to constantly be positive. The book advises that sensitivity to the bittersweet—both the bitter and the sweet in life—elevates our way of creating, leading, raising children, loving, and achieving a deeper and more enriching life.

== Background ==
Cain describes her first moment of clarity with the concept of longing, which occurred during a time of transition after leaving a New York law firm, ending one long-term relationship, and becoming consumed in an obsessive relationship with a lyricist/musician. A friend offered that what Cain was actually longing for was what the lyricist/musician represented, and Cain knew instantly that what she was longing for was the writer's life.

Years earlier, a law school classmate's humorous question of why Cain listened to "funeral music" started her thinking for 25 years, pondering why she found sad music uplifting, or even something closer to joy. Calling herself "melancholic by nature", she said that minor-key music eventually became an impetus to start writing Bittersweet. Release of Cain's third TED talk (July 2019), "The hidden power of sad songs and rainy days", was timed to closely precede the April 2022 publication of Bittersweet. A Washington Post review described how, "drawing on the music of Leonard Cohen, psychological research and her own inheritance as a descendant of Holocaust victims, Cain delivers a book-length treatise on how to live alongside pain. ... (T)he art of suffering becomes the book's central example to show how pain opens a path to beauty."

== Content and concepts ==
(Cain) pivots away from the Quiet franchise and championing the overlooked introvert in favor of championing overlooked feelings.

— Delia Cai, Vanity Fair

As Bittersweet was published ten years after Cain's first book, Quiet: The Power of Introverts..., a Vanity Fair commentator wrote that Bittersweet "pivots away from the Quiet franchise championing the overlooked introvert in favor of championing... overlooked feelings". Cain remarked that, a short time after starting to write Bittersweet, she "realized that as in Quiet, Bittersweet is also about a way of being in the world, which properly understood is like a superpower, but that normal culture does not recognize as such."

The book has been described as "part memoir and partly a look at neuroscience, psychology, spirituality, religion, epigenetics, music, poetry and art". It has also been described as "a mix of psychology, historic references, and interviews deployed to consider how a healthy dose of melancholy...can inform our experiences of connection, grief, and mortality". The book includes examples of beauty flowing from embracing the melancholy, and offers advice for moving through loss, allowing pain to inform leadership, and reckoning with the inevitability of death.

Bittersweet is based on the premise that "light and dark, birth and death—bitter and sweet—are forever paired". Cain defines bittersweetness as "a tendency to states of longing, poignancy, and sorrow; an acute awareness of passing time; and a curiously piercing joy at the beauty of the world." Bittersweet asserts that the power of bittersweetness to encourage creativity and fulfillment is dramatically overlooked in modern society, stymying people and companies from reaching their goals. A Toronto Star reviewer described the book as positioning dark-side feelings as guiding lights, "letting pain become your superpower", an "appeal against America's monocracy of the can-do", and providing respite from the "tyranny of positivity".

=== Benefits ===
To transform pain into beauty

This book was basically a five-year quest to grasp the power of a bittersweet and even melancholic way of being. And what I learned is that the bittersweet tradition spans centuries—it spans continents. And it teaches us that we are creatures who are born to transform pain into beauty. It also teaches us that our feelings of bittersweetness are some of the greatest gateways that we have to states of creativity and connection and love.

— Susan Cain, April 7, 2022

Cain lists three main benefits of embracing the bittersweet: creativity, connection, and transcendence. She cites research indicating that people attuned to life's fragility, and people who are in transitional states of life (divorce, approaching death), tend to find a sense of meaning in their lives, have a greater sense of gratitude, are more focused on deeper relationships, and are less likely to feel angry and irritable.

==== Creativity ====
Cain cites studies variously indicating a large percentage of highly creative people were orphaned in childhood, but also that creative people whose parents live to old age are disproportionately prone to sorrow; that people who work in the arts are much more likely than others to suffer mood disorders; that artists' negative emotions were predictive of their creative output; and that sadness is the main negative feeling that drives creativity. She also cites research indicating that sad moods tend to sharpen our attention, make us more focused and detail oriented, improve our memories, and correct our cognitive biases.

Recognizing that many creative people are sanguine (happy) in nature, Cain suggests that "it's not that pain equals art. It's that creativity has the power to look pain in the eye, and to decide to turn it into something better." Referring to Leonard Cohen's life story, Cain wrote that "the quest to transform pain into beauty is one of the great catalysts of artistic expression."

==== Connection ====
Cain writes that "the sadness from which compassion springs is a pro-social emotion", and that our instinct to feel bad when we see somebody else feeling bad–and to want to do something about it–"is as much a part of humanity as our need to breathe". The sharing of our individual longing is one of our "deepest sources of communion" with others, and if we don't acknowledge our own pain, we may end up inflicting it on others through abuse, domination or neglect. Describing Maya Angelou, Cain describes "wounded healers" as "people whose capacity for joy and connection is strengthened by their ability to experience melancholy or sorrow".

==== Transcendence ====
"There's a crack in everything—
that's how the light gets in."

I selected that quote from (Leonard Cohen's) song "Anthem" as the epigraph to the book because I think it says, in one sentence, everything I'm trying to work through in this book.

— Susan Cain, August 2022

Calling herself "deeply agnostic", Cain says that there have been both religious and secular expressions of transcendence flowing from a longing for a more perfect and beautiful world. Positing a definition of transcendence as "a moment in which your self fades away and you feel connected to the all", Bittersweet relates that Cain experiences something close to this state when listening to melancholy music. She advises that our own longings reveal to us the path that we should be following, "pointing you in the direction of the sacred (and) wondrous".

=== Physiological and epigenetic basis ===
Cain's research indicates that the vagus nerve—responsible for digestion, breathing and heart rate—is also associated with compassion, our instinct to protect our young, and desire to experience pleasure. Cain says this nerve is also the site of the very "sadness-joy-survival continuum" that makes us human, and that we are "deeply evolutionarily primed" to respond to each other's sadness.

Bittersweet also discusses transgenerational trauma, which Cain refers to as "inherited grief". Cain describes this new area of scientific research into biomarkers—for example, possessed by descendants of Holocaust survivors—that allow them to feel empathy and love for ancestors they have never met, or more generally for people who have intense reactions to losses they did not themselves experience.

=== Pressure from culture ===
Cain said that, historically and especially in the nineteenth century, boom-and-bust cycles led not only to reverence for successful businessmen, but also to attributing lack of success not to external circumstance but to a failure of character. Cain documents this perceived failure of character as being reflected in the evolving definition of the term, loser. The result is a culture with a "positivity mandate"—an imperative to act "unfailingly cheerful and positive, ... like a winner".

Modern culture condemns painful emotions as useless and shameful and to be suppressed rather than, as Cain posits, as an inspiration to creativity and transformative potential. Young people, especially, are pressured by the idea of "effortless perfection" to conceal and feel ashamed of feelings of sadness or imperfection that are normal parts of human experience—rather than using painful experiences as an opportunity to learn. Cain argues against society's unrelenting obsession with "normative sunshine", saying we have a culture that is "afraid of sorrow and longing, and therefore unable to draw on its powers".

In the workplace, Cain perceives some progress in the recognition of the value of compassionate management, and allowing employees to share their troubles and voice concerns rather than repress them. She cites research indicating that bosses exhibiting anger are perceived as having "position power" that projects status and influence, whereas melancholic bosses were perceived as having "personal power" that inspires loyalty and can enhance productivity. Cain cites instances indicating in which sharing troubles with co-workers creates a supportive environment, increase productivity, reduce turnover, and increase workplace safety.

=== Historical antecedents and recent misinterpretation ===
Two thousand years ago, Aristotle wondered why the great poets, philosophers, artists, and politicians often have melancholic personalities. ... Aristotle's question never went away; it can't. There's some mysterious property in melancholy, something essential. ... I've concluded that bittersweetness is not, as we tend to think, just a momentary feeling or event. It's also a quiet force, a way of being, a storied tradition—as dramatically overlooked as it is brimming with human potential. It's an authentic and elevating response to the problem of being alive in a deeply flawed yet stubbornly beautiful world.

— Bittersweet at pp. xxii-xxiv

An ancient belief held the human body contains four "humors" corresponding to respective temperaments, namely, melancholic (sad), sanguine (happy), choleric (aggressive), and phlegmatic (calm). Cain says that Aristotle wondered why great poets, philosophers, artists, and politicians often had melancholic personalities—personalities corresponding to Cain's concept of bittersweetness. Cain also related that philosopher Marsilio Ficino proposed that Roman god Saturn, associated with melancholy, "claims for himself a life sequestered and divine"; artist Albrecht Dürer famously depicted melancholy as a downcast angel surrounded by symbols of creativity, knowledge, and yearning; and poet Charles Baudelaire could "scarcely conceive of a type of beauty" in which there is no melancholy.

More recently, however, melancholy was dismissed by Sigmund Freud as narcissism and subsequently became viewed as pathological, with mainstream psychology viewing it as synonymous with clinical depression. Similarly, Cain said that Abraham Maslow disproportionately emphasized being upbeat and happy as the norm, and saw human sorrow and yearning for something more as primarily pathological—contributing to "toxic positivity" in our culture. Cain thus considers bittersweetness to be "dramatically overlooked" as it is "brimming with human potential".

=== Distinguished from depression ===
Cain says her work is "a clear-eyed view of what life is"—necessarily both bitter and sweet—and that we experience our deepest states of love, happiness, awe and creativity precisely because life is imperfect, not in spite of that fact. She emphatically distinguishes depression—"extremely painful... kind of an emotional black hole"—from bittersweetness, which is "a normal part of human experience and one of (its) most generative parts". Melancholy is said to allow one to "feel connected to the ecstasies of the universe", but depression is a source of despair. Though the two states "take you to completely different destinations", Cain posits that melancholy and depression themselves probably differ as a matter of degree rather than as a matter of kind. Cain's research for Bittersweet found that this distinction was present in the history of psychology for thousands of years but has been lost in modern times.

=== Bittersweet outlook ===
Cain has said that the most fundamental aspect of being human is the longing to live in a more perfect and beautiful world, and that sorrow, longing, and grief allow for joy, love, compassion, and spiritual connection to be all the more meaningful. Cain explains that bittersweetness is not a momentary feeling, but rather "a quiet force, a way of being, a complex tradition" that is "brimming with human potential". She advises that the bittersweet state of mind can be cultivated by regularly performing small acts of beauty, and by briefly performing "expressive writing" about one's troubles.

== Reception ==
A Washington Post review remarked that the book contains "seeds of several potentially beautiful books in various chapters", but in its "blend of memoir, pop psychology, music criticism and self-help, there is an undisciplined interdisciplinarity". Along similar lines, a Harvard Crimson review faulted the book for having so many "analytical paths" that it is not "especially focused". However, the Crimson review said that those analytical paths are "worth discussing", and a Sydney Morning Herald review said that "Cain is an expert at connecting disparate ideas in a readable and satisfying style". The Crimson reviewer also wrote that Cain's presentation was "commendable", doing "a fabulous job of helping even the most unemotional reader connect the ideas of melancholy to the context of their own life". A Canberra Times review said the book included "beautifully crafted—and well-researched—passages on creativity, sorrow and longing, mortality and grief, and personal redemption", calling it "an intriguing book that takes a profoundly compassionate tilt at connections within the human condition".

A New York Times critic noted that, since Cain wrote she "didn't fact-check the stories people told me about themselves, but included only those I believed to be true", it was difficult to know how seriously to take this book as a document of scholarship or reportage. Though finding the book's premise and most of its anecdotes and evidence "obvious", and criticizing Cain's over-reliance on anecdotes from people of privilege, the critic wrote that the book's best parts lay out the "tyranny of positivity—that particular American obsession with highlighting happiness over sadness".

A Toronto Star reviewer wrote that "Cain has written a gorgeous, compassionate, companionate book. It's a weird book. But still gorgeous". The reviewer perceived an "internal illogic"—to "opt out of everything's OK in order to be more OK.

A review in The Guardian called the book a "mawkish manifesto", and "a kind, optimistic and unflaggingly earnest book, not a fleck of humour on the horizon". Saying Bittersweet is an "easy-on-the-ego hybrid of genres" that is "really... a motivational book" born of Cain's desire for "a kinder, deeper, more connected and creative world", the review criticized it for not dealing with differences among political groups, cultures, classes and religions, and for mixing the profound with the mawkish.

Cain herself said that, though Quiet and Bittersweet are "very different" books, readers of each book reported feeling understood and validated.

=== Distinctions and recognition ===
- Business Insider listed Bittersweet among the 20 most anticipated non-fiction books of 2022.
- The New York Times listed Bittersweet as #1 bestseller in both "Hardcover Nonfiction" and "Combined Print & E-Book Nonfiction" categories (as listed April 14, 2022).
- The Calgary Herald, crediting The Vancouver Sun, listed Bittersweet as the #8 best selling New Release internationally for the week of April 9, 2022.
- Bittersweet was the #8 best selling audiobook on Audible.com for week ending April 8, 2022.
- Included in "The Best of the Year (So Far) 2022" list at Audible.com, June, 2022.
- Included in "Best science books of 2022 — so far" list at Amazon.com, June, 2022.
- Included in "The 12 Best Self-Help Books on Topics That Matter Most" in The Wall Street Journal, November, 2022.
- Included in Audible's "13 Best Well-Being Listens of 2022", November, 2022.
- Included in the Greater Good Science Center's "Favorite Books of 2022", December, 2022.
- Included in KCRW (NPR station) "Life Examined's best reads of 2022", December, 2022.
- Included in Amazon's "Best nonfiction of 2022", late December, 2022.
- Included in Money Control (India) "Yearender 2022 — 5 must-read health and wellness books", December 31, 2022.
- Selected for Oprah's Book Club, February 2023.
- Included in IndieBound Trade Paperback Nonfiction Bestsellers, July 2023.
- The New York Times listed Bittersweet as #10 bestseller in "Paperback Nonfiction" (listing date August 6, 2023)

== Bittersweet: The Play ==
In Bittersweet: The Play, a mother experiences the tragic loss of her child, and the Buddha says that he can resurrect her daughter if she can procure a mustard seed from a house not touched by grief. On her journey, she encounters historical characters—who were discussed in the book—who transformed their grief into history-changing offerings.

== Lucky & Norman ==
Collaborating with five family members, Cain co-authored an animated children's book Lucky & Norman: Saying Goodbye Is Bittersweet. The book recounts how two young brothers form a friendship with two donkeys during a farm vacation. Published on June 2, 2026, the book is inspired by the theme of Bittersweet.

== See also ==
- Personality psychology
- Toxic positivity
- Sensory processing sensitivity
- Cultural neuroscience
- Neurodiversity
- Epigenetics

== Further reading and media ==
- Cain, Susan (speaker); Kym, Min (musician) (July 2019). "The hidden power of sad songs and rainy days". TED.com. (Video on YouTube)
- Cain, Susan; Rodgers, Whitney Pennington (March 2022). "Why bittersweet emotions underscore life's beauty". TED.com. (TED interview with Ms. Rodgers)
- Cain, Susan (April 2022). "Bittersweet Teachings" (PDF). SusanCain.net. Archived (PDF) from the original on April 1, 2022.
- Cain, Susan (April 2022). "How bittersweet are you, at this moment in time? (quiz)". SusanCain.net. Archived from the original on April 14, 2022.
- "toxic positivity". Dictionary.com. Dictionary.com Tech and Science Dictionary. June 3, 2022. Archived from the original on June 6, 2022.
