= Television in Tibet =

Television was introduced late into the Tibet Autonomous Region compared to the rest of China, with the first test transmissions conducted on 1 May 1978.

The province owns China Tibet Broadcasting, while there are also city-level television stations such as Lhasa Television in Lhasa, the regional capital. As of early 2026, there were 620,000 satellite television users.

== History ==
Television arrived late to Tibet, compared to the rest of the People's Republic. By 1973, Tibet was the last region in China without television, as all other provinces and autonomous territories have already introduced such a service. Television was introduced in nearby Qinghai in 1971, but, although it had a sizable Tibetan population, broadcasts were conducted entirely in Chinese until 1984, broadcasting fifteen minutes a day in the language, three times a week.

On 1 May 1978, Tibet Television started test transmissions in black and white, before upgrading to color on 1 October 1979 (the thirtieth anniversary of the proclamation of the People's Republic). The station started full transmissions under Voice of Tibet (China Tibet Broadcasting) on 20 August 1985, with the name of the station being signed by Deng Xiaoping in Mandarin and Ngapoi Ngawang Jigme in Tibetan. At the time, it broadcast a one-channel general service in both languages.

Just before the autonomous region's television station made its first full broadcast, Lhasa Television opened on 25 December 1984. In Lhasa, Tibet Television broadcast on VHF channel 8 and Lhasa Television on VHF channel 10. Television grew in urban areas, where most people could afford a color set, but not in rural areas. By the late 1990s, Tibet Television got a second frequency on channel 12. In 1999, VOT started broadcasting a third channel entirely in Tibetan, but it was mostly underfunded: its news bulletin was essentially a translation of the existing Chinese service.

Television infrastructure developed in the 2000s and, by 2007, half of the rural population had access to some sort of television signal. In the decade alone, local coverage increased, such as coverage of local meetings, openings of new malls, luxury items and criticism of the Dalai Lama. There was also analog cable television, where subscribers could access at least fifty channels.

During the 2000s, most dramas watched by Tibetans were made by Chinese from eastern provinces, or were Korean and Western imports dubbed into Chinese. Few Western world productions as of 2000-2001 were dubbed into Tibetan, such as The Avengers and Wiseguy, as well as movies such as The Rock, The Mask and Crocodile Dundee. There were however moves to make fully-Tibetan dramas within Tibet since 1987, however, early productions were rudimentary. In 2008, the first purely Tibetan sitcom, Happy Life aired.

At the end of 2025, the Chinese government reported that 99,77% of the TAR had access to radio and television, and massively installed high definition terminals in the region. The International Campaign for Tibet condemned the decision as it accused the CCP of blocking access to independent satellite channels. Between 2023 and 2025, local television stations made the conversion: Chamdo's television station became the first prefectural-level channel in China to broadcast in HD in December 2024 and was uplinked via satellite; the conversion in Shigatse was done aiming at farmers; Lhoka installed equipment to receive the FTA Huhutong satellite platform in late 2025; citizens of Nagchu got access to CCTV-3, CCTV-5, CCTV-6 and CCTV-8 and Nyingtri launched its HD channel in November 2023.
