= Firedrake =

Firedrake may refer to:

- Firedrake (folklore), a fiery flying serpent or dragon in European folklore
- Shooting star, a fiery streak flying across the night sky

== Arts and entertainment ==
- Firedrakes, the species of mythological creatures the character Fenella belongs to in Gerald Durrells 1974 fantasy children's book "The Talking Parcel"
- Firedrake, a character in the comic book series Miracleman
- Firedrake, a character in the 1997 children's novel Dragon Rider
- Firedrake (Dungeons & Dragons), a role playing game monster
- The Firedrake, a 1965 historical novel by Cecelia Holland

== Ships ==
- HMS Firedrake (1912), an Acheron-class destroyer launched in 1912 and sold in 1921
- HMS Firedrake (H79), an F-class destroyer launched in 1934 and sunk in 1942
- USS Firedrake, a Mount Hood-class ammunition ship launched in 1944 and decommissioned in 1971

== Other users ==
- Firedrake Lake, a lake in the Northwest Territories, Canada
- The Firedrake, a shortwave radio jammer in China
