= Silenzi =

Silenzi is an Italian surname. Notable people with the surname include:

- Andrea Silenzi (born 1966), Italian retired footballer
- Christian Silenzi (born 1997), Italian footballer

== See also ==
- Silence (disambiguation)
