= Camera shyness =

Desire to avoid being photographed or filmed

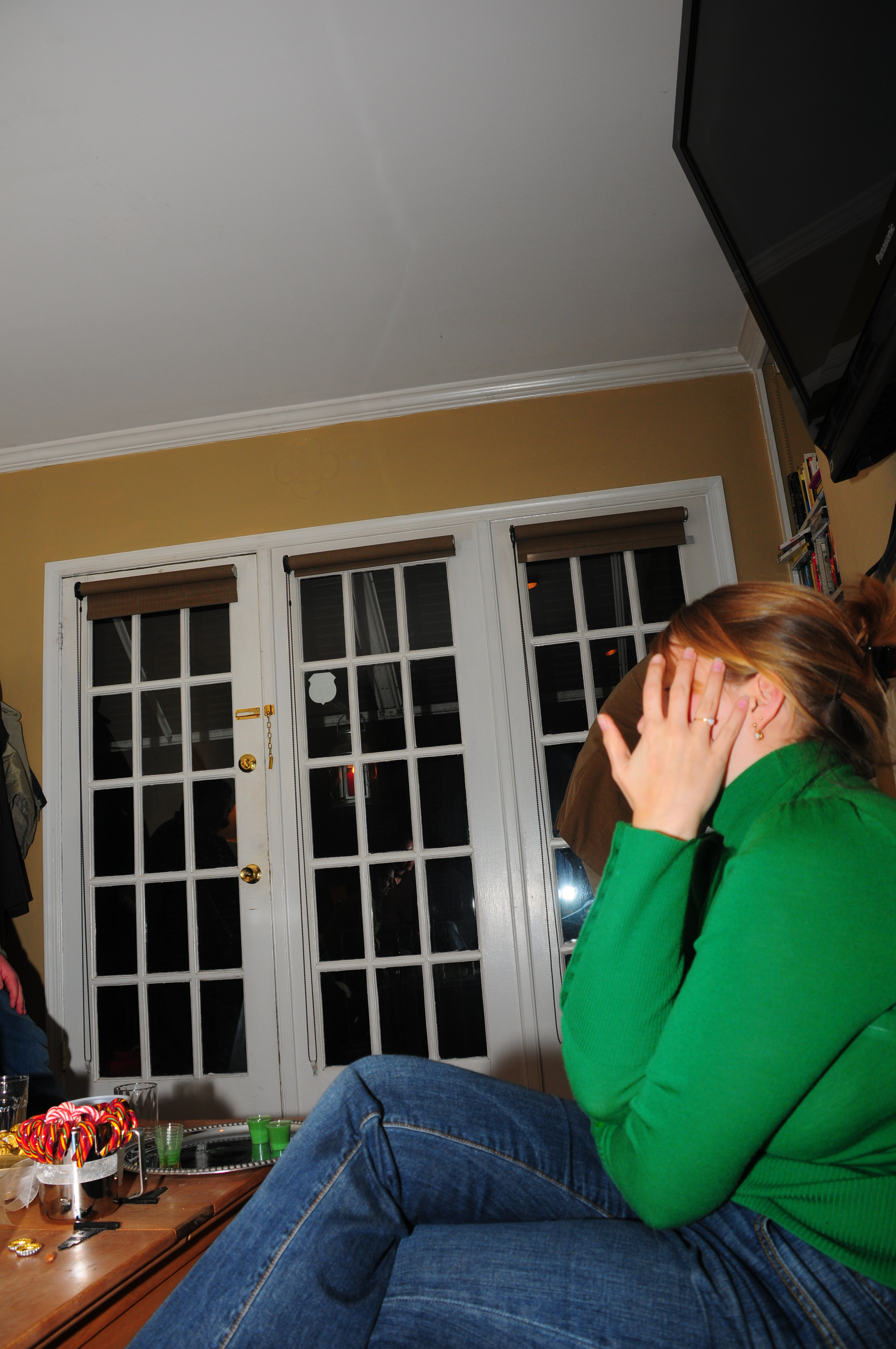
A camera-shy person hides her face

Camera shyness is the desire to avoid being photographed or filmed. It is common for individuals who are camera-shy to fear public speaking, performing in front of an audience, and having one's picture taken by any type of camera or by video camera. It can be a consequence of shyness itself, which can be related to low self-esteem, anxiety and fear. Shyness can be a result of social anxiety, public self-consciousness, low assertiveness, and introversion. An individual who experiences camera shyness is often in fear of the unexpected or the unknown in social situations, causing them to avoid the camera. In a social situation that is anxiety-inducing, people tend to have behavioral responses that prevent the situation from getting worse. According to Crozier, anxiety can be separated into three elements: cognitions, physiological responses and behavior. An individual walking away or hiding their face is a behavioral response from camera shyness. A physiological response to camera shyness can be shaking or an increase in heart rate. A cognitive response can be how a person remembers a terrible experience with cameras, which results in fear of being photographed or filmed.

== See also ==
- Scopophobia, fear of being looked at
- Shyness
- Social anxiety
