= El Silencio =

El Silencio may refer to:

- El Silencio (es), district in Caracas, Venezuela
  - El Silencio, station of Caracas metro
- El Silencio, Panama, small town in Bocas del Toro
- El Silencio, Costa Rica, village and nature park in the Guanacaste Province, Costa Rica.
- El Silencio (album), 1992 album by Caifanes
- El Silencio, 1938 novel by Juan Felipe Toruño
