= Shyness =

Feeling of apprehension, discomfort or awkwardness in the presence of other people

Shyness is a personality trait distinct from introversion and social anxiety disorder.

Shyness (also called diffidence) is a psychological trait characterized by social inhibition and apprehension in response to new social environments or perceived social judgement. It is frequently associated with social avoidance. Although shyness can be an attribute of people who have low self-esteem, the trait is often defined by a concern regarding the negative evaluation of others, such as mocking or rejection. While shyness is considered a normal personality variant, it is distinct from clinical conditions such as social anxiety disorder, which involves impairment in daily functioning.

== Origins ==
Genetic data suggests that shyness is heritable, though environmental factors, such as child abuse or ridicule contribute to its development. Shyness may precede or result from physical anxiety symptoms, and is distinct from both social anxiety and social anxiety disorder. Shyness may be a personality trait or can occur at certain stages of development in children.

=== Genetics and heredity ===
Research indicates a positive correlation between childhood fearfulness and the development of shyness. Some studies suggest that higher levels of cortisol in shy children are associated with increased susceptibility to illness.

Several genetic links to shyness are current areas of research. Mouse models have also been used, to derive genes suitable for further study in humans. One such gene, the GAD gene, which is involved in producing GABA (a chemical that helps regulate brain activity and anxiety), has so far been shown to have some association with behavioral inhibition (a tendency to experience distress in new situations).

The genetics of shyness involves the study of candidate genes related to dopamine and serotonin regulation. Studies have identified modest correlations between shyness and specific variations of the DRD4 gene and the 5-HTTLPR (a region of the serotonin transporter gene). However, the influence of these individual genetic markers is considered small, and research into their connection with related conditions, such as social anxiety or obsessive-compulsive disorder, is ongoing. The long form of the 5-HTTLPR polymorphism (a common genetic variation) has been shown to be modestly correlated with shyness in grade school children. Previous studies had shown a connection between this form of the gene and both obsessive-compulsive disorder and autism.

Thalia Eley argues that only about 30% of shyness as a trait is genetically inherited, while the rest emerges as a response to the environment.

=== Mercury poisoning ===
Characteristics such as excessive shyness, embarrassment, and social phobia are associated with erethism (a neuropsychiatric syndrome resulting from chronic mercury poisoning).

=== Prenatal development ===
Evidence suggests an association between day length during pregnancy and the prevalence of shyness. A longitudinal study indicated that shorter day length during the midpoint of gestation may be associated with an increased probability of shyness in childhood.

=== Low birth weights ===
There is an observed correlation between birth weight and shyness or cautiousness in children. Findings suggest that those born at low birth weights are more likely to be shy, risk-averse and cautious compared to those born at normal birth weights. However, this association does not establish a causal relationship.

== Personality trait ==
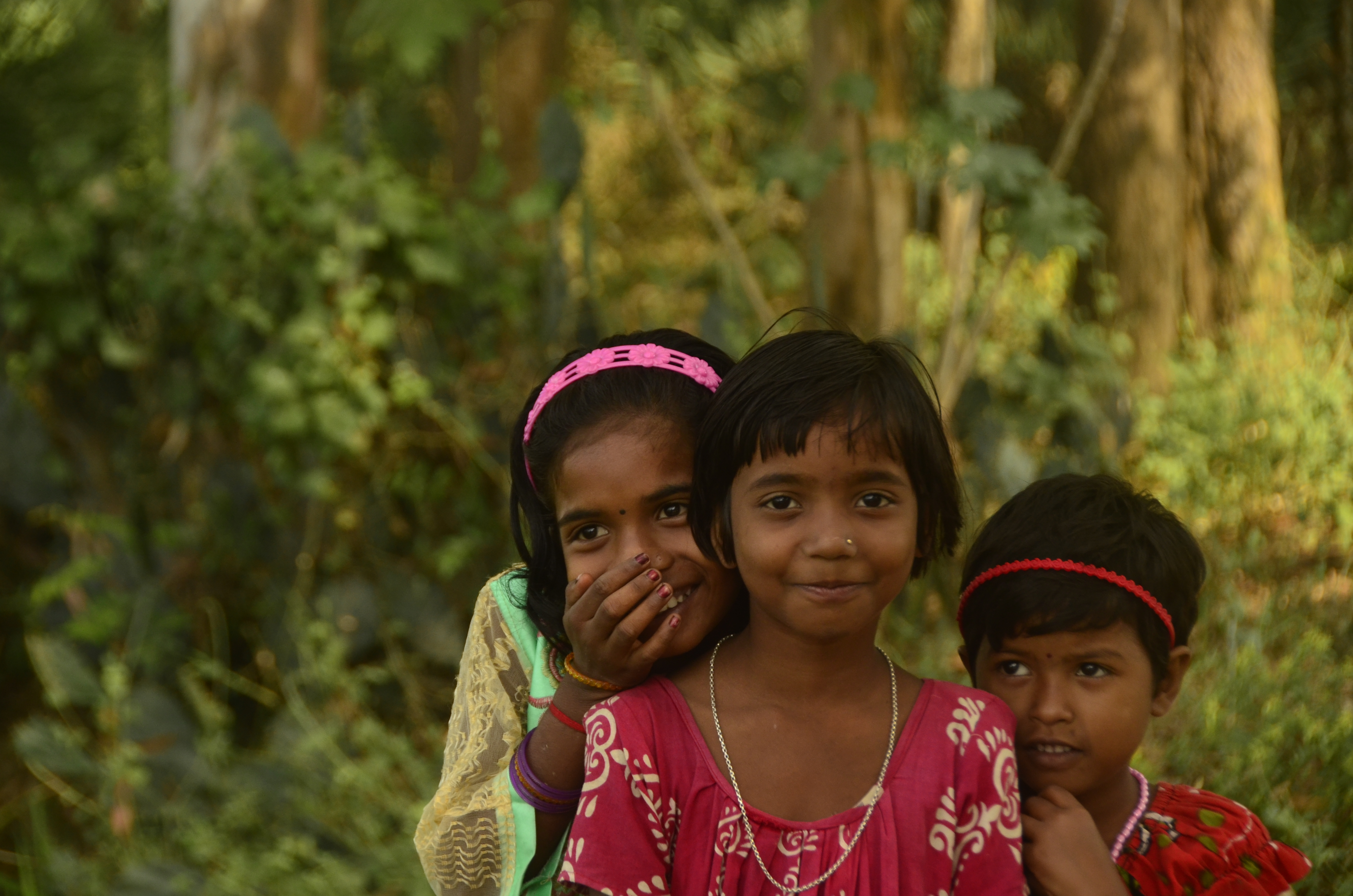
Putting one's hand over their mouth while laughing is often seen as an example of shyness in certain cultures (first child), as is hiding behind somebody else's back (third child)

In psychology, shyness is categorized as a stable personality trait characterized by consistent patterns of behavior, thought, and emotion across various social contexts. Psychological research distinguishes between state shyness, a temporary response to a situation, and trait shyness, a long-term personality characteristic. Trait shyness is associated with behavioral inhibition and a tendency to avoid unfamiliar social environments. It is distinct from introversion, which involves a preference for low-stimulation environments rather than a fear of social judgment. Longitudinal studies suggest that while the intensity of shyness can fluctuate throughout the lifespan, the underlying trait remains relatively stable for many individuals. Shy individuals often internalize problems rather than expressing concerns, which can be associated with increased risks of depression and anxiety.

Manifestations of shyness include social discomfort, difficulty with verbal expression, and physical signs of uneasiness. In some instances, individuals perceive themselves as uninteresting or engage in atypical behaviors to generate social interest, which can result in further social alienation. In cultures that prioritize sociability, these reserved behaviors tend to be misinterpreted by peers as being distant or egotistical. Social interactions for shy individuals are typically characterized by decreased eye contact and inhibited posture.

=== Educational Impact ===
Shyness can also be seen as an academic determinant. Research shows a negative relationship between shyness and classroom performance. As an individual's shyness increased, classroom performance decreased.

== Related traits and conditions ==
=== Introversion ===
While often colloquially equated with shyness, introversion is a distinct trait characterized by a preference for low-stimulation environments rather than social distress. Research by Bernardo J. Carducci states introversion is a preference for low-stimulation environments, whereas shyness involves a desire for social contact hindered by anxiety. Research using the statistical techniques of factor analysis and correlation has found shyness overlaps mildly with both introversion and neuroticism (i.e., negative emotionality). Low societal acceptance of shyness or introversion may reinforce a shy or introverted individual's low self-confidence.

Both shyness and introversion can outwardly manifest as socially withdrawn behaviors, such as tendencies to avoid social situations, especially when they are unfamiliar. Research indicates that shyness and introversion possess clearly distinct motivational forces and lead to different personal and peer reactions, and therefore cannot be described as theoretically the same, with Susan Cain's Quiet (2012) further discerning introversion as involving being differently social (preferring one-on-one or small group interactions) rather than being antisocial altogether.

Research suggests that no unique physiological response, such as an increased heart rate, accompanies socially withdrawn behavior in familiar compared with unfamiliar social situations. However, unsociability leads to decreased exposure to unfamiliar social situations and shyness causes a lack of response in such situations, suggesting that shyness and unsociability affect two different aspects of sociability and are distinct personality traits. In addition, different cultures perceive unsociability and shyness in different ways, which affects self-esteem. Collectivist cultures view shyness as a more positive trait related to compliance with group ideals and self-control, while perceiving chosen isolation (introverted behavior) negatively as a threat to group harmony; and because collectivist society accepts shyness and rejects unsociability, shy individuals develop higher self-esteem than introverted individuals. On the other hand, individualistic cultures perceive shyness as a weakness and a character flaw, while unsociable personality traits (preference to spend time alone) are accepted because they uphold the value of autonomy; accordingly, shy individuals tend to develop low self-esteem in Western cultures while unsociable individuals develop high self-esteem.

=== Social anxiety disorder ===
Clinical assessments distinguish shyness from social anxiety disorder (SAD) by the severity of anxiety and the resulting degree of functional impairment. While they share features like embarrassment and social avoidance, SAD involves a fear of negative evaluation that interferes with occupational or social roles. In contrast to social anxiety disorder, normative shyness typically does not result in functional impairment or the pervasive avoidance of social obligations. By 1994, however, when DSM-IV was published, it was given a second, alternative name in parentheses (social anxiety disorder) and was now said to be relatively common. According to the National Institute of Mental Health, the lifetime prevalence of social anxiety disorder among U.S. adults is approximately 12.1%, with an estimated 7.1% having experienced the disorder in the past year. Studies examining shy adolescents and university students found that between 12 and 18% of shy individuals meet criteria for social anxiety disorder.

Physical symptoms of social anxiety disorder can include blushing, shortness of breath, trembling, increased heart rate, and sweating. In some cases, these symptoms are intense enough to cause a panic attack.

=== Behavioral inhibition ===
Social inhibition is the conscious or unconscious constraint of behavior for social reasons, often manifesting as shyness. There are different levels of social inhibition, from mild to severe. Social inhibition can be adaptive when it prevents harmful behavior, but may be maladaptive when it hinders constructive social participation, such as classroom discussion.

Behavioral inhibition is a temperament or personality style that predisposes a person to become fearful, distressed and withdrawn in novel situations. This personality style is associated with the development of anxiety disorders in adulthood, particularly social anxiety disorder.

== Misconceptions and negative aspects ==
Cultural values influence the perception of shyness. In individualistic cultures, social assertiveness is often highly valued by rewarding outgoing behaviors. Reserved behavior may be misinterpreted as a lack of confidence or competence. Common misconceptions include equating shyness with lower intelligence or viewing it as synonymous with introversion and social anxiety disorder.

=== Intelligence ===
Research consistently indicates no correlation between intelligence and shyness. While shyness may limit classroom engagement, longitudinal data suggests it is unrelated to actual academic knowledge or test performance. Social manifestations of shyness can affect how an individual's intelligence is perceived by others. In educational settings, shy children may find it difficult to demonstrate knowledge during verbal discussions, which may result in some educators underestimating their academic abilities.

== Benefits ==
Thomas Benton suggested that the drive for independent achievement in shy individuals may be accompanied by a desire for social connection, often manifested through altruistic behavior. Susan Cain argues that U.S. cultural norms frequently prioritize extroverted traits, which may lead to an underappreciation of characteristics associated with shyness, such as listening skills and contemplative thinking. In earlier generations, such as the 1950s, society perceived shyness as a more socially attractive trait, especially in women, indicating that views on shyness vary by culture.

Susie Scott argued that treating shyness as an individual pathology overlooks its role as a socially produced state of mind. Scott said that social competence often involves a level of performance, suggesting that most individuals use social masks to navigate interactions. Some individuals identify with shyness as a core part of their identity, suggesting that social structures should adapt to accommodate diverse social temperaments rather than requiring shy individuals to change.

== Different cultural views ==
In cultures that value outspokenness and overt confidence, shyness can be perceived as weakness and may be mistaken as cold, distant, arrogant or aloof, which can be frustrating for the shy individual. However, in other cultures, shy people may be perceived as being thoughtful, intelligent, good listeners and as being more likely to think before they speak.

In cultures that value autonomy, shyness is often analyzed in the context of being a social dysfunction, and is frequently contemplated as a personality disorder or mental health issue. Some researchers are beginning to study comparisons between individualistic and collectivistic cultures, to examine the role that shyness might play in matters of social etiquette and achieving group-oriented goals. "Shyness is one of the emotions that may serve as behavioral regulators of social relationships in collectivistic cultures. For example, social shyness is evaluated more positively in a collectivistic society, but negatively evaluated in an individualistic society."

In a foundational 1992 study of Chinese and Canadian school children, researchers sought to measure several variables related to social reputation and peer relationships, including "shyness-sensitivity." Using peer nomination questionnaire, students evaluated their fellow students using positive and negative playmate nominations. "Shyness-sensitivity was significantly and negatively correlated with measures of peer acceptance in the Canadian sample. Inconsistent with Western results, it was found that items describing shyness-sensitivity were separated from items assessing isolation in the factor structure for the Chinese sample. Shyness-sensitivity was positively associated with sociability-leadership and with peer acceptance in the Chinese sample."

=== Western perceptions ===
In some Western cultures shyness-inhibition plays an important role in psychological and social adjustment. It has been found that shyness-inhibition is associated with a variety of maladaptive behaviors. Being shy or inhibited in Western cultures can result in rejection by peers, isolation and being viewed as socially incompetent by adults. However, research suggests that if social withdrawal is seen as a personal choice rather than the result of shyness, there are fewer negative connotations.

For Charles Darwin, shyness was an "odd state of mind", appearing to offer no benefit. Writer Joe Moran notes that since the 1970s, some psychological perspectives have increasingly viewed shyness through a pathological lens, though evolutionary perspectives also recognize the survival advantages of cautious temperaments. However, evolutionary survival advantages of careful temperaments over adventurous temperaments in dangerous environments have also been recognized.

=== East Asian perceptions ===
In East Asian cultures shyness-inhibition in school-aged children is seen as positive. Those who exhibit these traits are generally accepted by peers and perceived as competent by educators, performing well in school and to showing well-being. Research in Chinese schools has suggested that shy-inhibited children are more likely to be nominated for leadership roles by their peers compared to Western cohorts. Being shy or inhibited does not correlate with loneliness or depression as in the West.

=== Examples of shyness and inhibition ===
Cultural norms in some Hispanic contexts, such as rewarding students privately rather than publicly, may be misinterpreted as shyness by educators unfamiliar with these customs.

Socially close cultures based on agriculture (Kenya, India, etc.) experience lower social engagement than those in more open communities (US, Okinawa, etc.) where interactions with peers are encouraged. Children in Mayan, Indian, Mexican and Kenyan cultures are less expressive in social styles during interactions and they spend little time engaged in socio-dramatic activities.

In Italian culture emotional expressiveness during interpersonal interaction is encouraged. From a young age children engage in debates or discussions that encourage and strengthen social assertiveness. Independence and social competence during childhood is also promoted. In Italian contexts, social inhibition is often negatively appraised by parents and peers, as cultural norms tend to prioritize social assertiveness. Similar trends observed in both North American and Italian samples show that peers of shy and inhibited Italian children reject those who are socially fearful, cautious, and withdrawn. These withdrawn and socially fearful children express loneliness and believe themselves to be lacking the social skills needed in social interactions.

== Intervention and treatment ==
Psychological methods and pharmaceutical drugs are commonly used to treat shyness in individuals who feel affected because of low self-esteem and psychological symptoms, such as depression or loneliness. According to research, early intervention methods that expose shy children to social interactions involving teamwork, especially team sports, decrease their anxiety in social interactions and increase their overall self-confidence later.

One important aspect of shyness is social skills development. If schools and parents implicitly assume children are fully capable of effective social interaction, social skills training is not given any priority (unlike reading and writing). As a result, shy students are not given an opportunity to develop their ability to participate in class and interact with peers.

== See also ==
- Boldness
- Camera shyness
- Haya (Islam)
- People skills
- Selective mutism
- Avoidant personality disorder
- Highly sensitive person
- Medicalization of behaviors as illness
