= Silence (disambiguation) =

Silence is the lack of audible sound.

Silence or The Silence may also refer to:

== Places ==
- Silence, a district of southern Brussels, Belgium

== People with the name ==
- Silence Dogood, a pen name of Benjamin Franklin
- Silence Mabuza (born 1977), South African boxer
- Silence Wang (born 1989), Chinese pop singer
- The Silence (producer) (Mark Maclaine), a British educator, director, and music producer

== Arts, entertainment, and media ==
=== Fictional characters ===
- Silence (Doctor Who), fictional aliens in Doctor Who
- Lady Silence, an Inuk character in Dan Simmons' 2007 novel The Terror

=== Films and television series ===
- Silence (1926 film), a silent film by Rupert Julian
- Silence (1931 film), a film by Louis J. Gasnier and Max Marcin
- Silence (1963 film), a Soviet two-part feature by Vladimir Basov
- The Silence (1963 film), a film by Ingmar Bergman
- Silence (1971 film), a film by Masahiro Shinoda based on the 1966 novel by Shūsaku Endō
- The Silence (1975 film), a made-for-TV film about James Pelosi
- The Silence (1998 film), a film by Mohsen Makhmalbaf
- Cisza (film) or Silence, a 2001 Polish film by Michal Rosa
- Dead Silence or Silence, a 2006 horror film
- The Silence (2006 film), an Australian television film
- Silence (2010 film), a 2010 Indian Kannada-language film
- The Silence (2010 film) or Das letzte Schweigen, a German film
- The Silence (TV series), a 2010 BBC TV series
- Hiljaisuus or Silence, a 2011 Finnish film by Sakari Kirjavainen
- Barfi! or Silence, a 2012 Indian Hindi-language film
- Silence (2013 film), an Indian Malayalam-language film
- The Silence (2015 film), an Indian Marathi-language film by Gajendra Ahirey
- Silence (2016 film), a film by Martin Scorsese, also based on the Endō novel
- The Silence (2019 film), a horror film by John R. Leonetti, based on the novel by Tim Lebbon
- Silence (2020 film), an Indian Tamil-language thriller film
- A Silence, a 2023 drama film
- Silence, an Indian film series, including:
  - Silence... Can You Hear It? (2021)
  - Silence 2: The Night Owl Bar Shootout (2024)

=== Literature ===
- Silence (1969 play), a short play by Harold Pinter, first performed in 1969
- The Silence, a 1969 novel by Jens Bjørneboe, the third and final part in his History of Bestiality-trilogy
- Silence (1999 play), a play by Moira Buffini
- Silence (Balmont), an 1898 poetry collection
- Silence (Kennaway novel), 1972, by James Kennaway
- Silence (Fitzpatrick novel), 2011, by Becca Fitzpatrick
- Silence (Endō novel), 1966, by Shūsaku Endō
- "Silence", an 1839 poem by Edgar Allan Poe
- Le Roman de Silence, a thirteenth-century Old French novel by Heldris of Cornwall
- Silence: A Christian History, a 2013 book by Diarmaid MacCulloch
- "Silence: A Fable", a short story by Edgar Allan Poe
- Silence: Lectures and Writings, a 1961 collection of writings by John Cage
- The Silence, a 2015 horror novel for Tim Lebbon
- The Silence (novel), a 2020 novel by Don DeLillo

=== Music ===
==== Compositions ====
- 4′33″ or Silence, a composition by John Cage
- Silence, a composition by Charlie Haden
- Silence, a composition by Halvor Haug
- Silence, a composition by Michael Isaacson

==== Groups and labels ====
- Silence (band), a Slovene electronic music duo
- Mott the Hoople, a British rock band formerly known as Silence
- Silence 4, a Portuguese band
- Silence Records, a Swedish record label
- The Silence, an Australian band of the 1960s that featured Graham Goble, later of Little River Band
- The Silence, a 1960s band from Leatherhead that evolved into John's Children

==== Albums ====
- Silence (Blindside album) (2002)
- Silence (Anthony Braxton album) (1969)
- Silence (Facemob album) (2002)
- Silence (Charlie Haden album) (1989)
- Silence (Tara MacLean album) (1996)
- Silence (David Murray album)
- Silence (Slapshock album) (2006)
- Silence (Sonata Arctica album) (2001)
- Silence (Unashamed album) (1994)
- Underconstruction 1: Silence, a 2003 extended play album by Gigi D'Agostino
- Silence, a 2014 album by Cadaveria
- Silence, a 1987 album by Stephan Eicher

==== Songs ====
- "Silence" (Delerium song), 1999
- "Silence" (Marshmello song), 2017
- "Silence" (Stromae song), 2010
- "Silence", by Aly & AJ from Insomniatic, 2007
- "Silence", by Before the Dawn from Soundscape of Silence, 2008
- "Silence", by Caligula's Horse from Moments from Ephemeral City, 2011
- "Silence", by Chaos Divine from The Human Connection, 2011
- "Silence", by Chimaira from This Present Darkness, 2011
- "Silence", by A Day to Remember from Big Ole Album Vol. 1, 2025
- "Silence", by Dawn of Solace from Waves, 2020
- "Silence", by DragonForce from Reaching into Infinity, 2017
- "Silence", by Gomez from Split the Difference, 2004
- "Silence", by Jars of Clay from The Eleventh Hour, 2002
- "Silence", by Jay Chou from Fantasy, 2001
- "Silence", by Level 42 from Staring at the Sun, 1988
- "Silence", by Mike Posner from At Night, Alone, 2016
- "Silence", by The Parlotones from Radiocontrolledrobot, 2005
- "Silence", by Primal Fear from Black Sun, 2002
- "Silence", by Rainbow from Stranger in Us All, 1995
- "Silence", by Seal from Seal 6: Commitment, 2010
- "Silence", by Sevendust from Next, 2005
- "Silence", by The Ting Tings from Sounds from Nowheresville, 2012
- "Silence", by Vanilla Ninja from Love Is War, 2006
- "Silence", by Visions of Atlantis from Eternal Endless Infinity, 2002
- "Silence (Pretending's So Comfortable)", by As It Is from Never Happy, Ever After, 2015
- "The Silence" (song), by Alexandra Burke, 2009
- "The Silence", by Bastille from All This Bad Blood, 2013
- "The Silence", by The Devil Wears Prada from Flowers, 2025
- "The Silence", by Gamma Ray from Heading For Tomorrow, 1990
- "The Silence", by Mayday Parade from Anywhere But Here, 2009

=== Television ===
==== Programs ====
- Silence (TV series), a 2006 Taiwanese television series starring Vic Zhou
- The Silence (TV series), a BBC One series about a deaf girl who witnesses a murder

==== Episodes ====
- "Silence" (Death Note episode) (2007)
- "Silence" (The Following), a 2015 episode of The Following
- "The Silence" (The Amazing World of Gumball), a 2019 episode of The Amazing World of Gumball
- "The Silence" (Six Feet Under episode) (2005)
- "The Silence" (The Twilight Zone), an episode of The Twilight Zone

=== Other uses in arts, entertainment, and media ===
- Silence (video game), a 2016 point-and-click adventure game
- Silence! The Musical, a 2003 off-Broadway musical parody of the film Silence of the Lambs

== Other uses ==
- Silence (charity), a Hong Kong charity for the deaf
- Silence (climb), a difficult climbing route in Flatanger, Norway
- Silence, a brand name for lorazepam
- Silence S04, a brand of electric motorcycles and microcars

== See also ==
- List of silent musical compositions
- Quiet (disambiguation)
- Silenced (disambiguation)
- Silencing (disambiguation)
- Silencio (disambiguation)
- Silent (disambiguation)
- Cylance
