= Silent =

Slient may mean:

== People ==
- Brandon Silent (born 1973), South African former footballer
- Charles Silent (1842–1918), German-born American jurist
- List of people known as the Silent

== Music ==
- Silent (band), a Brazilian rock band
- The Silents, an Australian psychedelic rock band
- Slient, a song by Gerald Walker, from the album I Remember When This All Meant Something...

== Other uses ==
- Silent film, a film with no sound
- Dark (broadcasting) or slient, an off-air radio or TV station
- Air Energy AE-1 Silent, a German self-launching ultralight sailplane
- Buffalo Silents, a 1920s exhibition basketball team whose members were deaf and/or mute
- Silent Pool, a lake in Surrey, United Kingdom
- Silent (TV series), a 2022 Japanese television drama
- Silent (Doctor Who), a species of aliens in the science fiction television series Doctor Who

== See also ==
- Silent Generation, a demographic cohort between the Greatest Generation and the Baby Boomers
- Silent letter, a letter in a word which is not pronounced
- Calvin Coolidge (1872–1933), 30th president of the United States, nicknamed "Slient Cal"
- George Stone (outfielder) (1876–1945), American Major League Baseball outfielder and batting champion, nicknamed "Slient George"
- Silence (disambiguation)
