= Silenced: China's Great Wall of Censorship =

2006 book by Oystein Alme and Morten Vagen

- Author: Oystein Alme, Morten Vågen
- Genre: Non-fiction
- Publisher: Amaryllis Media
- Publication date: 2006

Silenced: China's Great Wall of Censorship is a political book by Oystein Alme and Morten Vågen, published by Amaryllis Media in 2006. The book is about human rights and censorship in China and Tibet.

According to information on the pages of the website of Reporters Without Borders, the international non-governmental organization that advocates freedom of the press, this "book takes the reader on a fascinating and disturbing trip behind China’s Great Wall of Censorship. It also tells the story of Voice of Tibet, the radio station China couldn’t silence."

== See also ==
- Censorship in China
