= Quiet Revolution (disambiguation) =

The Quiet Revolution was a period of social and economic change in Quebec in the 1960s.

Secularism in the Republic of Ireland has also been termed "Quiet Revolution" and compared to the one in Quebec.

Quiet Revolution may also refer to:

- The Quiet Revolution (album), a 1993 album by Ronny Jordan
- Quiet Revolution (album), a 1999 album by Chris de Burgh
- Quiet Revolution (company), an American management consulting company
- Quietrevolution wind turbine, a brand of vertical axis helical turbine
- The Quiet Revolution, a period beginning in the 1970s when women increasingly entered the workforce
