= The Voice of China (radio channel) =

Chinese Radio station

The Voice of China 中央人民广播电台中国之声
- China

Programming
- Language: Mandarin Chinese
- Format: News and talk

Ownership
- Owner: China National Radio

History
- First air date: 30 December 1940; 85 years ago

Links
- Webcast: Listen Live
- Website: china.cnr.cn

The Voice of China (Chinese: 中央人民广播电台中国之声 or 中国之声), a.k.a. CNR-1, is the flagship radio channel of China National Radio (CNR). It provides news and commentaries and broadcast 24 hours a day (exc. BJT 2:05-4:25 on Tuesday) via AM, FM, SW and Internet.

== History ==
The infrastructure began with a transmitter from Moscow to set up its first station in Yan'an (延安). It used the call sign XNCR ("New China Radio") for broadcasts, and is the first radio station established by the Chinese Communist Party in 1940 during the Chinese Civil War. In the west, it was known as the Yan'an New China Radio Station (延安新华广播电台) broadcasting two hours daily. In China, it was called the Yan'an Xinhua Broadcasting Station, which was established on December 30, 1940.

On March 11, 1947, it was renamed Shanbei Xinhua Broadcasting Station (陕北新华广播电台) after it departed from Yan'an. It began to broadcast in Beiping under the name of Peiping Xinhua Broadcasting Station (北平新华广播电台) on March 25, 1949. On December 5, 1949, it was officially renamed Central People's Broadcasting Station 1st Program (中央人民广播电台第一套节目), two months after the proclamation of the People's Republic of China.

On January 1, 2004, CNR-1 was rebranded as The Voice of China.

== Frequency ==
All units of below numbers are Kilohertz (kHz), except FM radios which are Megahertz (mHz). Many of these shortware or medium wave frequencies may also be used as jamming frequency to hold up remote devices from receiving signals of the Voice of America, Radio Free Asia, Radio Taiwan International, etc.

=== Shortwave ===
(DRM radio frequencies are marked bold) 6030, 6075, 6105, 6145, 6180, 7300, 9455, 9470, 9540, 9570, 9655, 9660, 9680, 9735, 9870, 9900, 11605, 11640, 11695, 13825, 15370, 15320, 15465, 15735, 17770, 17790, 17800, 17830, 21555

Part of these SW frequencies may temporary shut down during PM 14:00-17:00 on every Tuesday

=== Medium wave ===
- 540 (nationwide, mainly in Changsha, Dandong, Fuzhou, Guiyang, Liaoyang, Shanghai, Shenyang, Xi'an, Yingkou, and Zhuzhou, also available in Lianjiang County of Taiwan)
- 603 (in Chenzhou, Hengyang, Yongzhou, and Huaihua)
- 612 (in Chaozhou, signal launches by Shanmen Village of Raoping County with 3 kW launching power)
- 639 (nationwide, mainly in Beijing, Chengdu, Nanning, and Panjin, signal launches by 542 launch pad of NRTA with 200 kW launching power, may cover most of Japan, Korean Peninsula, Mongolia and Russian Far East in the night)
- 648 (in Jinan, signal launches by Qianfoshan MW station)
- 756 (nationwide, mainly in Guangzhou, Haikou, Harbin, Qingdao, and Shaoyang)
- 900 (in Benxi (urban area), Jiangmen)
- 927 (in Yiyang, Yueyang, and Zhuzhou)
- 945 (nationwide)
- 981 (nationwide, mainly in Changchun, Chongqing, Maoming, Nanchang, and Yingkou, signal launches by 561 launch pad of NRTA with 200 kW launching power, may cover Taiwan and Okinawa Prefecture of Japan in the night)
- 1008 (nationwide, mainly in Kunming)
- 1035 (nationwide, mainly in Dalian, Datong, Fuxin, Ganzhou, Huanren (Benxi), Jinzhou Liaoyang, Mudanjiang, Qiqihar, Tieling, Wuhan, Yingkou, and Zhangjiajie, signal launches by 707 launch pad of Jiangxi Radio & TV station with 10 kW launching power)
- 1134 (nationwide)
- 1143 (in Chaoyang, Nanning, and Xiangxi)
- 1170 (nationwide, mainly in Huizhou)
- 1359 (nationwide, mainly in Chengde, Nanjing, Sanming, Xiamen, and Zhangzhou, also available in Kinmen of Taiwan)
- 1377 (nationwide, mainly in Zhengzhou, signal launches by 554 launch pad of NRTA with 600 kW launching power, may cover part of Japan, South Korea and Taiwan in the night)
- 1422 (nationwide)
- 1440 (in Putian and Kinmen of Taiwan)
- 1503 (in Nanning)
- 1539 (nationwide)
- 1593 (nationwide, mainly in Changzhou, signal launches by 623 launch pad of NRTA with 400 kW launching power, may cover most of Japan, Korean Peninsula, and west of Taiwan in the night)

=== FM radio ===
- 87.2 (in Benxi (urban area))
- 87.6 (in Nantong)
- 88.1 (in Nanning)
- 88.2 (in Panjin)
- 88.4 (in Deyang, Xuzhou, and Zhuzhou)
- 88.5 (in Zhangjiajie)
- 88.6 (in Shigatse and Weinan)
- 88.7 (in Ürümqi)
- 88.8 (in Meizhou)
- 89.0 (in Tongchuan)
- 89.1 (in Dalian, Nanchang)
- 89.2 (in Lhasa)
- 89.3 (in Guangzhou, Loudi (05:00-01:00 next day))
- 89.4 (in Rizhao, Wuxi)
- 89.5 (in Putian and Kinmen of Taiwan)
- 89.8 (in Guilin, Jinan)
- 89.9 (in Harbin, Meizhou)
- 90.0 (in Maoming)
- 90.2 (in Chaozhou, Hangzhou, and Pingdingshan)
- 90.5 (in Yuxi)
- 90.9 (in Xiangxi)
- 91.0 (in Zengcheng (Guangzhou))
- 91.4 (in Yongxing Island (Sansha))
- 91.5 (in Benxi County)
- 91.6 (in Xining)
- 92.0 (in Chongqing, Yiyang, and Lianjiang County of Taiwan)
- 92.3 (in Chaozhou)
- 92.4 (in Nanchong)
- 92.9 (in Liaoyang)
- 93.0 (in Huizhou)
- 93.1 (in Qingdao)
- 93.2 (in Tangshan)
- 93.5 (in Chenzhou, Fuzhou, Hefei, and Lianjiang County of Taiwan)
- 93.6 (in Guiyang)
- 94.1 (in Shanwei)
- 94.3 (in Tieling)
- 94.4 (in Jiamusi)
- 94.6 (in Luoyang)
- 94.7 (in Changde)
- 94.8 (in Lanzhou, Shenyang)
- 95.0 (in Changsha (05:00-01:00 next day), Hengyang, Shuangfeng (Loudi), Xiangtan, and Zhuzhou)
- 95.1 (in Mianyang)
- 95.2 (in Huaihua)
- 95.3 (in Baoji)
- 95.5 (in Sanya)
- 95.6 (in Shijiazhuang, Wuhan)
- 95.7 (in Ningbo)
- 95.8 (in Huizhou, Nanjing, Sanming, Shenzhen, and Hong Kong)
- 95.9 (in Ganzhou)
- 96.4 (in Qujing, Xi'an, and Yinchuan)
- 96.5 (in Qinhuangdao)
- 96.7 (in Shaoyang, Weifang)
- 96.9 (in Baotou, Quanzhou, and Kinmen of Taiwan)
- 97.0 (in Taiyuan)
- 97.1 (in Hohhot, Jiayuguan)
- 97.4 (in Jining)
- 97.7 (in Qiqihar, Yantai, and Zhangzhou)
- 97.9 (in Yingkou)
- 98.0 (in Jilin)
- 98.2 (in Meizhou)
- 98.3 (in Jiaxing)
- 98.9 (in Tianshui, Yibin)
- 99.0 (in Hanzhong, Shanghai)
- 99.1 (in Changchun, Guang'an, Shaoyang, Zhuhai and Macau)
- 99.2 (in Shannan, Yangshuo (Guilin))
- 99.4 (in Shantou, Zigong)
- 99.5 (in Zhangjiakou)
- 100.0 (in Suzhou)
- 100.8 (in Fuxin)
- 101.0 (in Anshan)
- 101.2 (in Chaoyang, Shilong (Pingdingshan))
- 101.4 (in Chengde, Fushun, and Panzhihua)
- 101.5 (in Conghua (Guangzhou))
- 101.7 (in Zunyi)
- 101.8 (in Changzhi, Zhenjiang)
- 102.2 (in Changzhou, Jiangmen)
- 102.3 (in Jinzhou)
- 102.6 (in Xiamen, Zhangzhou, and Kinmen of Taiwan)
- 102.7 (in Huanren (Benxi))
- 102.9 (in Huludao, Tianjin, and Yan'an)
- 103.1 (in Wenzhou)
- 103.2 (in Changsha (05:00-23:00), Xiangtan, Yiyang, Yueyang, Yulin, and Zhuzhou)
- 103.5 (in Hulunbuir, Zhanjiang)
- 103.7 (in Chengdu)
- 103.9 (in Daqing, Shaoxing)
- 104.7 (in Liuzhou)
- 104.8 (in Tongliao)
- 104.9 (in Jinzhou, Yangquan)
- 105.0 (in Huangshi)
- 105.1 (in Xianyang)
- 105.2 (in Xiamen and Kinmen of Taiwan)
- 105.4 (in Dandong, Loudi (urban area, 05:00-24:00))
- 105.6 (in Karamay)
- 105.8 (in Haikou)
- 106.1 (in Beijing, Zhengzhou)
- 106.2 (in Nanning, Weihai)
- 106.3 (in Kaifeng)
- 106.4 (in Tonghua)
- 106.7 (in Baicheng)
- 106.8 (in Mudanjiang)
- 107.0 (in Kunming)
- 107.1 (in Yonghou)
- 107.5 (in Jingdezhen, Siping)
- 107.6 (in Datong)

== Major programs ==
- News and newspapers Summary (新闻和报纸摘要)
- National News Simulcast (全国新闻联播)
- News Live (新闻进行时)
- Winning Moment (决胜时刻)
- News Hyperlink (新闻超链接)
- Memory of China (记录中国)
- News Opinions (新闻有观点)
- Evening News Live (新闻晚高峰)
- News Focus (新闻纵横)
- Zhao Hua Xi Shi (朝花夕拾), a program about traditional cultures.
