= Lhasa Television =

Chinese television network

Lhasa TV (Chinese: 拉萨电视台), Lhasa Radio and Television (Chinese: 拉萨广播电视台), or Lhasa Television, is a television channel based in Lhasa, the capital of Tibet. The channel's station is the world's highest-altitude television station, headquartered at No. 22 Jiangsu East Road in the Chengguan District of Lhasa, Tibet Autonomous Region.

== History ==
Lhasa TV began broadcasting on December 25, 1984, broadcasting on VHF channel 10. Since October 1996, it has also provided cable television services. The station currently operates three channels, offering programs in both Chinese and Tibetan languages. On March 28, 2013, Lhasa Radio and Television expanded its services by launching a Tibetan Comprehensive Channel and a Culture and Tourism Channel.

For the Tibetan newscasts, presenters speak in a hybrid accent with nasal intonations similar to those found in Mandarin.

== See also ==
- China Tibet Broadcasting
