= The Harvard Independent =

Weekly newspaper at Harvard University

- Type: Student newspaper
- School: Harvard University
- President: Mia Tavares
- Editor-in-chief: Rania Jones
- Founded: 1969
- Website: https://harvardindependent.com/

The Harvard Independent colloquially known as “The Indy” is a weekly newspaper produced by undergraduate students at Harvard University.

== Origin and history ==
The Independent was founded in 1969 by students and alumni who felt the campus needed an alternative to The Harvard Crimson. The Crimson at the time reflected the left-wing turn of student organizations throughout the nation in the 1960s, and the founders of the Independent felt politically alienated from Crimson editors. The Independent no longer has any political affiliation.

As the decades passed, the weekly newspaper, released every Thursday and distributed both on the Internet and to Harvard College student dormitories, the format morphed to that of an alternative weekly rather than a standard newspaper, with illustrated covers and four main sections: News, Sports, Arts, and the Forum (Op-Ed) section. In addition, the Independent also has several themed issues each year, including the annual The Game issue for the Harvard-Yale game, the Weed Issue, and the Sex Issue, featuring the results of a campus-wide anonymous survey on sexual practices and opinions at Harvard.

According to Harvard's Campus Hazing Transparency Report, the Independent was investigated and found responsible for a hazing policy violation in that occurred in April 2025. The report described the incident: "New members of the organization were lined up, had eggs thrown at them and then covered in honey."

== Notable alumni ==
- Stephen J. Adler, president and editor-in-chief of Reuters
- Matthew Yglesias, co-founder of Vox and founder of Slow Boring
- Thomas G. Stemberg, Staples founder
- Jill Abramson, former Executive Editor of The New York Times
- Ben Mezrich, author of The Accidental Billionaires
- Scott Stossel, editor of The Atlantic magazine
- Keith Law, senior baseball writer for The Athletic
- Richard Tofel, general manager of ProPublica
- Trevor Potter, former chairman of the Federal Election Commission and founder of the Campaign Legal Center
- Amy Finkelstein, winner of the John Bates Clark Medal
- Kannon Shanmugam, Supreme Court litigator
