= Quiet American =

Quiet American may refer

- Quiet American (horse) (1986–2016), an American thoroughbred racehorse
- The Quiet American, a 1955 novel by Graham Greene
  - The Quiet American (1958 film), a film starring Audie Murphy and Michael Redgrave
  - The Quiet American (2002 film), a film starring Michael Caine and Brendan Fraser
