= Silencing =

Silencing may refer to:

- Bribery; an idiomatic use
- Censorship, silencing in politics
- Gene silencing, a genetic technique
- Motion silencing illusion
- Murder, the extreme colloquial variant

== See also ==
- Silence
