= El Silencio, Panama =

El Silencio
- Interactive map of El Silencio
- Location within Panama
- Coordinates: 9°22′48″N 82°31′48″W
- Country: Panama
- Province: Bocas del Toro

Population (2008)
  - Total: 1 101

El Silencio is a town in the Bocas del Toro Province of Panama.

== Sources ==
- World Gazeteer: Panama – World-Gazetteer.com
