= Mission-based organization =

Synonym for nonprofit

Mission-based organization is often used as an alternative to terms such as non-profit and non-governmental organization. Mission-based organizations range from formally incorporated foundations and philanthropic agencies to informal neighborhood groups that undertake an ad hoc project.

They may be faith-based organizations, or secular organizations assisting in neighborhood welfare or improvement.
