= Silent (band) =

Brazilian rock band

- Origin: Rio de Janeiro, Brazil
- Genres: AOR, rock
- Years active: 1991–present
- Label: Cave Records
- Members: Gustavo Andriewiski (guitar and vocals) Alex Cavalcanti (guitar); Douglas Boiago (bass) Luiz "Tilly" Alexandre (drums)
- Past members: Alexandre França (Guitars) Federico Martin (Vocal and Bass) Marcos Ferraz (bass) Leandro Baliza (keyboard)

Silent is a Brazilian arena rock band from Rio de Janeiro, Brazil.

== Biography ==
Silent is a Brazilian rock band imagined and created in February 1991 by Gus Andriew (Gustavo Andriewiski). The goal was to start a band that in two months would already have material ready to be presented in a first concert. For that he summoned friends, like L.A. Tilly who had already been on past musical ventures, on the drums, followed by Marcoz Ferraz on the bass, and lastly Alexandre França on lead guitar. In two months SILENT was ready and able to perform. Their first show was on April 25 of 1991, in the once renowned but now closed Babilônia (night club and concert hall). The concert brought in a crowd of about 900 people. Two months passed and they recorded their first demo, and in January of 92 SILENT shot their first music video (For the song Watching), that was selected to premier on MTV Brazil's show called “Demo MTV” and was included in the regular channel programing. In 93 Marcoz left the band, being replaced by Federico Arana, on the bass and vocals. In the same year SILENT starred in the sound track of a Brazilian soap opera called “O Mapa da Mina”, produced by Rede Globo de Televisão. In the following years that would repeat itself, in 96 and 97, which finally lead to the release of the album “The Bright Side” in 2001, that received raved reviews from around the world, even scoring an 83 grade in the well-known Japanese magazine Burnn. That year also marked the leave of Gustavo Andriewiski from the band. From 2002 to 2005 the band tried to reinvent itself and release new material, but all of these efforts were in vain, and the band broke up.

== Before The Comeback ==
In 2006 Gustavo, Alexandre França and Tilly rejoined in a modern Brazilian rock act called 'Repplica'. At first they had André Bighinzolli (Genoma, Metalmorphose) playing the bass, later replaced by Márcio Chicralla (Celso Blues Boy Band). This project ended in 2010.

== The Comeback ==
In December 2010, Gustavo, Alexandre, and Tilly, found themselves on a bar table throwing around ideas, when Alexandre suggested that they should give new life to the once forgotten idea of SILENT, and they decided to schedule their first come back rehearsal after the holidays, in January 2011. Destiny had a different plan, and, Alexandre França died alongside his wife and his son, in one of the worst natural disasters of Brazilian history. After one year of grieving, Gustavo and Tilly decided to carry on with their friend's plan. 2012 and 2013 were dedicated to forming a new quartet, and rerecording old songs from the original repertoire of the first years of the band, and also composing new songs.

== Reborn ==
With a new formation defined in 2014, Gustavo Andriewiski on guitar and vocals, Alex Cavalcanti on guitar, Douglas Boiago on the bass, and Luiz “Tilly” Alexandre on the drums, they start recording their second album. In 2015, with their new album “Land Of Lightning” ready, videos from the beginning of their careers salvaged, and a new single/music video ready to be released, the band signed their first contract with the recording label Planet Music Brazil. The single "Around The Sun" was released in October 2015, followed by the Album "Land Of Lightning", released on November. Soon after that, the video clip for "Around The Sun" is released on Vevo and in their Silent Vevo YouTube channel.

== Line-up ==
=== Members ===
- Vocals, guitar: Gustavo Andriewiski
- Guitar: Alex Cavalcanti
- Bass: Roberto Souza
- Drums: Luiz "Tilly" Alexandre

=== Former members ===
- Bass: Marcos Ferraz
- Keyboards: Leandro Baliza
- Guitar: Alexandre França
- Bass: Federico Martin
- Bass: Douglas Boiago

== Discography ==
- The Bright Side (2001)
- Land Of Lightning (2015)
- Fragmennts (2020)
