= Quiet Revolution (company) =

Companies based in Rockland County, New York

Quiet Revolution LLC
- Type: Private
- Founded: June 2015
- Founders: Susan Cain, Paul Scibetta
- Headquarters: Nyack, New York, United States
- Services: Management consulting, human resource management consulting
- Website: quietrev.com

Quiet Revolution LLC is a privately owned, mission-based, for-profit, American company formed with a stated mission "to unlock the power of introverts for the benefit of us all." The company has initiatives for business, government, office space planning, education, lifestyle and parenting. Quiet Revolution was formally launched in 2015 based on principles in Susan Cain's 2012 book Quiet: The Power of Introverts in a World That Can't Stop Talking.

== Background ==
On January 24, 2012, Susan Cain published the non-fiction book Quiet: The Power of Introverts in a World That Can't Stop Talking, becoming the focus of Time magazine's February 6, 2012 cover article and delivering a February 28, 2012 TED talk whose video reached its first million views faster than any previous TED video. Her work became widely known, with Quiet reaching The New York Times Best Seller list for non-fiction and, through August 2015, selling two million copies. Cain delivered over 100 speeches, sometimes receiving five figures for an appearance, as well as doing pro bono presentations.

Cain had been considering simply writing a second book on a different topic, but reader feedback convinced her that there was more to be done for introverts. After receiving the advice of author and marketer Seth Godin concerning what would actually change peoples’ lives, Cain decided instead to formally found a Quiet Revolution organization. Cain had informally urged people to join “the Quiet Revolution” as early as March 2012 on her thepowerofintroverts.com website, before it was subsumed under the formal company's quietrev.com website in 2015.

== Structure, principals and facilities ==
Cain's second TED Talk (March 2014) formally announced Quiet Revolution as a "venture backed, mission-based" company. First headquartered near Nyack, New York and later in a Harlem brownstone, it is a for-profit company, having raised US$4.5 million in startup capital. Cain co-founded the company with Paul Scibetta, a former senior executive at J. P. Morgan Chase. As a management training arm within Quiet Revolution, Cain and Scibetta set up a Quiet Leadership Institute with chief executive (July 2015) Mike Erwin, a former professor of leadership and psychology at the U.S. Military Academy. Early members of the Board of Advisors included Douglas Conant (Campbell Soup former CEO), Adam Grant (Wharton School of Business) and Amy Cuddy (Harvard Business School).

Quiet Revolution's facilities and practices incorporate non-traditional elements, including operating from a Victorian house facing the Hudson River, and having a policy that meetings not start before 12:30 p.m. By explicit design, the company hires a blend of introverts (like Cain) and extroverts (like Scibetta). As of August 2015 Quiet Revolution had a 12-person team, plus over thirty writers providing content for the company website.

== Mission and processes ==
Quiet Revolution website's mission statement is "to unlock the power of introverts for the benefit of us all." The overarching goal of the company has been described as rebalancing the power between extroverts and introverts.

Quiet Revolution targets broad categories such as children, life, and work. Stated initiatives include transforming office architecture to combat the erosion of focus and privacy in modern offices, using the Quiet Leadership Institute to help organizations train introverted leaders, and empowering quiet children. More concretely, the company formed an online education course for parents, a co-branded lifestyle section in The Huffington Post, a podcast, a website to support a community including writers and advocates, and young-adult books and shows whose heroines are quiet leaders. The Quiet Schools Network was formed with a stated mission to create Quiet Schools that are characterized by "an inclusive culture in which everyone is recognized for their potential to learn and lead in authentic ways"; the network's member schools focus on topics such as modifying class participation models, using social media in education, designing schools' physical environments, and implementing approaches such as "think/pair/share" and peer-to-peer teaching.

The Quiet Leadership Institute arm of the company uses both in-person and online classes to help executives understand the strengths of introverted employees, harness their power, improve communication between introverts and extroverts, and run meetings so as not to be dominated by loud colleagues. The Institute partnered with office furniture design firm Steelcase to design Susan Cain Quiet Spaces, which are quiet- and privacy-conscious workspaces countering the trend toward open plan offices. At first the company focused on large clients (GE, P&G, NASA, LinkedIn), but expanded by early 2016 to small companies and entrepreneurial startups, advising on content for introvert-related management practices.

Quiet Revolution implemented a Quiet Ambassador initiative, involving the training of volunteers to be embedded in schools, businesses and other participating organizations. After training, ambassadors may advocate, for example, for fewer joint projects, more advance notice of meeting agendas, separate spaces for individual solitude, or fostering communication among co-workers of opposite temperament.

In schools, the Quiet Ambassador program tailors teaching and grading approaches to students' temperaments in preference to the conventional one-size-fits-all approach, and favors recognition of student engagement over conventional grading based on class participation. The program introduces "think–pair–share," in which students discuss their ideas with one other student before speaking to the full class.

== See also ==
- Susan Cain
- Quiet: The Power of Introverts in a World That Can't Stop Talking
- Extraversion and introversion
- Open plan
- Human resource management
