= Quiet: The Power of Introverts in a World That Can't Stop Talking =

Book by Susan Cain

- Author: Susan Cain
- Language: English
- Subject: Personality psychology; intrapersonal; interpersonal; self-help; success; management
- Genre: Nonfiction
- Publisher: Crown Publishing Group
- Publication date: January 24, 2012 (hardcover)
- Publication place: United States
- Media type: Hardcover; paperback (January 2013); Kindle edition; audio CD; Audible audio
- Pages: 333
- ISBN: 978-0-307-35214-9
- Followed by: Quiet Power

Quiet: The Power of Introverts in a World That Can't Stop Talking is a 2012 nonfiction book written by American author and speaker Susan Cain. Cain argues that modern Western culture misunderstands and undervalues the traits and capabilities of introverted people, leading to "a colossal waste of talent, energy, and happiness."

The book presents a history of how Western culture transformed from a culture of character to a culture of personality in which an "extrovert ideal" is dominant and introversion is viewed as inferior or even pathological. Adopting scientific definitions of introversion and extroversion as preferences for different levels of stimulation, Quiet outlines the advantages and disadvantages of each temperament, emphasizing the myth of the extrovert ideal that has dominated in the West since the early twentieth century. Asserting that temperament is a core element of human identity, Cain cites research in biology, psychology, neuroscience and evolution to demonstrate that introversion is both common and normal, noting that many of humankind's most creative individuals and distinguished leaders were introverts. Cain urges changes at the workplace, in schools, and in parenting; offers advice to introverts for functioning in an extrovert-dominated culture; and offers advice in communication, work, and relationships between people of differing temperament.

== Background ==
After graduating from Princeton University and Harvard Law School, Cain became a lawyer and negotiations consultant. She likened her tenure as a Wall Street lawyer to "time spent in a foreign country". Saying her interest in writing about introversion stemmed from her extreme difficulty with public speaking, Cain switched careers and began writing at home.

Seven years in the making, Cain's book, Quiet: The Power of Introverts in a World That Can't Stop Talking was published January 24, 2012. Asked what inspired her to write the book, Cain likened introverts today to women at the dawn of the feminist movement—second-class citizens with gigantic amounts of untapped talent. She said that our institutions are designed for extroverts, causing many introverts to believe that something is wrong with them and that they should try to 'pass' as extroverts. She concluded that this bias against introversion leads to "a colossal waste of talent, energy, and happiness", saying that it is "the next great diversity issue of our time".

== Content and concepts ==
Cain argues that modern Western culture misunderstands and undervalues the traits and capabilities of introverted people, employing academic research, supplemented with anecdotes, to describe how American culture got to this point.

=== The "Extrovert Ideal" ===
Cain says Western, and in particular, American, culture is dominated by what she calls the "Extrovert Ideal", described as "the omnipresent belief that the ideal self is gregarious, alpha and comfortable in the spotlight". Western societies, being based on the Greco-Roman ideal which praises oratory, favor the man of action over the man of contemplation, and view introversion as being between a disappointment and pathology. In contrast, traditional, pre-Americanized Asian culture is more inclined to value reticence and caution. The Harvard Independent's Faith Zhang remarked that Quiet seems in part a gentle rebuke to a culture that values style over substance.

=== Historical roots ===
Cain traces the historical roots of the Extrovert Ideal to the rise of industrial America in the late 19th century, before which a culture of character dominated, and after which "a perfect storm of big business, urbanization and mass immigration" changed America into what historian Warren Susman called a culture of personality, in which perception trumps truth. The Globe and Mail's Zosia Bielski described this transformation as being aligned with "the rise of the salesman" and "the move from morals to magnetism"—which Cain says has changed forever "who we are and whom we admire, how we act at job interviews and what we look for in an employee, how we court our mates and raise our children".

=== Pitfalls of the Extrovert Ideal ===
In general terms, Cain has stated that we cannot be in a group of people without instinctively mirroring each other, and groups follow the most charismatic person, even though there is no correlation between being a good speaker and having great ideas. Cain says collective thinking approaches not only favor dominant extroverts, but that relying on brainstorming is a mistake, arguing that serious original thought and the expertise that generates it are almost always individual. Cain cites physiological research showing that when people (not just introverts) oppose group consensus, their brains' amygdalae "light up"—signaling fear of rejection—thus discouraging potentially valuable individual contributions to the group. Cain cites research indicating that people are more creative when they enjoy privacy and freedom from interruption, the implication being that enforced teamwork can stifle creativity. As a concrete example of the risks of groupthink, Cain mentions juries, in which the desire for social cohesion can sometimes short-circuit justice. She suggests that the predominantly extroverted temperament of management in the investment and banking industries—which temperament involves dopamine-related reward seeking tendencies—may have contributed to the 2008 financial crisis.

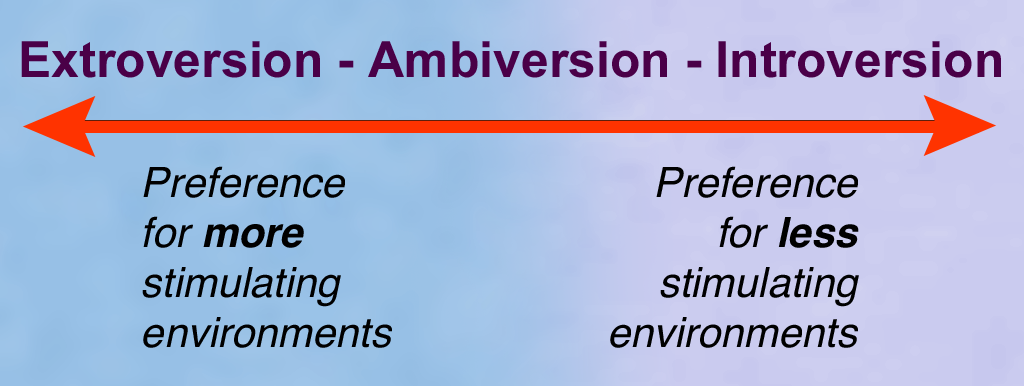
The introvert-extrovert spectrum: Cain defines introversion and extroversion in terms of preferences for different levels of stimulation.

=== Defining introversion ===
Various schools of psychology define introversion differently. Cain's definition is that introverts have a preference for a quiet, more minimally stimulating environment. Introverts tend to enjoy quiet concentration, listen more than they talk, and think before they speak, and have a more circumspect and cautious approach to risk. Introverts think more, are less reckless and focus on what really matters—relationships and meaningful work. Conversely, extroverts are energized by social situations and tend to be assertive multi-taskers who think out loud and on their feet. Cain notes that between one-third and one-half of Americans may be classified as introverts, though individuals fall at different places along an introvert-extrovert spectrum. People falling near the middle of the spectrum are called "ambiverts".

=== Distinguishing introversion ===
Cain distinguishes introversion from superficially similar personality traits, in particular charging the perceived identity between shyness and introversion to be a huge misconception. She explains that shyness is inherently uncomfortable but introversion is not. Crediting retired developmental psychologist Jerome Kagan, Quiet recognizes that there is not a single cause for a given behavior; there are many routes to behaviors such as being slow to warm up, shyness, and impulsivity. Cain distinguishes introversion—characterized by her as a preference for a quiet, more minimally stimulating environment—from being shy (a fear of negative judgment), from being anti-social (introverts and extroverts being differently social), and from autism (inability to read social cues and understand other minds not being characteristic of introverts.)

=== Core to our identities ===
Cain asserts that whether one is outwardly oriented to the surrounding world, or inwardly oriented to the inner riches of the mind, has as profound an effect as one's gender. Cain asserted that our lives are shaped as profoundly by personality as by gender or race, that the single most important aspect of personality is where we fall on the introvert-extrovert spectrum, and that one's place on this continuum "influences our choice of friends and mates, how we make conversation, resolve differences, and show love. It affects the careers we choose and whether or not we succeed at them."

=== Introverts acting as "pseudo-extroverts" ===
According to Cain, in a culture that is biased against them, introverts are pressured to act like extroverts instead of embracing their serious, often quiet and reflective style. Cain's research included visits to what she termed three nerve centers of the Extrovert Ideal—a Tony Robbins self-help seminar, the Harvard Business School, and a megachurch—noting the discomfort and struggles experienced by introverts in those environments and "shining a light" on the bias against introversion. She said that people have to act out of our true character sometimes but that it is not healthy to act out of one's true character most or all of the time: "Whenever you try to pass as something you're not, you lose a part of yourself along the way. You especially lose a sense of how to spend your time."

However, Cain essentially adopts the "Free Trait Theory" of Dr. Brian Little, agreeing that introverts are capable of acting like extroverts for (core personal goals)—work they consider important, people they love, or anything they value highly—provided they also grant themselves restorative niches, which are places to go and time to be their real selves. Also, in a February 2012 article, Cain listed six self-help strategies introverts may use to nourish their strengths, including "talking deeply", working alone, reading others' works ("a deeply social act"), listening well, taking mini-breaks from overstimulating environments, and practicing "quiet commitment".

Core to our identities

Our lives are shaped as profoundly by personality as by gender or race. And the single most important aspect of personality ... is where we fall on the introvert-extrovert spectrum. Our place on this continuum influences our choice of friends and mates, how we make conversation, resolve differences, and show love. It affects the careers we choose and whether or not we succeed at them.

— "The North and South of Temperament"
Pages 2–3 of Quiet

=== Physiology of temperament ===
Cain maintains that there are introverts and extroverts in almost every species of the animal kingdom, each having a corresponding survival strategy. She says that research indicates our own degree of introversion or extroversion is detectable in infants and likely to be innate, and about 50% heritable (half by nature, half by nurture). Babies who are more highly reactive (more sensitive) to stimulation are more likely to develop into introverts, while less reactive (less sensitive) babies generally become extroverts who actually draw on the energy around them. Introverts appear to be less responsive than extroverts to dopamine (a brain chemical linked to reward-driven learning), and have a more circumspect and cautious approach to risk than do extroverts. Introverts are more governed by the neocortex, the part of the brain responsible for thinking, planning, language and decision making.

=== In the workplace ===
Concerning the workplace, Quiet critiques today's perceived overemphasis on collaboration: brainstorming leading to groupthink, and meetings leading to organizational inertia. Cain urges changes to the workplace to make it less focused on what she terms "The New Groupthink"—the idea that creativity and productivity emerge from a necessarily gregarious place—and more conducive to deep thought and solo reflection. According to Cain, research shows that charismatic leaders earn bigger paychecks but do not have better corporate performance; that brainstorming results in lower quality ideas and the more vocally assertive extroverts are the most likely to be heard; that the amount of space allotted to each employee has shrunk 60% since the 1970s; and that open office plans are associated with reduced concentration and productivity, impaired memory, higher turnover and increased illness. Cain says that the more creative people tend to be "socially poised introverts", solitude is a crucial and underrated ingredient for creativity, and office designs and work plans should allow people to be alone as well as to socialize.

=== Personal relationships ===
Cain has noted that people of different temperament who become involved in personal relationships can encounter misunderstanding and conflict. After a day's work an introvert may need to quietly recharge, while the extrovert may find the introvert's withdrawal hurtful; conversely, the extrovert may want to jointly socialize with others, which the introvert may find exhausting. Cain advises, first, a mutual understanding of where the other party is coming from; and second, balancing their respective needs for socializing and for solitude in a practical compromise in how the couple connects and how the couple jointly socializes with others.

=== Education and child development ===
Cain describes how introversion in children is not a defect but instead may involve a careful, sensitive temperament that may bring stronger academics, enhanced creativity and a unique brand of leadership and empathy. Cain says that introverts win a disproportionate number of Phi Beta Kappa keys and National Merit Scholarship finalist positions, cheat and break rules less, are more likely to be described by parents and caregivers as empathetic or conscientious, and are less likely to get into car accidents, participate in extreme sports and place large financial bets. Cain advises that students need more privacy and autonomy, and should be taught to work together but also how to work alone. Judith Warner, an author of parenting books, approved of Cain's advice that parents should view introverted children's social style with understanding rather than fear.

=== Balance ===
Cain is not seeking introvert domination but a better balance and inclusion of different work styles, acknowledging that big ideas and great leadership can come from either personality type. Cain cites studies showing that introverts are better at leading proactive employees because they listen to and let them run with their ideas, while extroverts are better at leading passive employees because they have a knack for motivation and inspiration. Cain has emphasized that the key to maximizing talents is to put yourself into the zone of stimulation that is right for you. The Harvard Independent's Faith Zhang closed her review of Quiet with the observation that Cain's point is not that introverts are inherently superior or that we should all shroud ourselves in solitude, but that diversity provides balance and makes for a fuller, richer world.

=== The future ===
Cain asserts that introverts today are where women were in the 1950s and early 1960s—a population discounted for something that went to the core of who they were, but a population on the verge of coming into its own. She adds that we're at the cusp of a real sea change in the way we understand this personality type, Cain's own website urging readers to "join the Quiet Revolution". Beyond urging consciousness-raising about the harmfulness of culture's bias against introversion, Cain urged companies to rethink hiring and promotion policies and office design, and encouraged educators to avoid constant group work and be trained in recognizing varieties of temperament to support quieter children to be functional and achieving for what they are rather than trying to "turn them into extroverts". Cain further urged research into determining which situations are best suited to introverts and extroverts and how they can most effectively partner with each other.

== Related lectures and publications ==
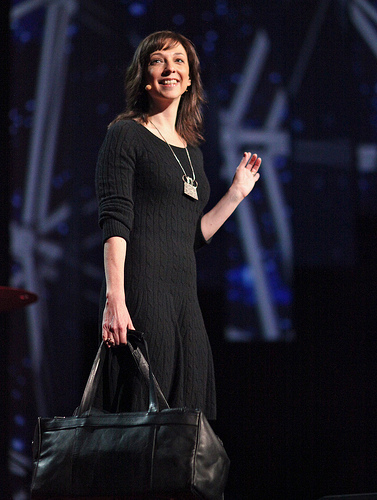
Cain speaking at the TED2012 conference with a prop suitcase.

Cain presented talks at the TED2012 Conference and TED 2014 (All-Stars). In 2015, Cain formally co-founded Quiet Revolution, a mission-based company based on the principles in Quiet, and in 2016 published her second book, Quiet Power: The Secret Strengths of Introverts, directed to children and teens and their educators and parents.

== Influence ==
Within one week of its publication, Forbes' Jenna Goudreau noted that the book was featured by several major media outlets and was shared extensively across the Web. Goudreau observed that "readers said they felt validated and seen for the first time". Within three weeks of publication, InformationWeek's Debra Donston-Miller noted that introversion and extroversion were being widely discussed due in large part to Quiet, Cain's work being the focus of Time magazine's February 6, 2012 cover article. In 2015, Laura Holson wrote in The New York Times that Cain had "started, or at least was on the forefront of, a bona fide publishing trend" concerning introverts, and in 2017 Harvard Magazine's Lydialyle Gibson noted that in the aftermath of Quiet, "introversion came suddenly into vogue". Similarly, a 2019 Scientific American article related how "introverts have been having their moment" since Quiet's 2012 publication.

By 2016, Quiet had been translated into over forty languages.

Elaine Aron, Ph.D., author of The Highly Sensitive Person (1996), responded to Quiet and its related Time cover story by stating that Cain was in fact describing highly sensitive persons (HSPs, defined in terms of sensory processing sensitivity) and not introverts (which Aron says is recently becoming defined more narrowly in terms of social interaction). Though Aron wrote that Cain and others blurred the lines between sensitivity and introversion, Aron called the Time article "a huge, huge step" for understanding HSPs, and that as more is learned, the 30% of HSPs who are social extroverts will be better understood.

Changes caused by Quiet include Steelcase collaborating with Cain (2014) to design office spaces to include quiet areas where workers can have privacy for a time, in contrast to open plan offices, and Herman Miller matching work models (e.g., impromptu chats, team status-report huddles, and concentrated individual work) with physical settings (e.g., bench desk, small meeting room, open forum). The ABA Journal's Leslie A. Gordon wrote in early 2016 that, "thanks largely to interest generated by Cain's book", law schools and law firms were using introversion preferences to influence hiring, placement, and training of attorneys.

Psychologist Christopher Peterson wrote that even professional positive psychologists may be implicitly perpetuating "The Extrovert Ideal", for example, by privileging activated feelings like happiness while undervaluing quiet feelings like contentment. Writing that both views of psychological wellness—both the noisy and extroverted view, and a quiet and introverted view—deserve scientific attention, Peterson closed by calling for a "quiet positive psychology".

GigaOM's Jessica Stillman extended the concepts of Quiet to analyze coworking (working independently but in the same environment as others), remote working, and other "workshifting" (non-traditional worksite) arrangements, noting that such arrangements pose both benefits and dangers for introverts. While coworkers can "set their own level of contact", she noted that "the ability to work from anywhere might enable more withdrawal than is healthy among introverts". She also echoed the cautionary argument that "too often ... we choose our work environment on autopilot."

As the November 2012 U.S. presidential election approached, Quiet's concepts were applied to contrast former President Clinton with 2012 candidates Barack Obama and Mitt Romney, Cain having noted that both Obama and Romney were introverts. Concerning leadership in general, Cain adopted Peter Drucker's statement that effective leaders "had little or no 'charisma' and little use either for the term or what it signifies."

Cornell Law School's Sherry Colb extended to the jury system Quiet's assertion that a successful "wisdom-of-crowds phenomenon" typically emerges when individuals in a group share their respective contributions after being separately and independently conceived. Colb proposed a jury system in which, after all evidence has been presented, respective jurors would compose written analyses of the facts and issues, and express a verdict; the jurors' various documents would be distributed and read by all other jurors before in-person deliberation would begin.

In the wake of the December 14, 2012 Sandy Hook Elementary School (Newtown) shooting, Quiet's author was cited for the concern that introverted people, or people who are quiet for other reasons, receive unfair suspicion or stigmatization because of violent acts committed by a few solitary individuals. Quiet's critiques of groupwork and brainstorming were cited in the writings of such sources as Harvard Business School's Professor Emeritus James Heskett and Fast Company's Co.Design senior editor Belinda Lanks. After Yahoo!'s February 2013 announcement of discontinuation of a remote work option for employees, Quiet was cited by NBC News' Isolde Raftery for its concern that creativity would be hindered, and by The Miami Herald's Leonard Pitts Jr. against the belief that synergy always produces the best results, and against the one-size-fits-all mentality that says productivity and creativity are found only when colleagues meet at the water cooler.

Quiet was chosen as the common reading choice for Case Western Reserve University's 2013–2014 "First Year Experience" program which helps new students transition to university life and develop connections, the chair of the university's common reading committee explaining that the book will encourage students to reflect on what kinds of learners and professionals they will be, and how they fit in socially and relate to others.

Three years after Quiet's publication, David DiSalvo wrote in Forbes that a "groundswell support for the book's thesis" resulted in "a sort of cultish affinity for introversion", but cautioned that "as with all movement-making arguments", they have "fueled ... shallow conclusions" that were not made in the book itself. DiSalvo cited studies indicating that introverts' elevated sensitivity to personality traits can manifest as bias against extroverts in performance appraisals and reward giving.

Ten years after Quiet's publication, a Washington Post reviewer wrote that Quiet had become "a resounding success with readers, book clubs, universities and professional conferences, and transformed Cain into an unlikely but essential thought leader in a new era of self-help writing."

== Reception ==
The Wall Street Journal's Philip Delves Broughton reviewed Quiet as "an earnest and enlightening 300-page inquiry into introversion and its uses", described examples of the research and investigations Cain undertook, and concluded that "Ms. Cain's rich, intelligent book will probably have broad appeal."

The Harvard Independent's Faith Zhang remarked that "though it draws on studies across a variety of fields, including psychology, sociology, and neurology, Quiet is not even a pop science book; it is part affirmation, part social commentary, part self-help primer, supported by but not primarily focused on science". Zhang found flaw in generalizations in Quiet's "Soft Power" chapter on East Asian culture, but found the book's most interesting chapter to be the one tracing the social history describing the shift from the "culture of character" to the "culture of personality". Zhang concluded that "Quiet has much to offer both introverts and the extroverts who would like to understand them". Jenny Lee subsequently wrote in the Asian American magazine Hyphen that Zhang's brief critique of Quiet's "Soft Power" chapter was the exception among reviews; Lee further asserted that despite its disclaimer about not encouraging ethno-cultural stereotypes, Cain's chapter overgeneralized about Asian and Asian American personality styles and reinforced the "model minority myth".

In Scientific American, Gareth Cook described Quiet as "part book, part manifesto".

The Chicago Tribune said that "Quiet is not a scientific tract. But Cain ... draws from a wide array of academic research, enlivened with colorful anecdotes, to describe how American culture got to this point."

Writing in The New York Times, Judith Warner gave Quiet a mixed review, to which Cain blogged a response the same day. Concerning Quiet's writing form, Warner commented that Quiet is "a long and ploddingly earnest book", and contains "go-go language" and "gratuitous sloganeering ... (that) offsets Cain's serious research rather badly". Warner also stated that Cain "combines on-the-scenes reporting with a wide range of social science research and a fair bit of 'quiet power' cheerleading". Cain replied to Warner's critique of the book's content: Warner asserted that Quiet's definition of introversion expanded to include "all that is wise and good, (so) that (the definition) is largely meaningless except as yet another vehicle for promoting self-esteem"; Cain replied that "Warner badly misunderstands" that the traits listed in Quiet's "Author's Note" were not descriptive of introversion "but that culturally these traits have always been bound together under the 'contemplation' rubric, and need to be addressed as such." Warner hypothesized that, had Cain focused in "other sorts of places" than "Harvard Business School, corporate boardrooms, executive suites", that Cain "would undoubtedly have discovered a world of introverts quite contented with who they are"; Cain replied that her research and feedback confirm introverts' "difficult experiences" even in fields that "Warner imagines are safe havens for introverts", and added that Warner's response to Quiet "has an interesting precedent in the early years of feminism... (in which) a distinct minority felt proud and content as they were, and couldn't see what all the fuss was about".

Philosopher and author Damon Young, writing in The Age, wrote that "Cain is patient, meticulous and empathetic on the psychology. She outlines the problems clearly and gives workable solutions. She is less nimble with questions of history and society. For example, her use of a handful of quotes and aphorisms to demonstrate Eastern and Western outlooks on speech is clumsy. Her prose is plain but warm and she distils research well, with the use of anecdotes and literary examples."

Ravi Chandra wrote in Psychology Today that Quiet was "a worthwhile read, but problematic in particulars." Chandra also wrote, "...one chapter especially stuck in my craw. Soft Power: Asian-Americans and the Extrovert Ideal falls short of the understanding, validation, and broad-minded sensitivity which Cain champions."

=== Distinctions and recognition ===
Bestseller list placement (hardcover nonfiction category unless otherwise noted): Quiet reached:

- No. 1 on the NPR Bestseller List,
- No. 3 on the Los Angeles Times Best Seller list,
- No. 3 on The Washington Post Book World bestsellers list,
- No. 4 on The New York Times Best Seller list being on the list (top 15) for sixteen weeks,
- No. 12 best selling book (across all categories) on Amazon.com (March 3, 2012, not necessarily a peak ranking),
- No. 2 on The New York Times Best Seller list (paperback nonfiction), by March 2019 having been on the list for 166 weeks,
- No. 1 bestselling original nonfiction book of 2012 as listed by the Toronto Star, and
- No. 7 on The Wall Street Journal bestselling e-book list (December 2017)

Quiet was voted No. 1 nonfiction book of 2012 in the "Goodreads Choice Awards".

John Dupuis collated information from 69 "Best of 2012" book lists, and wrote for the National Geographic Society's ScienceBlogs that Quiet was the most listed science related book.

"Best of 2012 List" inclusions, not limited to science book lists:

- Guardian First Book Award 2012 Longlist (one of four nonfiction books)
- Fast Company (twelve best business books)
- The Guardian/The Observer (ten best psychology books)
- Kirkus Reviews (100 best nonfiction)
- The Christian Science Monitor (No. 7 best nonfiction)
- O, The Oprah Magazine (nineteen best books)
- New Zealand Listener (100 best books)
- Inc. (nine best books for entrepreneurs)
- British Psychological Society's (twelve best psychology books)
- People (top ten books)
- New York Post (ten best career-related books)
- author Gillian Flynn on Today ("The Today Show") (top ten books for holiday gifts)
- Inside Higher Ed (eleven best nonfiction)
- Greater Good Science Center editors (ten favorite books)
- Mitch Joel in The Montreal Gazette (ten best business books)
- "Mommy Data" feature of Psychology Today (seven best parenting books).

In 2018, The Guardian listed the book as among the ten "best brainy books of the decade.".

By 2022, Cain's first TED Talk video had been viewed over 30 million times.

By 2022, four million copies of Quiet had been sold, and had been translated into 40 languages.

== Notable individuals described by Cain as introverts ==
Notable individuals described by Cain as introverts, or whose notability is based on introverted personality characteristics:

- Abraham Lincoln, Eleanor Roosevelt, Rosa Parks, Marcel Proust, Frédéric Chopin, Charles Darwin, Steve Wozniak, Mother Teresa, Gandhi
- Steven Spielberg, J.K. Rowling, Charles Schulz, Bill Gates
- Barack Obama, Mitt Romney, Ron Paul
- Dale Carnegie, Albert Einstein, Dr. Seuss
- Warren Buffett, Al Gore, Larry Page
- Charles R. Schwab
- David Letterman, Barbara Walters
- Isaac Newton
- Pablo Picasso ("Without great solitude, no serious work is possible")
- W. B. Yeats, J. M. Barrie, George Orwell
- "Seekers"—Moses, Jesus, Buddha
- Johnny Carson, Meryl Streep, Tom Hanks, Steve Martin

== See also ==
- Quiet Revolution (company)
- Quiet Power, directed to children and teens
- The Highly Sensitive Person (book) (Elaine Aron)
- Myers–Briggs Type Indicator
- Big Five personality traits
- Personality psychology
- Personality type
- Analytical psychology
- Trait theory
- Reinforcement sensitivity theory
- Cultural neuroscience
- Neurodiversity

== Further reading and media ==
Further reading: (alphabetically)

- D'Arcy, Janice, "Parenting an introvert in an extrovert's world" (archive), The Washington Post, February 1, 2012.
- Tierney, John, "From Cubicles, Cry for Quiet Pierces Office Buzz" (archive), The New York Times, May 19, 2012.
- Vaughan, Bernard, "Give us some space, and respect, proud introvert argues", Reuters, February 13, 2012.

Links to video and audio media: (chronologically)

- Cain's January 30, 2012 interview at NPR (archive) (interview highlights in text)
- Cain's February 28, 2012 TED Talk (video) at the TED2012 Conference (archive) ● Same talk on the TED.com website (archive)
- Cain's March 27, 2012 interview (audio) at the Royal Society of Arts (RSA) (archive) ● Portion of same interview (video) in theRSAorg's YouTube channel (archive)
- "Susan Cain takes us into the mind of an introvert" (June 2019), TED interview

Miscellaneous:

- SusanCain.net
