= Radio jamming in China =

Form of censorship conducted by the People's Republic of China

Radio jamming in China is a form of censorship in the People's Republic of China that involves deliberate attempts by state or Communist Party organs to interfere with radio broadcasts. In most instances, radio jamming targets foreign broadcasters, including Voice of America (VOA), the BBC World Service, Sound of Hope (SOH) and stations based in Taiwan.

== Methods ==
Radio jamming is achieved by transmitting radio signals on the same frequency as the intended target. The government of the People's Republic of China disrupts shortwave radio communications through this method, typically by broadcasting music, drumming, or other noise. On shortwave, the jamming sound is usually composed of Chinese folk music, specifically a composition known as The Firedrake, running one hour in duration. The one hour audio clip is sourced from the ChinaSat 6B satellite (launched in 2007) and transmitted by relay stations on the same frequencies used by target stations. High quality recordings of The Firedrake also exist on the internet. On some occasions, China National Radio broadcasts are also used to jam target signals.

The French defense electronics company Thales Group was accused of aiding Chinese censorship efforts by selling shortwave broadcasting equipment to Chinese authorities in 2008. The firm denied this, saying that the sale of equipment was for civil purposes.

== Targets ==
=== Voice of America and Radio Free Asia ===
Since broadcasting began in 1996, Chinese authorities have consistently jammed Radio Free Asia broadcasts. In 2002, the Broadcasting Board of Governors reported that "virtually all of VOA's and RFA's shortwave radio transmissions directed to China [...] are jammed," including their Mandarin, Cantonese, Tibetan, and Uyghur language services. In 2025, Radio Free Asia halted radio broadcasts in Mandarin and Tibetan.

=== Voice of Tibet ===
In 2008, the Oslo-based Voice of Tibet reported that jamming of its radio communications intensified during the 2008 Tibetan unrest, as authorities increased the number of disrupted signals it employed to block outside transmissions.

=== Others ===
Other targets for jamming include the BBC World Service, Radio Taiwan International, and the Falun Gong-affiliated Sound of Hope radio network.

== Response ==
In 2011, some international radio broadcasters, including both the BBC and VOA, announced plans to scale down or close their Mandarin shortwave services for China due to spending cuts and frustrations caused by jamming efforts. The BBC and VOA instead chose to invest more heavily in Internet radio; both received financial support from the U.S. Department of State to fund and research Internet censorship-circumvention software, such as Freegate and Ultrasurf, to enable their Chinese audience to access their programs online.

Broadcasters have also sought to educate their audiences on the use of anti-jamming technology.

== See also ==
- Censorship in the People's Republic of China
- Radio jamming
  - Radio jamming in Korea
