= China Tibet Broadcasting =

Chinese radio network

China Tibet Broadcasting (Chinese: 西藏人民广播电台; pinyin: Xīzàng Rénmín Guǎngbò Diàntái; CTB) is a broadcast network headquartered in Lhasa, Tibet Autonomous Region of the People's Republic of China. Its radio programmes were founded in 1959. Its English language audio broadcast is called Holy Tibet, broadcasts at 07:00 and 16:00 UTC every day.

The official website is "Voice of Tibet" (Chinese: 中国西藏之声网; pinyin: Zhōngguó Xīzàng Zhīshēng Wǎng; Tibetan: བོད་ལྗོངས་འཕྲིན་དྲ།, Wylie: bod ljongs 'phrin dra). It comprises the CTB with and Tibet Television (Chinese: 西藏电视台; pinyin: Xīzàng Diànshìtái; XZTV).

China Tibet Broadcasting Radio Stations
English channel Name	Chinese channel name	Frequency	Fower
Standard Chinese radio	汉语广播	FM93.3; AM1377	FM:10 kW; AM:200 kW
Standard Tibetan radio	藏语广播	FM101.6; AM594	FM:10 kW; AM:200 kW
Kham Tibetan language radio	康巴话广播	FM103; AM783	FM:10 kW; AM:200 kW (2021–Present)
City life radio	都市生活广播	FM98	FM:10 kW
Educational radio	教育广播	FM106.3	FM:10 kW

== Broadcast time ==
Standard Chinese: 4:00 (Wednesday 5:00)–2:00 (next day)
Standard Tibatan: 4:50 (Wednesday 5:00)–2:00 (next day)
Kham Tibetan language: 6:00–0:00 (next day)
City life: 6:50–2:00 (next day)
Educational: 7:30–13:30 and 18:00–22:00

== History ==
Lhasa was served by a cable radio station from 1953 to 1958, the People's Broadcasting Station of Tibet, installed by the government. The existing Lhasa station borrowed a 3,5 kW shortwave transmitter on December 28, 1958 and converted to a wireless station on January 1, 1959. In 1973, the Mandarin and Tibetan programmes began to air on separate radio stations.

A preparing group for Tibetan television was created in October 1976, with the filming of a documentary, Jubilant Plateau, under the name "Tibet Television". The first test broadcast was conducted on May 1, 1978, in black and white. The same team started conducting color broadcasts on October 1, 1979.

Tibet Television under Voice of Tibet was launched on August 20, 1985, with the name being signed by Deng Xiaoping in Mandarin and Ngapoi Ngawang Jigme in Tibetan. At the time, it broadcast a one-channel general service in both languages. By the late 1990s, it was broadcasting two channels, channel 8 and channel 12, both in Lhasa, with Lhasa Television, owned by the city of Lhasa, is on channel 10.

== See also ==
- Voice of Tibet (Norway)
- Television in Tibet
