= Voice of Tibet (Norway) =

Voice of Tibet (Tibetan: ནོར་ཝེ་བོད་ཀྱི་རླུང་འཕྲིན་ཁང, Wylie: nor we bod kyi rlung 'phrin khang) is a radio station based in Norway transmitting shortwave radio programmes in the Tibetan language as well as Mandarin Chinese. The station began broadcasting on 14 May 1996 and was founded by three Norwegian NGOs: Norwegian Human Rights House, The Norwegian Tibet Committee and Worldview Rights. Its broadcasts target Tibet and China as well as India, Bhutan and Nepal. It receives funds from the United States National Endowment for Democracy.

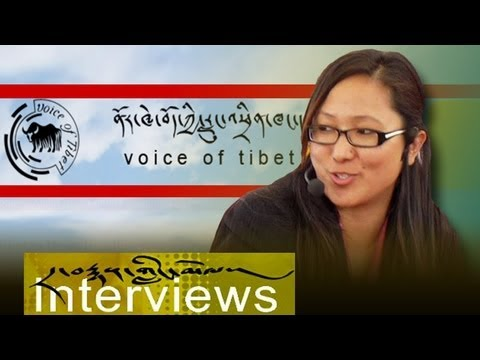
Tenzin Paldon, Editor-in-Chief at Voice of Tibet in 2013

Voice of Tibet states that its goal is to provide news on Tibetan life, culture, events, and issues both inside Tibet and in the global Tibetan exile community. They air the Dalai Lama's latest public speeches in serialised form. With a portion of programming targeting Chinese listeners, they report on democracy movements in China. They carry reports on environmental issues, health care (both traditional and modern), and global affairs.

Broadcasts of Voice of Tibet reach China and Tibet through transmitters in the Indian Ocean as well as in Russia and Central Asia.

== See also ==
- International Campaign for Tibet
- Radio Free Asia
- Radio jamming in China
- Voice of America
