= Susan Cain =

American writer (born 1968)

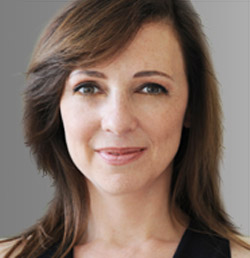
- Born: Susan Horowitz Cain; 1968; March 20, 1968 (age 58)
- Education: Princeton University (BA); Harvard University (JD)
- Occupations: Writer, former lawyer and negotiations consultant
- Writing career
- Language: English
- Genres: Success, Management, Education, Psychology, Self-Help, Interpersonal Relations
- Notable works: Quiet: The Power of Introverts in a World That Can't Stop Talking (January 24, 2012); Quiet Power: The Secret Strengths of Introverts (2016); Quiet Journal: Discover Your Secret Strengths and Unleash Your Inner Power (2020); Bittersweet: How Sorrow and Longing Make Us Whole (2022)
- Website: susancain.net

Susan Horowitz Cain (born 1968) is an American writer and lecturer.

She is the author of the 2012 non-fiction book Quiet: The Power of Introverts in a World That Can't Stop Talking, which argues that modern Western culture misunderstands and undervalues the traits and capabilities of introverted people. In 2015, she co-founded Quiet Revolution, a mission-based company with initiatives in the areas of children (parenting and education), lifestyle, and the workplace. Her 2016 follow-on book, Quiet Power: The Secret Strengths of Introverts, focused on introverted children and teens, the book also being directed to their educators and parents.

Her book Bittersweet: How Sorrow and Longing Make Us Whole (2022) focused on accepting feelings of sorrow and longing as inspiration to experience sublime emotions—such as beauty and wonder and transcendence—to counterbalance the "normative sunshine" of society's pressure to constantly be positive.

== Early life and education ==
Born in 1968, Cain is the youngest of three children, and was raised in Lawrence, Nassau County, New York. She graduated with an A.B. degree in English from Princeton University in 1989, after completing a 91-page-long senior thesis titled "A Study of Thomas Stearns Eliot and Wyndham Lewis." She earned a J.D. degree from Harvard Law School in 1993.

== Career ==
Cain worked for seven years as an attorney at Cleary Gottlieb Steen & Hamilton, and then as a negotiations consultant as owner and principal of The Negotiation Company. She has been a fellow and a faculty/staff member of the Woodhull Institute for Ethical Leadership, an educational non-profit organization.

She left her careers in corporate law and consulting for a quieter life of writing at home with her family, likening her years as a Wall Street lawyer to "time spent in a foreign country".

=== Background and motivation for Quiet ===
Cain explained that if she were not a writer she would want to be a research psychologist. Her interest in writing about introversion reportedly stemmed from her own difficulties with public speaking, which made Harvard Law School "a trial".

While still an attorney, Cain noticed that others at her firm were putting personality traits like hers to good use in the profession, and that gender per se did not explain those traits. She eventually realized that the concepts of introversion and extroversion provided the "language for talking about questions of identity" that had been lacking.

She explained that in writing Quiet she was fueled by the passion and indignation that she imagined fueled Betty Friedan's 1963 feminist book, The Feminine Mystique. Cain likened introverts today to women at that time—second-class citizens with gigantic amounts of untapped talent. Saying that most introverts are not aware of how they are constantly spending their time in ways that they would prefer not to be and have been doing so all their lives, Cain explained that she was trying to give people entitlement in their own minds to be who they are.

She said she was interested in working with parents and teachers of introverted children and to re-shape workplace culture and design, and in particular replace what she terms "The New Groupthink" with an environment more conducive to deep thought and solo reflection.

=== Quiet, Quiet Power, and Quiet Journal ===
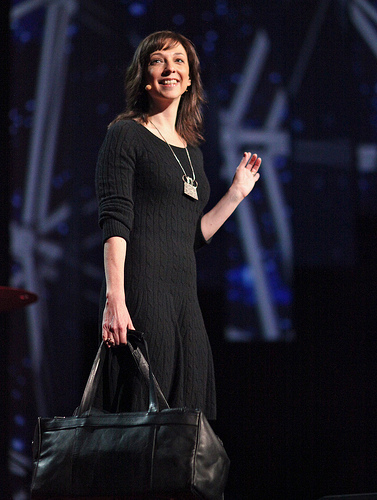
Cain speaking at TED2012 ("not my natural milieu") with a prop suitcase, said to be a metaphor for the treasures, memories, activities and thoughts that make you you. Cain's suitcase contained books.

Cain, a self-described introvert, had grappled with her own introversion as a Wall Street attorney before writing Quiet: The Power of Introverts in a World That Can't Stop Talking. In contrast, she described the time of creating Quiet—seven years of reading, researching, and thinking—as "total bliss". Initially concerned that the book would be merely a "highly idiosyncratic project", she found instead that New York book publishers engaged in a bidding war. Quiet was published January 24, 2012.

Cain wrote that her year of preparation before her February 2012 TED talk had unfolded in "three stages of accelerating dread", so she joined Toastmasters and scheduled a two-hour crash course with TED's speaking coach. But saying her butterflies had turned into "gut-wrenching knots", she worked for six full days with an acting coach immediately before the talk. Three months after the talk, Cain confirmed her April 2011 prediction that the ensuing year would be her Year of Speaking Dangerously, writing that she had metamorphosed into what she termed an "impossibly oxymoronic creature: the Public Introvert". The Atlantic's Megan Garber remarked that the ideas spread by TED are becoming defined by the persona of the speaker who presents them, citing Cain in particular as representing the idea of the power of introversion in an extrovert-optimized world. Chris Weller quipped in Business Insider that Cain had become "the patron saint of introverts".

Within one week of its publication, Forbes' Jenna Goudreau noted that Quiet was featured by several major media outlets and was shared extensively across the Web, Goudreau observing that readers said they felt validated and seen for the first time. Cain spoke at leadership, management, training and education conferences throughout the U.S. and internationally. By 2015, she had delivered more than 100 speeches, sometimes receiving five figures per appearance, in addition to her pro bono work. InformationWeek's Debra Donston-Miller had noted that the idea of introversion and extroversion was being widely discussed due in large part to media coverage of Quiet.

There's zero correlation between being the best talker and having the best ideas—I mean zero.

— Susan Cain, First TED talk, 2012.

Within a year of her first TED talk, Cain had formed an online public speaking and communication class for introverts, said to emphasize authenticity over showmanship.

She collaborates with Steelcase to design office spaces to include quiet areas where workers can have privacy for a time, in contrast to open plan offices.

In 2016, Cain co-authored Quiet Power: The Secret Strengths of Introverts, which focused on introverted children and teens, the book also directed to their educators and parents.

In 2018, she began co-curating the Next Big Idea Club with Malcolm Gladwell, Adam Grant, and Daniel H. Pink, focusing on books about psychology, business, happiness, and productivity.

On March 31, 2020, Cain published Quiet Journal: Discover Your Secret Strengths and Unleash Your Inner Power, a journal with a first section directed to self-assessment, and a second section for applying that self-knowledge and prompting action.

=== The Quiet Revolution ===
Cain's second TED talk (2014) formally announced the Quiet Revolution—a "venture backed, mission-based" organization for transforming office architecture to combat the erosion of focus and privacy in modern offices, forming a Quiet Leadership Institute to help organizations train introverted leaders, and empowering quiet children. The organization focuses on areas including children, life, and the workplace, while providing training programs and learning tools for client organizations to use in managing employees. More specifically, the organization formed an online education course for parents, a co-branded lifestyle section in HuffPost, a podcast, a website to support a community including writers and advocates, and young-adult books and shows whose heroines are quiet leaders. Quiet Revolution implemented a Quiet Ambassador initiative, for which it trained volunteers to be embedded in schools, businesses and other participating organizations.

=== Bittersweet ===
I've concluded that bittersweetness is not, as we tend to think, just a momentary feeling or event. It's also a quiet force, a way of being, a storied tradition—as dramatically overlooked as it is brimming with human potential. It's an authentic and elevating response to the problem of being alive in a deeply flawed yet stubbornly beautiful world.

— Bittersweet at pp. xxii-xxiv

Cain's third TED talk (2019), "The hidden power of sad songs and rainy days", preceded her April 5, 2022 book, Bittersweet: How Sorrow and Longing Make Us Whole. The book's theme is to accept feelings of sorrow and longing as inspiration to experience sublime emotions—such as beauty and wonder and transcendence—to counterbalance the "normative sunshine" of society's pressure to constantly be positive.

=== Lucky & Norman ===
Collaborating with five family members, Cain co-authored the animated children's book Lucky & Norman: Saying Goodbye Is Bittersweet. The book recounts how two brothers form a friendship with two donkeys during a farm vacation. Published on June 2, 2026, the book is inspired by the theme of Cain's 2019 Bittersweet.

== Awards and achievements ==
- 2012, February: Quiet reached No. 4 on The New York Times Best Seller list (hardcover non-fiction category).
- 2012: Cain's first TED talk video received its first million views faster than any other TED video, and within nine months had entered the 98th percentile (20th of 1380 videos) of most viewed TED videos of all time.
- 2012, July: Nathan Heller's Culture Desk piece in The New Yorker listed Cain's talk among five key TED Talks exemplifying the appeal of that lecture series, citing her presentation of a counterintuitive data-based argument as a miniature theatre piece.
- 2012, November: Cain was featured in the PBS-AOL Makers video initiative for recognizing trailblazing women.
- 2012, December: Quiet was named in numerous "Best of 2012" book lists.
- 2012, December: Cain was named one of five top Princeton alumni newsmakers for 2012.
- 2013, February: Harvard Business Review's Mitch Joel listed Cain's TED Talk among "10 TED Talks to Help You Reimagine Your Business".
- 2013, April: Toastmasters International named Cain recipient of its 2013 "Golden Gavel Award", given annually to an individual distinguished in the fields of communication and leadership.
- 2013, September: Cain received Harvard Law School's "Celebration 60" Award.
- 2014, March: Cain was one of the "TED All-Stars", with Cain presenting for a second time at TED's thirtieth anniversary conference.
- 2014, May: Cain was listed in Inc. magazine as being among the 50 most influential leadership and management experts.
- 2015, Quiet had sold more than two million copies worldwide
- 2016, May: Quiet Power started at #4 on The New York Times Best Seller list (children's middle grade hardcover category).
- 2018, November: Cain was included in LinkedIn's 20 "Top Voices" of 2018, a list of "influencers driving global business conversation".
- 2022, April: The New York Times listed Bittersweet as #1 bestseller in both "Hardcover Nonfiction" and "Combined Print & E-Book Nonfiction" categories.
- 2023, February: Oprah Winfrey selected Bittersweet as her 99th Oprah's Book Club pick.
- 2024, January: "A Quiet Life in 7 Steps" was #5, then #3, audiobook on Amazon Audible.

== Selected work ==
- "Quiet: The Power of Introverts / How to thrive in a world that can't stop talking", Psychology Today (list having links to blog series).
- "The Rise of the New Groupthink" (archive), Opinion section of The New York Times, January 13, 2012; appearing in print January 15, 2012.
- "Don't Call Introverted Children 'Shy' " (archive), Time Psychology section, January 26, 2012.
- "Secrets of a Super Successful Introvert: How to (Quietly) Get Your Way" (archive), O: The Oprah Magazine, February 2012.
- "Introverts run the world – quietly" (archive), CNN.com, March 18, 2012.
- Essay: "An Introvert Steps Out" (archive), "Sunday Book Review" section of The New York Times, published online April 27, 2012. Version appeared in print on page BR27 of the "Sunday Book Review" on April 29, 2012.
