= Biological basis of personality =

Biological causes of variation in human personality

The biological basis of personality is a collection of brain systems and mechanisms that underlie human personality. Human neurobiology, especially as it relates to complex traits and behaviors, is not well understood, but research into the neuroanatomical and functional underpinnings of personality are an active field of research. Animal models of behavior, molecular biology, and brain imaging techniques have provided some insight into human personality, especially trait theories.

Much of the current understanding of personality from a neurobiological perspective places an emphasis on the biochemistry of the behavioral systems of reward, motivation, and punishment. In the context of the biological body, neuroscience evidence suggests that the brain is modular, meaning that the mental state is biologically structured and that personality is composed of distinct components. This has led to a few biologically based personality theories such as Eysenck's three factor model of personality, Grey's reinforcement sensitivity theory (RST), and Cloninger's model of personality. The Big Five model of personality is not biologically based; yet some research in the differences in brain structures provided biological support also for this model.

== Defining personality in a biological context ==
Personality can be defined as a set of characteristics or traits that drive individual differences in human behavior. From a biological perspective, these traits can be traced back to brain structures and neural mechanisms. However, this definition and theory of biological basis is not universally accepted. There are many conflicting theories of personality in the fields of psychology, psychiatry, philosophy, and neuroscience. A few examples of this are the nature vs. nurture debate and how the idea of a 'soul' fits into biological theories of personality.

== History of biology-based personality research ==
Since the time of the ancient Greeks, humankind has attempted to explain personality through spiritual beliefs, philosophy, and psychology. Historically, studies of personality have traditionally come from the social sciences and humanities, but in the past two decades neuroscience has begun to be more influential in the understanding of human personality.

However, the most cited and influential figures in publishing the first biology-based personality theories are Hans Eysenck and Jeffrey Alan Gray. Eysenck used both behavioral and psychophysiological methodologies to test and develop his theories. He published a book in 1947 called Dimensions of Personality, describing the personality dimensions of extraversion and neuroticism. Gray, a student of Eysenck, studied personality traits as individual differences in sensitivity to rewarding and punishing stimuli. The significance of Gray's work and theories was his use of biology to define behavior, which stimulated a lot of subsequent research.

In 1951, Hans Eysenck and Donald Prell published an experiment in which identical (monozygotic) and fraternal (dizygotic) twins, ages 11 and 12, were tested for neuroticism. It is described in detail in an article published in the Journal of Mental Science in which Eysenck and Prell concluded that "The factor of neuroticism is not a statistical artifact, but constitutes a biological unit which is inherited as a whole ... neurotic predisposition is to a large extent hereditarily determined." The study concluded that the neuroticism trait was a result of up to eighty percent of genetics. There was a stronger correlation among identical twins rather than fraternal twins.

The idea of biology-based personality research is relatively new, but growing in interest and number of publications. In August 2004, there was a conference specifically on the topic, called The Biological Basis of Personality and Individual Differences. This allowed for presenting and sharing of ideas between psychologists, psychiatrists, molecular geneticists, and neuroscientists, and eventually gave birth to the book under the same title. The book is a collection of current research (as of 2006) in the field contributed by many authors and edited by Turhan Canli. Recently, psychology professor Colin G. DeYoung has even named the idea as the field of "Personality Neuroscience." Furthermore, a journal devoted to cultivating research investigating the neurobiological basis of personality has recently been established and is called "Personality Neuroscience."

== Personality theories with biological basis ==
There are many theories of personality that centre on the identification of a set of traits that encompass human personality. Few however, are biologically based. This section will describe some theories of personality that have a biological basis.

=== Eysenck's three-factor model of personality ===
Eysenck's three-factor model of personality was a causal theory of personality based on activation of reticular formation and limbic system. The reticular formation is a region in the brainstem that is involved in mediating arousal and consciousness. The limbic system is involved in mediating emotion, behavior, motivation, and long-term memory.

1. Extraversion (E) – degree to which people are outgoing and are interactive with people, which is mediated by the activation of the reticular formation.
2. Neuroticism (N) – degree of emotional instability, which is associated with the limbic system.
3. Psychoticism (P) – degree of aggression and interpersonal hostility.

=== Gray's reinforcement sensitivity theory ===
Gray's reinforcement sensitivity theory (RST) is based on the idea that there are three brain systems that all differently respond to rewarding and punishing stimuli.

1. Fight-flight-freeze system (FFFS) – mediates the emotion of fear (not anxiety) and active avoidance of dangerous situations. The personality traits associated with this system is fear-proneness and avoidance.
2. Behavioral inhibition system (BIS) – mediates the emotion of anxiety and cautious risk-assessment behavior when entering dangerous situations due to conflicting goals. The personality traits associated with this system is worry-proneness and anxiety.
3. Behavioral approach system (BAS) – mediates the emotion of 'anticipatory pleasure,' resulting from reactions to desirable stimuli. The personality traits associated with this system are optimism, reward-orientation, and impulsivity.

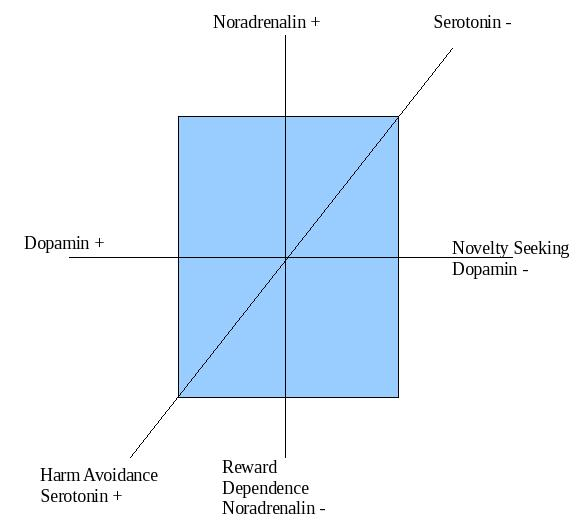
Cloninger's biological dimensions of personality

=== Cloninger model of personality ===
This model of personality is based on the idea that different responses to punishing, rewarding, and novel stimuli the main characteristics of the human mind is caused by an interaction of the three dimensions below:

1. Novelty Seeking (NS) – degree to which people are impulsive, correlated with low dopamine activity.
2. Harm Avoidance (HA) – degree to which people are anxious, correlated with high serotonin activity.
3. Reward Dependence (RD) – degree to which people are approval seeking, correlated with low norepinephrine activity.

=== Five factor model of personality ===
The five factor model (also known as the Big Five) is a widely used personality assessment that describes five core traits that a person possesses:

1. Openness – degree to which people enjoy experiencing new stimuli
2. Conscientiousness – degree to which people are dutiful and goal-oriented
3. Extraversion – degree to which people seek stimuli outside of themselves
4. Agreeableness – degree to which people aim to cooperate and please others
5. Neuroticism – degree to which people are emotionally unstable

There is large body of research relating the Big Five traits to individual differences in the brain's structure and function, as measured by MRI-based techniques. A selection of these findings are outlined in the "Brain imaging basis of personality" section below.

=== Two factor model of personality ===
A higher-order factor structure can be derived from the Big Five traits, as these traits have often been found to be correlated. Agreeableness, Conscientiousness, and Neuroticism (reversed) can be distilled into a single factor α, or the Stability factor. On the other hand, Extraversion and Openness can be distilled into a single factor β, or the Plasticity factor. These two meta-traits have been shown to be significantly heritable using behavior genetic analysis, which suggests a neurobiological basis that is unique and specific to these meta-traits. Indeed, a growing body of evidence demonstrates that serotonin is associated with Stability and dopamine is associated with Plasticity.

== Experimental techniques ==
There are many experimental techniques for measuring the biology of the brain, but there are five main methods used to investigate the biological basis of personality. The biological data from these methods are commonly correlated with personality traits. These personality traits are often determined by personality questionnaires. However, personality questionnaires may be biased because they are self-reported. As a result, scientists emphasize using several different measures of personality, rather than solely self-reported measures of personality. For example, another measure of personality traits is observation of behavior. Both humans and animals have been observed to measure personality traits, but animals are particularly useful for studying the long-term behavioral-biological relationship of personality.

Another interesting method that has become more sophisticated and affordable to researchers is the method of whole genome expression analysis. This method involves collecting data for a large number of genes simultaneously which provides many advantages in studying personality. In an article written by Alison M. Bell and Nadia Aubin-Horth, they describe the advantages very clearly by stating, "For one, it is probable that the genetic basis of personality is polygenic, so it makes sense to simultaneously study many genes. In addition, gene products rarely act alone. Instead, they perform their function by interacting together in pathways and networks. As a result, the molecular changes that characterize a phenotype are frequently not based on a single marker or gene, but rather on an entire pathway. Whole genome expression profiling therefore has the potential to reveal new candidates genes and pathways."

Method	Function	Significance
Electroencephalography (EEG)	This method measures electrical activity on the surface of the brain through the scalp, and has the high temporal resolution.	Before the advent of brain imaging technology, the only method to measure brain activity was electroencephalography (EEG).
Brain Imaging	Brain imaging can refer to either structural or functional imaging. Structural imaging allows for analysis using structural characteristics of the brain, whereas functional imaging involves measuring brain activity. Structural imaging of the brain can be accomplished by using Magnetic Resonance Imaging (MRI). Examples of functional imaging methods include Positron Emission Tomography (PET) and functional MRI (fMRI). PET scans measure the metabolism associated with brain activity, and fMRI measures the flow of blood in the brain, which reflects local brain activity. MRI has particularly high spatial resolution and is entirely non-invasive, whereas PET scans require the injection of radioactive tracers.	Brain imaging has catalyzed research of the neurobiological correlates of personality.
Molecular genetics	This method is used to analyze a gene-trait link, by measuring the structure and function of genes in the brain.	The use of molecular genetics in biology-based personality research is expected to grow.
Molecular assays	This method is used to analyze the amount of psychoactive substances, such as hormones and neurotransmitters.	Together, these two methods can specifically quantify, define, and manipulate the effects of brain molecules on behavior and personality traits. This has great clinical significance for treatment of personality disorders.
Pharmacological Manipulation	This method is used to alter the levels of biochemicals, and observe the effects on behavior.	Together, these two methods can specifically quantify, define, and manipulate the effects of brain molecules on behavior and personality traits. This has great clinical significance for treatment of personality disorders.

== Genetic and molecular correlations to personality ==
=== Neurotransmitters ===
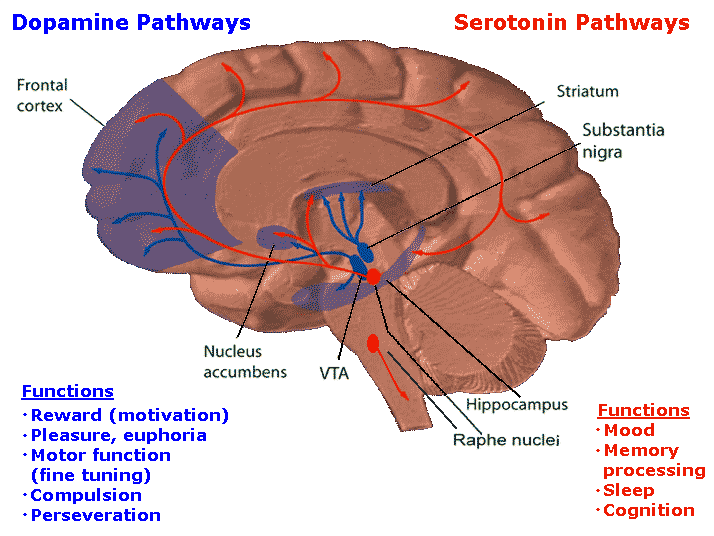
Dopamine and Serotonin pathways

The biology-based personality theories (discussed below) are based on correlating personality traits with behavioral systems related to motivation, reward, and punishment. On a broad level, this involves the autonomic nervous system, fear-processing circuits in the amygdala, the reward pathway from the ventral tegmental area (VTA) to the nucleus accumbens and prefrontal cortex. All of these circuits heavily rely on neurotransmitters and their precursors, but there has been the most research support for dopamine and serotonin pathways:

- Dopamine: Dopamine is a monoamine neurotransmitter that has been found to promote exploratory behavior. Dopaminergic pathways have been specifically correlated with the extraversion trait of the Five Factor Model of Personality. The monoamine oxidase (MAO) enzyme has a preferential affinity for dopamine, and its levels are inversely correlated with sensation seeking.
- Serotonin: Serotonin is a monoamine neurotransmitter, and has been found to promote avoidance behavior through inhibitory pathways. Specifically, serotonin has been associated with Neuroticism, Agreeableness, and Conscientiousness (traits defined by the Five Factor Model of Personality).

=== Genes ===
Previous studies show that genes account for at most 50 percent of a given trait. However, it is widely accepted that variance in gene sequence affect behavior, and genes are a significant risk factor for personality disorders. With the growing interest in using molecular genetics in tracing the biological basis of personality, there may be more gene-trait links found in the future.

Varying polymorphisms and sequence repeats in the gene for dopamine receptor D4 and serotonin transporter gene 5-HTTLPR, have both been found to influence the extraversion trait in adults. Specifically, study participants with at least one copy of the 7-repeat variant of the dopamine receptor D4 gene had higher scores of self-reported extraversion. This suggests that dopamine and serotonin interact to regulate the conflicting behavioral traits of careless exploration vs. cautious inhibition.

=== Synaptic plasticity ===
Synaptic plasticity refers to the ability of neurons to strengthen or weaken the connections between them. According to Hebbian theory, these connections are strengthened and maintained through repeated stimulation between neurons. Specifically, there is an emphasis on long-term potentiation (LTP), which is the prolonged strengthening of synaptic connections that facilitate learning from experience.

On a larger scale, there are many pathways and brain regions that are interdependent and contribute to a cohesive, stable personality. For example, the amygdala and hippocampus of the limbic system mediate emotional intensity and consolidate memory of these experiences. But the basic mechanism by which these pathways and brain regions perform these functions, is synaptic plasticity. Ultimately, it boils down to this feature of neurons that allows the brain to learn from repeated experiences, retain memories, and ultimately maintain personality. Joseph LeDoux, an award-winning neuroscientist, asserts that although humans share the same brain systems, it is the unique wiring of neurons that is different in each person and makes their personality.

== Brain imaging basis of personality ==
Over the past two decades, structural magnetic resonance imaging (sMRI) and functional magnetic resonance imaging (fMRI) techniques have been used to study associations between neural activations in the brain and personality traits and other cognitive, social, and emotional processes that characterize personality. Using MRI-based methods for such studies has become increasingly popular due to the non-invasive nature of MRI and the high resolution of MRI.

=== Structural magnetic resonance imaging ===
The use of structural magnetic resonance imaging (sMRI) to understand the neurobiological basis of personality and sociocognitive functioning involves assessing the relationship between individual differences in these factors and individual differences in measures of brain structure, such as gray matter volume, cortical thickness, or structural integrity of white matter tracts.

Studies have shown that brain volume is meaningfully correlated with four of the Big Five personality measures. Extraversion was associated with increased volume of medial orbitofrontal cortex, a region associated with processing reward-related stimuli. Conscientiousness was associated with increased volume in the lateral prefrontal cortex, a region involved in planning and the voluntary control of behavior. Agreeableness was associated with increased volume in regions involved in mentalizing, which is the ability to infer the intentions and mental states of other individuals. Neuroticism was associated with increased volume of brain regions associated with threat, punishment, and negative emotions. Openness/Intellect was not significantly correlated with the volume of any brain structures. In another study, neuroticism was negatively correlated with the gray matter volume of the right amygdala, whereas extraversion was positively correlated with gray matter volume of the left amygdala. A separate study also reported a significant association between neuroticism scores and gray matter volume of the left amygdala. In one MRI study, Novelty Seeking correlated with increased grey matter volume in regions of the cingulate cortex, Harm Avoidance correlated with decreased grey matter volume in the orbitofrontal, occipital, and parietal cortex. Reward Dependence correlated with decreased grey matter volume in the caudate nucleus.

A separate but similar line of research has used diffusion tensor imaging to measure the structural integrity of white matter in the brain. One study has shown that neuroticism is negatively correlated with the structural integrity of white matter tracts that connect various brain regions, such as the prefrontal cortex, parietal cortex, amygdala, and other regions in the subcortex. On the other hand, Openness and Agreeableness are positively associated with the structural integrity of these white matter tracts. Openness was also positively associated with the structural integrity of white matter interconnecting dorsolateral prefrontal cortex in both hemispheres.

=== Functional magnetic resonance imaging ===
Functional magnetic resonance imaging (fMRI) involves the indirect measurement of neural activity by measuring disturbances in local magnetic fields in the brain. These local disturbances are linked to differential amounts of blood flow to the brain, which is linked to neural activity. Early work using fMRI has studied whether individual differences in personality traits and sociocognitive functioning are associated with individual differences in neural activations in certain brain regions during certain tasks. Such studies have demonstrated associations between single brain regions' neural responses to certain tasks and individual differences in a wide range of sociocognitive functioning, such as approach/avoidance behavior, sensitivity to rejection, conceptions of the self, and susceptibility to persuasive messages. A small collection of fMRI studies have also demonstrated a significant relationship between brain responses to certain tasks and personality survey measures, such as extraversion and neuroticism.

Over time, neuroscience researchers have recognized that brain regions do not operate in isolation. In fact, the synchronization of firing rates of neurons across different brain regions helps mediate the integration and processing of information across the brain. Thus, studies relating neural activation in single regions to personality measures and associated sociocognitive functioning ignore information about how personality and sociocognitive functioning relate to neural activations across multiple regions in the brain. For example, it is unlikely that neural activation in a single brain region is unilaterally associated with individual differences in personality measures, such as the tendency to down-regulate negative emotions. However, the functional connectivity, or the synchronization of neural activity, between two brain regions can be related to individual differences in personality and sociocognitive functioning. For example, one study found that in an emotion regulation task, coupling of neural responses in the amygdala and the prefrontal cortex was significantly associated with more successful regulation of negative emotions. Other studies shown that neuroticism is associated with relatively low functional connectivity between amygdala and anterior cingulate cortex during a variety of tasks, such as viewing negative emotional stimuli and during a classical conditioning reward task.

==== Resting-state functional connectivity ====
Functional connectivity can also be measured at rest, during which individuals are not explicitly engaged in any task. These resting-state functional connectivities can also be related to personality measures and other sociocognitive functioning. For instance, one study found that functional connectivity patterns originating from the amygdala are predictive of neuroticism and extraversion scores. However, personality measures and sociocognitive functioning are not subserved solely by the functional connectivity between two given brain regions. Indeed, examining functional connectivity across the brain may shed more light on the neurobiological basis of personality and sociocognitive functioning. For example, a recent line of research has demonstrated that individual differences in functional connectomes, which are characterized by patterns of spontaneous synchronization of neural activations across the entire brain, are predictive of individual differences in personality and sociocognitive functioning, such as openness to experience, fluid intelligence, and trait levels of paranoia. The use of functional connectomes to predict individual differences is known as "functional connectome fingerprinting" and allows researcher to construct models of personality and sociocognitive functioning based on neural activity across the whole brain rather than within single regions (if using neural activations) or single pairs of regions (if using functional connectivity).

==== Graph theory-based analysis ====
Functional connectomes can be distilled into constituent intrinsic brain networks that are present during sleep, at rest, and during tasks. These brain networks can also reliably be mapped onto cognitive systems. The default mode network, for example, is composed of regions such as the medial prefrontal cortex, angular gyrus, temporoparietal junction, and the hippocampus, to name a few. One study has shown that Extraversion and Agreeableness are positively correlated with overall neural activity in the default mode network. Assessing the relationship between neural activity in brain networks and personality traits is an important first step for identifying where the neurobiological basis of personality traits may be localized. However, this approach does not offer a complete mechanistic explanation of how and why individual differences in these brain networks are related to individual differences in personality. To address this gap, neuroscience researchers have begun to leverage graph theoretical approaches to better understand characteristics of these brain networks, such as their assortativity, efficiency, and modularity. For example, one study has demonstrated that individual differences in anxiety-related harm avoidance behavior was associated with relatively low efficiency (i.e., high path length) in the insular-opercular brain network at rest. This finding suggests that trait anxiety may be associated with relatively slow and inefficient transfer of information within the insular-opercular brain network. Another study used a graph theoretical approach to demonstrate that high trait impulsivity was associated with relatively high modularity of resting-state brain networks, such that brain networks exhibited relatively high within-system density of functional connectivity but relatively low between-system density of functional connectivity. A separate study has also demonstrated that high Conscientiousness is associated with high local clustering and high betweenness centrality within the default mode network and the fronto-parietal network (FPN). Given the role of the FPN in cognitive control, these findings suggest that people high on Conscientiousness may exhibit higher cognitive control. Furthermore, heightened interconnectivity within the DMN also provides convergent evidence that highly conscientious individuals may be adept at high-level cognitive tasks, such as complex planning, given that the DMN is strongly associated with high-level executive function and working memory.

== Replication crisis in neuroimaging ==
The biological basis of the Big Five traits has undergone significant re-evaluation due to the replication crisis in neuroimaging. In a comprehensive systematic review and meta-analysis titled "Nothing to see here," Chen and Canli (2022) analyzed decades of structural MRI research, examining 128 independent structural neuroimaging studies. They concluded that there are no reproducible associations between the Five-Factor Model traits and measures of brain structure, such as grey matter volume or cortical thickness, suggesting that previous positive findings were likely artifacts of small sample sizes and publication bias. This paradigm shift was further supported by Marek et al. (2022) in Nature, who demonstrated that brain-wide association studies (BWAS) require thousands of participants to yield reproducible results. Most historical personality neuroscience studies, which typically relied on small cohorts (N < 100), were underpowered and prone to inflated effect sizes. Following this shift toward skepticism of universal structural markers, Wu and Chang (2025) argued that personality neuroscience should move "from big associations to big practices." They proposed that normative modeling should become the default approach, shifting the focus from group-level correlations to mapping individual brain-behavior deviations against large-scale population norms. While structural correlates remain elusive, functional imaging has shown more promise. A 2023 meta-analysis of resting-state fMRI by Lin et al. identified stable correlates for neuroticism, linking the trait to activity in the left middle temporal gyrus, hippocampus, and striatum, suggesting that personality may be better reflected in dynamic brain function rather than static anatomy.

== See also ==
- Hypostatic model of personality
- Neural basis of self
- Personality Psychology
