= Reinforcement sensitivity theory =

Theory about 3 brain-behavioral systems that underlie individual sensitivities

Reinforcement sensitivity theory (RST) proposes three brain-behavioral systems that underlie individual differences in sensitivity to reward, punishment, and motivation. While not originally defined as a theory of personality, the RST has been used to study and predict anxiety, impulsivity, and extraversion. The theory evolved from Gray's biopsychological theory of personality to incorporate findings from a number of areas in psychology and neuroscience, culminating in a major revision in 2000. The revised theory distinguishes between fear and anxiety and proposes functionally related subsystems. Measures of RST have not been widely adapted to reflect the revised theory due to disagreement over related versus independent subsystems. Despite this controversy, RST informed the study of anxiety disorders in clinical settings and continues to be used today to study and predict work performance. RST, built upon Gray's behavioral inhibition system (BIS) and behavioral activation system (BAS) understanding, also may help to suggest predispositions to and predict alcohol and drug abuse. RST, a continuously evolving paradigm, is the subject of multiple areas of contemporary psychological enquiry.

== Origins and evolution of the theory ==
Gray's biopsychological theory of personality was informed by his earlier studies with Mowrer on reward, punishment, and motivation and Hans Eysenck's study of the biology of personality traits. Eysenck linked Extraversion to activation of the ascending reticular activating system, an area of the brain which regulates sleep and arousal transitions.

Eysenck's two original personality factors, Neuroticism and Extraversion, were derived from the same lexical paradigm used by other researchers (e.g., Gordon Allport, Raymond Cattell) to delineate the structure of personality. Eysenck's Extraversion-Arousal Hypothesis states that under low stimulation conditions, introverts (defined as low in Extraversion) will be more highly aroused than extraverts; however, under high stimulation, introverts may become over-aroused, which will feedback within the ascending reticular activating system and result in decreases in arousal. In contrast, extraverts tend to show greater increases in arousal under high stimulation. Eysenck also studied the relationship between neuroticism and activation of the limbic system using classical emotional conditioning models. His theory focused more on anxiety as a disorder than a personality trait. Eysenck's theory predicts that introverts are more likely to develop anxiety disorders because they show higher neuroticism and stronger emotional conditioning responses under high arousal. His theory was criticized because introverts often show the opposite pattern, weaker classical conditioning under high arousal, and some supporting data confounded personality traits with time of day.

=== Gray's biopsychological theory: behavioral activation and inhibition systems ===
Unlike Eysenck, Gray believed that personality traits and disorders could not be explained by classical conditioning alone. Gray proposed the Biopsychological Theory of personality in 1970 based on extensive animal research. His theory emphasized the relationship between personality and sensitivity to reinforcement (i.e. reward and punishment). Eysenck's theory emphasized Extraversion, Neuroticism, and arousal, while Gray's theory emphasized Impulsivity, Anxiety, approach motivation, and avoidance motivation.

In his original theory, Gray proposed two new dimensions to Eysenck's theory - anxiety and impulsivity. Gray's anxiety, or BIS, correlates with Eysenck's neuroticism. Gray's impulsivity, or BAS, correlates with Eysenck's extraversion. Even though Gray's original theory was modified later by Gray himself, the original theory still made some contributions to the study of biological systems and their role in personality. The largest of these contributions was that the biological central nervous system can be linked to a psychological reward system, composed of approach and inhibition systems.

Gray's model of personality was based on three hypothesized brain systems:

Behavioral activation system (BAS)

- The BAS includes brain regions involved in regulating arousal: cerebral cortex, thalamus, and striatum. The system is responsive to conditioned and unconditioned reward cues. BAS regulates approach behaviors and is referred to as the reward system. It has also been called the "go" system because it motivates actions that lead to rewards. In general, individuals with a more active BAS tend to be more impulsive and may have difficulty inhibiting their behavior when approaching a goal. Furthermore, BAS is related to stimuli associated with the presence of reward and/or the cease of punishment, also understood as positive reinforcement.

Behavioral inhibition system (BIS)

- The BIS also includes brain regions involved in regulating arousal: the brain stem, and neocortical projections to the frontal lobe. BIS is responsive to punishment, novelty, uncertainty, and non-rewarding stimuli. BIS regulates avoidance behaviors and is often referred to as the punishment system. It has also been called the "stop" because it encourages inhibition of behaviors. Individuals with more active BIS may be vulnerable to negative emotions, including frustration, anxiety, fear, and sadness. Furthermore, BIS is related to stimuli associated with the presence of punishment and/or the cease of reward, also understood as negative reinforcement.

Fight/flight system (FFS)

- The FFS encourages extreme reactions in response to threats. These include reactions of rage, panic, and fight or flight, and is sensitive to unconditioned aversive stimuli. FFS is often referred to as the threat system. A common misunderstanding can be that FFS is a measure of one's reaction to lean more towards fighting or to lean more towards fleeing in response to perceived threats; however, FFS is a measure of one's intensity to respond with either fight or flight behavior, as opposed to reacting not so acutely to perceived threats. Individuals with more sensitive FFS are quicker to fight or flee in dangerous situations.

According to Gray, personality traits are associated with individual differences in the strengths of BAS (approach motivation) and BIS (avoidance motivation) systems. As it is defined for the remainder of the article, higher BAS/BIS refers to greater activation of that system.

=== Measures ===
High BAS is generally associated with high extraversion, low neuroticism, and trait impulsivity, while high BIS is associated with low extraversion, high neuroticism, and trait anxiety. In addition to predicting trait standings, high BAS is associated with higher positive affect in response to reward, while high BIS is associated with higher negative affect in response to punishment. Studies in Gray's laboratory supported his prediction that extraverts, higher in BAS and lower in BIS than introverts, are more sensitive to rewards, experience higher levels of positive affect, and learn faster under rewarding conditions.

The most widely used measures of the approach (BAS) and avoidance (BIS) systems are the BIS/BAS scales developed by Carver and White in 1994. The Generalized Reward and Punishment Expectancies Scales (GRAPES) were also used to operationalize BIS and BAS. Both self-report measures (listed above) and behavioral measures (such as affective modulation of the eyeblink startle response) have been used to test predictions and provide mixed support for Gray's theory.

=== Critique ===
These measures were constructed under the assumption that BIS, BAS and associated traits Anxiety and Impulsivity are independent. In contrast, Gray first described BIS and BAS as opposing systems with bidirectional inhibitory links in animal models. Thus, empirical results that claimed to falsify the theory may have relied on faulty predictions for independent, non-interacting systems. Gray's theory was also criticized because the boundary between FFS (threat response system) and BIS (punishment system) was difficult to define empirically, akin to differentiating between fear and anxiety. Matthews and Gilliland proposed separate cognitive systems underlying fear and anxiety and emphasized the need to study these systems outside of animal models. These critiques led to a major revision and renaming of the theory in 2000. The Reinforcement Sensitivity Theory (RST) redefined the three systems underlying anxiety, impulsivity, motivation, and reinforcement learning.

== Reinforcement sensitivity theory ==
Reinforcement sensitivity theory is one of the major biological models of individual differences in emotion, motivation, and learning. The theory distinguishes between fear and anxiety, and links reinforcement processes to personality.

Behavioral activation system (BAS)

- Proposed to facilitate reactions to all appetitive/rewarding stimuli and regulates approach behavior.

Behavioral inhibition system (BIS)

- Proposed to mediate conflict both within and between FFFS and BAS: FFFS (avoidance) and BAS (approach) (or BAS-BAS, FFFS-FFFS). These conflicts underlie anxiety.

Fight-flight-freeze system (FFFS)

- Proposed to mediate reactions to all aversive/ punishing stimuli (conditioned and unconditioned), regulates avoidance behavior, and underlies fear.

=== Improved measures ===
The fight-flight-freeze system (FFFS) was expanded to include all aversive/punishment stimuli, conditioned and unconditioned. Similarly, the Behavioral Activation System (BAS) was expanded to include all appetitive/reward stimuli. The Behavioral Inhibition System (BIS) was defined as a conflict system activated whenever both BAS and FFFS are activated together or multiple inputs compete within the systems, thereby producing anxiety. If the systems are assumed to be functionally related, the effect of a given stimulus is dependent upon the strength of that stimulus, reactivity in the activated system, and strength of the competing system. Thus, for a reward, the behavior output from BAS is dependent on the strength of the reward, activation of the BAS, and inhibition strength of BIS. For example, if a reward outweighs a threat, the BIS should excite the BAS and inhibit the FFFS, which will likely result in approach behavior.

The new RST distinguishes the subsystems underlying anxiety and fear. The FFFS is associated with fear and the BIS is associated with anxiety. This distinction is still debated, especially in clinical settings wherein BIS scores are sensitive to fear/panic-reducing, not anxiety-reducing treatments. Furthermore, the possibility of anxiety's triggering panic and vice versa supports a model of the BIS and the FFFS in which the two are not causally independent. Conflicting results regarding the relationship between fear and anxiety may reflect measures which were not updated to reflect the functionally dependent systems of the new RST. A review by Perkins and Corr (2006) found that the BIS as measured in Carver, 1994 scales and similar constructs tap into the FFFS (which fear responses) and not the true BIS (which underlies anxiety). These definitions were not updated to reflect the revised RST model. D.C. Blanchard and colleagues (2001) created vignettes with response options that modeled rodent reactions to anxiety (the BIS, used ambiguous/partially threatening stimuli) and fear (the FFFS, used pure threat situations) to study these constructs in humans. These behavioroid scales ask: "What would you do if (insert scenario inducing fear or anxiety)?" Response options accurately reflect the revised RST, but have not been widely tested or applied.

=== Separable and joint subsystems hypotheses ===
The revised RST reflects functional dependence of the systems; however, there are two competing hypotheses developed for testing RST predictions. The separable systems hypothesis (SSH) is defined by two independent systems, reward and punishment. Independence implies that reactivity to rewards should be approximately equal across all levels of punishment, and reactivity to punishment should be equal across all levels of reward. Thus, rewarding stimuli may activate the BAS, without exerting effects on the BIS or the FFFS. The SSH is proposed to operate in extreme circumstances, within individuals with highly reactive systems and/or experimental conditions that only present rewarding or punishing stimuli. The separable subsystems hypothesis has been applied successfully to study reinforcement learning and motivation in clinical populations. Alternatively, the joint subsystems hypothesis (JSH), in accordance with Gray's original animal models and the revised RST, states that reward and punishment exert combined effects in the BAS and the FFFS, while the BIS resolves conflict within and between the systems. The reward and punishment systems are defined as dependent, such that reward activation (the BAS) both increases responses to appetitive stimuli and decreases responses to aversive stimuli. The joint subsystems hypothesis is most applicable in real-world contexts that contain mixed stimuli: strong, weak, punishment, and reward.

In a recent review on RST measurement, authors distinguished between dependent system inputs and dependent behavioral outputs. The BAS, FFFS, and BIS are dependent systems, and current research attempts to define under what task situations and to what degree they interact. A rewarding stimulus may activate all three systems to some extent such that high scores on a BAS-related behavioral trait, for example, may include high BAS, low FFFS, and low BIS activations. Corr and colleagues tested separate and joint subsystems predictions against each other. Their results support the joint subsystems hypothesis: high anxiety individuals reacted more strongly to punishment cues, and this effect was stronger in jointly low impulsive, high anxiety individuals. Pickering used regression and neural network models to show that patterns of inputs from the BAS and the BIS/FFFS generate a large range of outcomes that support the JSH (all three system activations were needed to determine best fit for behavioral output). There is now pharmacological evidence to support dependence of these systems, notably serotonergic (5-HT) modulation of the dopamine pathway.

As mentioned previously, these complex, dependent systems are not reflected in questionnaires, such as Carver's BIS/BAS, that are oftentimes used to test RST predictions. A variety of disparate experimental findings, originally viewed as inconsistent with Gray's Biopsychological theory, are more consistent with RST joint systems hypothesis.

=== Renaming impulsivity ===
Smillie, Pickering, and Jackson (2006) advocated for renaming trait Impulsivity, which is associated with BAS in the revised RST, Extraversion. Empirical tests find that Extraversion is a better predictor than Impulsivity of reward learning. Some components of the BAS and reward learning are better explained by association with Extraversion, especially high positive affect, while the cortical arousal loop originally proposed to underlie BAS in Gray's theory is still tied most closely with Impulsivity. Regardless of the trait label, the authors point out that the RST did not develop as a theory to explain the personality constructs, Anxiety and Impulsivity. Rather, the RST predicts associations between reinforcement sensitivity, motivation, and behavior.

== Applications ==
=== Workplace performance ===
Carver and White's 1994 BIS/BAS scales were used to support the finding that employees high in BIS (avoidance motivation) show lower work performance and engagement, while employees high in BAS (approach motivation) show higher performance in rewarding situations only. These measures are not based on the revised RST, and may confound fear and anxiety. Alternatively, a scale created by Jackson and termed the Jackson 5 has recently been validated as a measure of the revised RST and shows convergent validity with measures of fear and anxiety. The proposed fear (FFFS) subscale is associated with avoidance behaviors (example item: 'If approached by a suspicious stranger, I run away') while the anxiety (BIS) subscale includes social situations wherein reward and punishment stimuli result in conflict between approach and avoidance motivations (example item: 'I prefer to work on projects where I can prove my abilities to others'). Clark and Loxton (2011) used the Jackson 5 to investigate mediators between fear, psychological acceptance, and work engagement. Self-reported fear, not anxiety, best predicted psychological acceptance, and lower work performance in turn. Thus, current research aims to apply measures based on the revised RST to more accurately clarify relations between fear, anxiety, and job performance.

=== Clinical research ===
The BIS and BAS sensitivities are associated with individual differences in positive and negative affect. This association has been largely explored in clinical populations exhibiting extreme scores on BIS/BAS measures. In their 2009 review, Bijttebier and colleagues summarized studies showing that high BIS sensitivity is present in individuals with anxiety, depression, and anorexia nervosa, whereas low BIS sensitivity is associated with psychopathy. Extremely high BAS sensitivity is characteristic of individuals with bipolar disorder, ADHD, and bulimia, while extremely low BAS often characterizes individuals with anhedonic depression. BIS and BAS may differentiate, as illustrated above, between sub-types of eating disorders and depression. These findings are correlational, and causal mechanisms were not directly tested. Researchers in fields ranging from cognitive science to self-regulation and attention are using the RST to investigate causal mechanisms that underlie the relationship between personality traits and psychopathology.

A study by Masuyama et al. suggests that treatment interventions, which increase trait resilience, may be helpful in decreasing depressive symptoms. High BIS was found to correlate directly with stronger depressive symptoms, while high BAS was found to correlate directly with low depressive symptoms. This confirmed results from previous studies. The study tested trait resilience as a mediator and found that trait resilience correlates negatively with depression. Therefore, high BAS leads to high trait resilience, which in turn leads to lower depressive symptoms. High BIS leads to decreased trait resilience, which in turn leads to increased depressive symptoms.

Some research shows that BIS and BAS levels may be useful in predicting onset of substance use disorders. Individuals with a stronger, more-sensitive BAS system correlated with early onset of substance use disorders.

Levels of BIS and BAS can be used to predict levels of substance use. Individuals with low BIS levels combined with high BAS levels showed activation patterns similar to activation patterns of heavy substance users in past studies. Individuals with high BIS levels and low BAS levels showed patterns of expectancy activation similar to those of light or non-users.

== See also ==
- Biological basis of personality
- Extraversion and introversion
- Personality psychology
- Reinforcement
- Trait theory
