= Neurotic Personality Questionnaire KON-2006 =

Psychometric tool

The Neurotic Personality Questionnaire KON-2006 is a psychometric tool used for diagnosing personality dysfunctions that contribute to the development of neurotic disorders. The use of the questionnaire may facilitate the diagnosis of neurotic disorder, as well as make it easier to differentiate between neurotic and pseudoneurotic syndromes, e.g. reaction to stress. Moreover, the questionnaire enables evaluation of changes occurring in the course of treatment.

The questionnaire has been created by Jerzy W. Aleksandrowicz, Katarzyna Klasa, Jerzy A. Sobański and Dorota Stolarska in the Department of Psychotherapy of the Jagiellonian University Medical College in Kraków, Poland.

== The content of the questionnaire ==
The questionnaire consists of 243 items that require positive or negative answer. They determine the values of 24 scales that describe areas related to the development of neurotic disorders, as well as the value of X-KON index that describes the global intensity of neurotic personality. Currently, only the Polish and Ukrainian versions of KON-2006 are available, however a number of studies based on the tool has been published in English.

== Scales ==
The following working (approximate) names were given to KON-2006 scales:

1. Feeling of being dependent on the environment
2. Asthenia
3. Negative self-esteem
4. Impulsiveness
5. Difficulties with decision making
6. Sense of alienation
7. Demobilization
8. Tendency to take risks
9. Difficulties in emotional relations
10. Lack of vitality
11. Conviction of own resourcelessness in life
12. Sense of lack of control
13. Deficit in internal locus of control
14. Imagination, indulging in fiction
15. Sense of guilt
16. Difficulties in interpersonal relations
17. Envy
18. Narcissistic attitude
19. Sense of being in danger
20. Exaltation
21. Irrationality
22. Meticulousness
23. Ponderings
24. Sense of being overloaded

== Methodology of the questionnaire creation ==
Search for and selection of items that were used for the creation of the KON-2006 questionnaire were based on empirical methods. Analysis of usefulness of 779 items was conducted (including items drawn from scales belonging to various personality and temperament inventories e.g. 16PF, MMPI, PTS, TTS, IPIP, TCI). Clarity, explicitness and comprehensiveness of each item was evaluated and appropriate improvements were implemented. Next, a comparison of answers was made between healthy individuals and the patients that were beginning treatment due to neurotic disorders. This allowed to select 243 items most useful in differentiation of the patients with neurotic disorders from the healthy individuals. These items were used for the creation of Neurotic Personality Questionnaire. The construction of 24 scales was based on cluster analysis conducted on the population of patients at the beginning of treatment and control groups.

== See also ==
- Neuroticism
- Personality
- Symptom Checklist "O"
