= Identity crisis (disambiguation) =

Identity crisis is an internal conflict of and search for identity.

Identity crisis may also refer to:

== Comics ==
- Identity Crisis (DC Comics), a 2004 limited series
- "Spider-Man: Identity Crisis", a 1998 Marvel Comics storyline

== Music ==
- Identity Crisis (Clea album), 2004
- Identity Crisis (Shelby Lynne album), 2003
- Identity Crisis (Sweet album), 1982
- Identity Crisis (Tedashii album), 2009
- Identity Crisis (Thrice album), 2000
- Identity Crisis, an album by WSTR, 2018

== Television and film ==
- Identity Crisis (film), a 1989 American comedy film by Melvin Van Peebles

=== Television episodes ===
- "Identity Crisis" (Bugs)
- "Identity Crisis" (Columbo)
- "Identity Crisis" (CSI)
- "Identity Crisis" (Danny Phantom)
- "Identity Crisis" (Garfield and Friends)
- "Identity Crisis" (Law & Order: Criminal Intent)
- "Identity Crisis" (NCIS)
- "Identity Crisis" (Numbers)
- "Identity Crisis" (The Outer Limits)
- "Identity Crisis" (Person of Interest)
- "Identity Crisis" (ReBoot)
- "Identity Crisis" (Star Trek: The Next Generation)
- "Identity Crisis" (Star Wars: The Bad Batch)
- "Identity Crisis" (Suits)
- "Identity Crisis" (Superman: The Animated Series)
- "Identity Crisis" (Undergrads)

== See also ==
- Identity disorder
- Identity disturbance
- Personality crisis (disambiguation)
