= Jeffrey Alan Gray =

British psychologist (1934–2004)

- Born: 26 May 1934; London, England
- Died: 30 April 2004 (aged 69)
- Education: Magdalen College, Oxford (BA, BA); King's College London (PhD)
- Known for: Gray's biopsychological theory of personality
- Scientific career
- Fields: Clinical psychology
- Workplaces: University of Oxford; Institute of Psychiatry
- Thesis: The relation between stimulus intensity and response strength in the context of Pavlovian personality theory (1964)

Jeffrey Alan Gray (26 May 1934 – 30 April 2004) was a British research psychologist. He is known for his biopsychological theory of personality. He is also notable for his contributions to the theory of consciousness.

== Life and work ==
He was born in the East End of London. His father was a tailor, but died when Jeffrey was only seven. His mother, who ran a haberdashery, brought him up alone. Following military service (1952–54), he took up a MacKinnon scholarship at Magdalen College, Oxford, with a place to study law. In the event he negotiated a switch to Modern Languages, obtaining a first in French and Spanish. He stayed on to take a second BA, this time in Psychology and Philosophy, which he completed in 1959.

In 1959–60, he trained as a clinical psychologist at the Institute of Psychiatry in London (now part of King's College London), after which he stayed on to study for a PhD in the department of psychology, headed by Hans Eysenck. His PhD was awarded in 1964 for a study of environmental, genetic and hormonal influences on emotional behaviour in animals.

He then took an appointment as a university lecturer in experimental psychology at Oxford. He remained at Oxford until succeeding Eysenck at the Institute of Psychiatry in 1983. He retired from the chair of psychology in 1999, but continued his experimental research as an emeritus professor, and spent a productive year at the Center for Advanced Study in the Behavioral Sciences at Stanford University, California. He served as the expert on psychology on the Gambling Review Body which produced the Gambling Review Report (2001).

== Gray's theory of consciousness ==
=== The importance of intentionality ===
In his book Consciousness: Creeping up on the Hard Problem written towards the end of his life, Gray summarised his ideas about brain function and consciousness. He took the view that the contents of consciousness are usually about something, and this is described as intentionality or meaning. He suggested that intentionality is another aspect of the "binding problem", as to how the different modalities, such as sight and hearing, are bound together into a single conscious experience. Gray argued that without such binding, eating a banana could involve seeing yellow, feeling a surface, and tasting something, without having the unifying awareness of a particular object known as a banana. Without such unifying binding, he argued that objects would be just meaningless shapes, edges, colours, and tastes.

Gray thought that intentionality was based on unconscious processing. For example, he argued that the processing in the visual cortex that underlies conscious perception is not itself conscious. Instead, perception springs into consciousness fully formed, including the intentionality of what the conscious perception is about. In arguing for this, Gray used the example of pictures that can be either of two things, such as a duck or a rabbit. They are never hybrid, but are always completely duck or completely rabbit. The perception of a duck or a rabbit is constructed unconsciously up to the last moment. Gray's conclusion from this part of his discussion is that intentionality arises from the physical and chemical structure of the brain, but also that if intentionality can be constructed out of unconscious processing, it is unlikely to produce a solution to the 'hard problem' of how consciousness arises.

=== Representation ===
Gray was opposed to the idea that the brain contains a representation of the external world. He considered that the external world, as described by physics, is nothing like how it appears in conscious perception. He also dismissed what he called the "fall back position", which is to think that the perception of something, a cow for example, is a representation, in the sense of resembling a cow as it really exists. Gray argued that our only direct knowledge of the cow is a brain state. We have no direct knowledge of the cow as it really is, and it is meaningless to say that the cow brain-state is a representation of the real cow.

Instead, Gray thought that conscious perceptions should be treated as signals. Signals have no need to resemble the thing about which they communicate. A whistle might warn thieves of the approach of a policeman, but a whistle is nothing like a policeman. Rather, perceptual experiences are signals about what observers might expect about their environments. However, Gray stressed that these perceptual signals arise in the brain, and do not have any kind of external existence. This is not to say that we cannot deduce useful information about the visual world from perception. Thus, for example, in his view, visual perception is a good guide to the reflectance of surfaces, which in turn often have survival value for the organism. Gray took the view that in investigating consciousness, discussions about intentionality and representation should be discarded, and research should be concentrated purely on qualia or subjective experience, as being the only aspect of the brain that involves consciousness.

=== Functions of consciousness ===
Gray viewed the function of consciousness as a 'late error detector'. He argued that the brain is a 'comparator system' that predicts what should happen, and detects departures from that prediction. He suggested that consciousness is particularly concerned with novelty and error. Gray also viewed it as something that causes us to review past actions, and to learn from errors in these actions. Late-error detection permits more successful adaption, if a similar situation emerges in the future. In respect of this, Gray gave the example of pain. We remove our hands from a hot surface, before consciously feeling the pain of touching it. Gray argued that the pain is a reversal of the action that led to it, and has the survival advantage of making a repetition of the damaging action less likely.

Gray accepted that there are many unconscious systems that detect errors, so this on its own does not establish a survival value for consciousness. However, he distinguished consciousness as being multi-modal, and as directing us towards whatever is most novel within several modalities. Gray argued that the brain takes account of plans as to what to do next, plus memories of past regularities, in assessing what is likely to be the next stage of a particular process. These predictions are submitted to a comparator, but still at an unconscious stage. Only the unexpected outcomes, or feedback for the continuation of motor action enters consciousness.

Gray regarded consciousness as a medium of display created by unconscious processing. He argued that the conscious display is used by unconscious systems, as in unconscious aversion to a food associated with a gastric illness. Conscious perception is in this theory created by unconscious systems, and used by other unconscious systems to respond to late errors, unexpectedness or novelty.

=== Consciousness and agency ===
Gray likened conscious perception to a sketch made of a particular scene that is retained for use as a record or reminder of that scene. In this way, the sketch is causal in the sense that it performs the function of recalling or assisting memories, but it is not directly active in the brain. In Gray's consciousness model, the conscious perception plays much the same role as the sketch in his analogy. Consciousness is causal, in the sense that downstream unconscious systems respond to it, mainly in the area of error correction. However, this conscious aspect of the brain has no agency or free will, with which to initiate or inhibit actions, any more than the sketch on a piece of paper can initiate actions independently.

=== Disagreement with functionalism ===
Gray disagreed with the functionalist theory of consciousness. He described the position of functionalism as saying that consciousness is the nature of certain complex systems, regardless of whether the systems are made of neurons, of silicon chips, or of some other material. The underlying tissues or machinery are irrelevant. Further to that consciousness relates only to functions performed by the brain or other system, and does not arise as a result of anything that is not functional. For any discriminated difference in qualia, there must be a difference in function. In the functionalist theory, for every discriminated difference in function, there is a difference in qualia.

In discussing this question further, Gray looked at synaesthesia, where he described modalities as becoming mixed, for example when sounds are experienced with colour. Experimentation in recent years has demonstrated that such synaesthesia is most likely from abnormal projections from the auditory cortex into the V4 colour region of the visual cortex. Brain scanning studies have shown that when words are spoken, in addition to the normal activity in the auditory cortex, the V4 colour vision area in the visual cortex became active, in a way which does not occur in people without synaesthesia. There was no related activation in V1 or V2, the earlier stages of the visual pathway.

Gray argued from these findings that there was no relationship between the occurrence of the synaesthete's colour experience and the linguistic function that triggers them, that there was no evidence the experience of colour has any function, refuting the functionalist theory of consciousness.

Gray also discussed the Penrose/Hameroff Orch-OR theory of consciousness. His main objection to it is the question as to why particular wave function collapses should select for one particular quale. He also questioned the temporal aspect of Hameroff's model, where the proposed 25 milliseconds to wave function collapse is only a tenth of the time considered necessary for a conscious perception to form.

== Publications ==
=== Books ===
- Gray, J. A. (1964). Pavlov's Typology. Elsevier ISBN 0-08-010076-7
- Gray, J. A. (1975). Elements of a Two-Process Theory of Learning. London: Academic Press. ISBN 0-12-296850-6
- Gray, J. A. (1979). Pavlov. Fontana Modern Masters
- Gray, J. A. (1987). The neuropsychology of anxiety. OUP. ISBN 0-19-852127-8
- Gray, J. A. (1987). The psychology of fear and stress (2nd ed.). Cambridge: Cambridge University Press.
- Gray, J. A., & McNaughton, N. (2000). The neuropsychology of anxiety (2nd ed). (Revised version with theoretical implications)
- Gray, J. A. (2004). Consciousness: Creeping up on the hard problem OUP. ISBN 0-19-852090-5

=== Book chapters ===
- Gray, J. A. (1981). A critique of Eysenck's theory of personality. In H. J. Eysenck (Ed.), A model for personality (pp. 246–276). New York: Springer.
- Gray, J. A. (1994). Framework for a taxonomy of psychiatric disorder. In S. H. M. van Goozen, & Van de Poll, Nanne E. (Eds.), Emotions: Essays on emotion theory. (pp. 29–59). Mahwah, NJ: Lawrence Erlbaum Associates, Inc.

=== Papers ===
- Gray, J. A. (1970). The psychophysiological basis of introversion-extraversion. Behaviour Research & Therapy, Vol. 8(3), 249–266.
- Gray, J. A. (1990). Brain systems that mediate both emotion and cognition. Cognition & Emotion, 4(3), 269–288.
- Gray, J. A. (2002) Implications of synaesthesia for functionalism: theory and experiments Journal of Consciousness Studies 9 (12), 5–31
- Nunn, J. A. et al. (2002) Functional magnetic resonance imaging of synaesthesia: activation of V4/V8 by spoken words Nature Neuroscience 5, 371–5
- Baron-Cohen, S. et al. (1993) Coloured speech perception: is synaesthesia what happens when modularity breaks down? Perception, 22, 419–26
- Quantum-mind

=== Critiques ===
- Higgins, E. Tory (1997). Beyond Pleasure and Pain. American Psychologist, 52(12), 1280–1300.

== See also ==
- Reinforcement sensitivity theory
- Gray's biopsychological theory of personality
- Biological basis of personality

== Sources ==
Obituaries

- Guardian Obituary
- Hodges H, Harnad S, Finlay BL, Bloom P (2004). In Memoriam: Jeffrey Gray (1934–2004). Behavioral and Brain Sciences 27: 1–2. doi:10.1017/S0140525X04000019
