= Symptom Checklists "O" and "S" =

- Purpose: determine presence of neurotic disorders

Symptom Checklists "O" and "S" (KO "O" and KO "S") are self-report questionnaires used for determining the presence of neurotic disorders, assessment of changes of symptom intensity, and evaluation of effectiveness of treatment in terms of symptom reduction or intensification.

The KO "O" derives from SCL-90-R. In comparison to SCL-90-R it differs mainly in the lack of items referring to psychotic symptoms and inclusion of questions about the most common symptoms in patients with neurotic disorders observed between 1975 and 1978. KO "O" was designed as one of a set of tools used for collecting information about patients who begin treatment due to psychogenic functional disorders, and especially neurotic disorders. KO "O" was originally developed in Polish and later English, German and Russian adaptations of the questionnaire were created.

Apart from KO "O", three other shorten Polish versions of the questionnaire – Symptom Checklist "S-I" (KO "S-I"), Symptom Checklist "S-II" (KO "S-II") and Symptom Checklist "S-III" (KO "S-III") – were designed to enable quick diagnosis of neurotic disorders (screening).

Both KO "O" and KO "S" were created by a team of researchers led by Jerzy Aleksandrowicz in the Psychotherapeutic Unit of the Psychiatry Department of the Jagiellonian University Medical College in Kraków, Poland. In 2000 in the Department of Psychotherapy of the Jagiellonian University Medical College in Kraków, Poland, KO "O" scales were updated. According to the authors, the observed changes in the prevalence of the particular symptoms in patients with neurotic disorders may compromise the usefulness of KO "O".

== Content of the KO "O" ==
The KO "O" consists of 138 closed-ended questions (including 3 that are repeated in order to verify reliability of a responder). Answers to the questions provide information about the presence and intensity of the disorders within the last 7 days prior the examination. Answering require from an individual to choose 1 of 4 optional answers concerning each symptom: (0) "the symptom was absent", (a) "it was present and it was mildly severe", (b) "it was present and it was moderately severe ", (c) "it was present and it was very severe".

The KO "S-III" (screening version), which was updated in 2011, consists of 82 items.

A set of all the answers determine the OWK coefficient that refers to the global intensity of symptoms typical for neurotic disorders. OWK coefficient allows quick diagnosis of a neurotic disorder (with above 90% accuracy), without indicating which particular neurotic disorder (in the terms of ICD-10 F-40 group) a patient is suffering from.

== KO "O" scales ==
Factor analysis lead to creation 14 KO "O" scales. 8 of those scales correspond to ICD-10 diagnostic units (however, the scales' values does not have diagnostic importance, instead the values have only descriptive significance).
