= Personality crisis =

Personality crisis may refer to one or more personality problems:

- Existential crisis
- Identity crisis, undeveloped or confused identity
- Midlife crisis

It may also refer to:

- Personality Crisis (band), a Canadian punk rock group
- Personality Crisis, an album by The Bear Quartet
- "Personality Crisis" (song), the lead track from the New York Dolls' self titled debut album
