= Gray's biopsychological theory of personality =

Theory of biological basis for human psychology, behavior, and personality

Gray's biopsychological theory of personality is a model of the general biological processes relevant for human psychology, behavior, and personality, proposed by research psychologist Jeffrey Alan Gray in 1970. The theory is well-supported by subsequent research and has general acceptance among professionals.

Gray hypothesized the existence of three brain-based systems for controlling a person's interactions with their environment: the behavioural inhibition system (BIS) and the behavioural activation system (BAS), and the fight, flight, or freezing system (FFFS). BIS is related to sensitivity to punishment and avoidance motivation. BAS is associated with sensitivity to reward and approach motivation. FFFS is associated with sensitivity to fear and how an individual responds to it. There is evidence that the Behavioral Inhibition and Behavioral Activations system are connected to mood control, with positive or negative emotions occurring when rewarded or punished. Those with a relatively high BAS are said to be extroverted and outgoing while those with a high BIS tend to be more reserved and introverted. Psychological scales have been designed to measure these hypothesized systems and study individual differences in personality. Neuroticism, a widely studied personality dimension related to emotional functioning, is positively correlated with BIS scales and negatively correlated with BAS scales.

== Background ==
The biopsychological theory of personality is similar to another one of Gray's theories, reinforcement sensitivity theory. The original version of Gray's reinforcement sensitivity theory of personality was developed in 1976 and Gray revised it independently in 1982. Then, in 2000, further and more thorough revisions were made alongside McNaughton. The purpose of the revision was to adapt the theory according to new inputs of scientific findings since the 1980s. Reinforcement sensitivity theory arose from the biopsychological theory of personality. The Biopsychological Theory of Personality was created in 1970 after Gray disagreed with Hans Eysenck's arousal theory that dealt with biological personality traits. According to Eysenck, differences in extraversion are a result of differences in sensitivity of the ascending reticular activating system. People with less sensitive systems are not easily aroused and seek additional stimulation, resulting in an extraverted personality. People with more sensitive systems are overstimulated and try to avoid additional stimulation, resulting in an introverted personality. People with a sensitivity dependent system will engage fight, flight, or freezing (FFFS) depending on the amount and type of stimuli present. They will tend to deal with the amount of stimuli present (fight) or avoid the stimuli (flight), resulting in a more tolerant introverted personality. Individuals may also not react to the stimuli, in which case they freeze.

The development of the biopsychological theory of personality occurred during Gray's time at Oxford where he was a fellow and lecturer.

Gray's main critique of Eysenck's theory was that introverts are not more sensitive to conditioning, but are more responsive to non reward and punishment. The evidence Gray collected for his hypothesis on the biological basis of personality comes from blink tests done on humans and studies done on animals injected with sodium amobarbital. Using animal subjects allows researchers to test whether different areas of the brain are responsible for different learning mechanisms. Specifically, Gray's theory concentrated on understanding how reward or punishment related to anxiety and impulsivity measures. His research and further studies have found that reward and punishment are under the control of separate systems and as a result people can have different sensitivities to such rewarding or punishing stimuli.

== Behavioral inhibition system ==
The behavioral inhibition system (BIS), as proposed by Gray, is a neuropsychological system that predicts an individual's response to anxiety-relevant cues in a given environment. This system is activated in times of punishment, boring things, or negative events. By responding to cues such as negative stimuli or events that involve punishment or frustration, this system ultimately results in avoidance of such negative and unpleasant events. According to Gray's theory, the BIS is related to sensitivity to punishment as well as avoidance motivation. It has also been proposed that the BIS is the causal basis of anxiety. High activity of the BIS means a heightened sensitivity to nonreward, punishment, and novel experience. This higher level of sensitivity to these cues results in a natural avoidance of such environments in order to prevent negative experiences such as fear, anxiety, frustration, and sadness. People who are highly sensitive to punishment perceive punishments as more aversive and are more likely to be distracted by punishments.

The physiological mechanism behind the BIS is believed to be the septohippocampal system and its monoaminergic afferents from the brainstem. Using a voxel-based morphometry analysis, the volume of the regions mentioned was assessed to view individual differences. Findings may suggest a correlation between the volume and anxiety-related personality traits. Results were found in the orbitofrontal cortex, the precuneus, the amygdala, and the prefrontal cortex.

== Behavioral activation system ==
The behavioral activation system (BAS), in contrast to the BIS, is based on a model of appetitive motivation - in this case, an individual's natural disposition to pursue and achieve goals. The BAS is aroused when it receives cues corresponding to rewards and controls actions that are not related to punishment, rather actions regulating approachment type behaviors. This system has an association with hope. According to Gray's theory, the BAS is sensitive to conditioned appealing stimuli, and is associated with impulsivity. It is also thought to be related to sensitivity to reward as well as approach motivation. The BAS is sensitive to nonpunishment and reward. Individuals with a highly active BAS show higher levels of positive emotions such as elation, happiness, and hope in response to environmental cues consistent with nonpunishment and reward, along with goal-achievement. In terms of personality, these individuals are also more likely to engage in goal-directed efforts and experience these positive emotions when exposed to impending reward. BAS is considered to include trait impulsivity that is also related to psychopathological disorders such as ADHD, substance use disorder, and alcohol use disorder. The higher the BAS score, or the higher the impulsive, the more it is likely to be related to psycho-pathological or dis-inhibitory disorders. Certain aspects of the dopaminergic reward system activate when reward cues and reinforcers are presented, including biological rewards such as food and sex. These brain areas, which were highlighted during multiple fMRI studies, are the same areas associated with BAS. The BAS is believed to play a role in romantic love.

== Fight, flight, freeze system ==
The fight, flight, freezing system (FFFS) is based on an individual's reaction to extreme situations in which they decide whether or not to fight or flee, or rather freeze in place, as a reaction to the stimuli. An individual scores high in this category if they either fight or flee in the given situation, meaning that the "fight" and "flee" reaction are equally scored with fighting not scoring higher than fleeing, vice versa. Although a number of combinations could result in an individual scoring high in FFFS, research has suggested that having a higher flight and freeze response associated with a lower fighting response consistently suggests that a person is high in FFFS. The only scenario that it seems that a person higher in FFFS will engage in fighting is when the distance between them and a threat is close to zero.

This theory is all about the different levels of extreme that people react with when placed in these situations. This system differs from BIS in the way that FFFS is about how individuals react to unconditioned responses, for example something that individuals would not expect to experience. For this reason, FFFS is generally perceived as an adrenaline rush instead of a deliberate reaction. While FFFS is more in the moment reaction to intense situations, BIS and BAS are more outcome oriented. For this reason, FFFS is commonly utilized in sudden unexpected situations while BIS and BAS are utilized for everyday life. BIS, BAS, and FFFS are connected though. Someone who is more sensitive to their BIS generally reacts with the flight response of FFFS. Likewise, someone who is more sensitive to their BAS generally reacts with the fight response of FFFS.

== Comparative analysis of BIS and BAS ==
Together, BIS and BAS work in an inverse relationship and FFFS works as an adrenaline output of one of the other two. In other words, when a specific situation occurs, an organism can approach the situation with one of the three systems. The systems will not be stimulated at the same time and which system is dominant depends on the situation in terms of punishment versus reward or the unexpected magnitude of the situation. Specifically, each system gets activated due to varying stimuli that may be present. BIS is activated when potential conflict arises pertaining to a specific goal and the individual has to decide how to overcome this. BAS is more so activated pertaining to rewarding stimuli and the individual thinking how to perform a specific task properly to achieve the reward being sought after. FFFS is activated when a threatening stimulus is present, and the individual must decide how to react to the new threat. This phenomenon of the differentiation between BIS, BAS, and FFFS is thought to occur because of the distinct areas in the brain that become activated in response to different stimuli. This difference was noted years ago through electrical stimulation of the brain.

The three systems differ in their physiological pathways in the brain. The inhibition system has been shown to be linked to the septo-hippocampal system which appears to have a close correlation to a serotonergic pathway, with similarities in their innervations and stress responses. The neural pathway associated with BIS is parallel to the pathway for FFFS. Although different, each of the neural streams have nuclei in them that activate anxiety or fear. The extent of the threat is assessed to determine whether the BIS or FFFS system will be activated. If the threat is something that is not necessarily life-threatening but can still induce feelings of anxiousness, the neural stream correlated to anxiety will dominate, and BIS will be activated. Contrary to this, if an individual feels as if their life is at risk, the nuclei pertaining to fear will engage and FFFS will be activated. On the other hand, the activation, or reward system, is thought to be associated more with a mesolimbic dopaminergic system as opposed to the serotonergic system.

The three systems proposed by Gray differ in their motivations and physiological responses. Gray also proposed that individuals can vary widely in their responsiveness of the behavioral inhibition system and the behavioral activation system by occasionally manifesting itself through the fight, flight, freezing system. It has been found that someone who is sensitive to their BIS will be more receptive to the negative cues as compared to someone who is sensitive to their BAS and therefore responds more to cues in the environment that relate to that system, specifically positive or rewarding cues. Someone who is more sensitive to their BIS will generally respond with the flight response of FFFS when faced with intense situations, while someone who is more sensitive to their BAS will generally respond with the fight response of FFFS.

Researchers besides Gray have shown interest in this theory and have created questionnaires that measure BIS and BAS sensitivity. Carver and White have been the primary researchers responsible for the questionnaire. Carver and White created a scale that has been shown to validly measure levels of individual scores of BIS and BAS. This measure focuses on the differences in incentive motivations and aversive motivations. As previously mentioned these motivations correlate to impulsivity and anxiety respectively.

== Comparison of biological theories of personality ==
It is important to analyze the difference between Eysenck's and Gray's theories of personality as Gray's theory itself arose from a critique of Eysenck's theory. After Eysenck's biology based "top-down" theory of personality, Gray proposed an alternative, "bottom-up" explanation called the Biopsychological Theory of Personality. Contrary to his previous theory called the reinforcement sensitivity theory, the biopsychological theory of personality is a theory of personality that puts an emphasis on the differences among individuals in different areas of the brain that are responsible for the facets of personality. Gray's Theory differed from Eysenck's as Eysenck's theory involved three dimensions: Extraversion, Neuroticism, and Psychoticism. Each dimension was related to how sensitive a person is to stimuli. For example, people who were rated as having stronger reactions to stimuli should be lower in Extraversion as the strong sensation is uncomfortable to them, according to Eysenck's theory. Gray's theory relies more heavily on physiological explanation versus arousability which was used to explain Eysenck's theory. Gray's theory involves the Behavioral Activation System and Behavioral Inhibition System and how these systems affect personality. While different in some regard, it has also been proposed with some evidence that there is a correlation between Gray's BIS and Eysenck's Neuroticism. Gray's BAS also has evidence of correlation to Eysenck's Extraversion.

== Testing methods and assessment ==
Since the development of the BAS and BIS, tests have been created to see how individuals rate in each area. The questionnaire is called the Behavioral Inhibition System and Behavioral Activation System Questionnaire.

People can be tested based on their activation of either systems by using an EEG. These tests will conclude whether a person has a more active BIS or BAS. The two systems are independent of each other.

These tests can determine different things about a person's personality. They can determine if a person has more positive or negative moods. Using psychological test scales designed to correlate with the attributes of these hypothesized systems, neuroticism has been found to be positively correlated with the BIS scale, and negatively correlated with the BAS scale.

According to Richard Depue's BAS dysregulation theory of bipolar disorders, now doctors and other professionals can determine if a person with bipolar disorder is on the brink of a manic or depressive episode based on how they rate on a scale of BAS and BIS sensitivity. Essentially, this dysregulation theory proposes that people with BAS dysregulation have an extraordinarily sensitive behavioral activation system and their BAS is hyper-responsive to behavioral approach system cues. If a person with bipolar disorder self-reports high sensitivity to BAS, it means that a manic episode could occur faster. Also, if a person with bipolar disorder reports high sensitivity to BIS it could indicate a depressive phase. A better understanding of BAS dysregulation theory can inform psychosocial intervention (e.g. cognitive behavioral therapy, psychoeducation, interpersonal and social rhythm therapy, etc.).

The BAS/BIS Questionnaire can also be used in the cases of criminal profiling. Previous research as reported by researchers MacAndrew and Steele in 1991 compared two groups on opposite spectrum levels of fear and the response of a variety of questions. The two groups in the study varied on levels of BIS, either high or low, and were selected by the researchers. One group was composed of women who had experienced anxiety attacks and together made up the high BIS group. The low BIS group was composed of convicted prostitutes who had been found to take part in illegal behavior. Main findings showed that the responses to the questionnaires were distinctly different between the high BIS group and the low BIS group, with the convicted women scoring lower. Results from this study demonstrate that questionnaires can be used as a valid measurement to show differences in the behavioral inhibition systems of different types of people. Gray also introduced his SPSRQ questionnaire to measure sensitivity to reward (SR) and sensitivity to punishment (SP) in anxiety (2012). It is a specifically designed questionnaire linking to Gray's theory referencing the SR to the BAS and the SP to the BIS.
