= Extraversion and introversion =

Personality traits

Behavioral and psychological characteristics distinguishing introversion and extraversion, which are generally conceived as lying along a continuum

Extraversion and introversion are a central trait dimension in human personality theory. The terms were introduced into psychology by Carl Jung, though both the popular understanding and current psychological usage are not the same as Jung's original concept. Extraversion (also spelled extroversion) is typically associated with sociability, talkativeness, and high energy, while introversion is linked to introspection, reserve, and a preference for solitary activities. Jung defined introversion as an "attitude-type characterised by orientation in life through subjective psychic contents", and extraversion as "an attitude-type characterised by concentration of interest on the external object". In psychology, these are viewed as personality traits that can be measured in degrees, rather than placing people into fixed categories.

While often presented as opposite ends of a single continuum, personality theorists such as Carl Jung have said that most individuals possess elements of both traits, with one being more dominant depending on the situation. Most modern models of personality include these concepts in various forms. Examples include the Big Five model, Jung's analytical psychology, Hans Eysenck's three-factor model, Raymond Cattell's 16 personality factors, and the Minnesota Multiphasic Personality Inventory.

== History ==
In September 1909, Swiss psychiatrist Carl Jung used the term introverted in a lecture at Clark University. A transcript of this lecture was then published with two others in a journal in 1910, the first time the term appeared in print. In the lecture he mentions that love that is "introverted ... is turned inward into the subject and there produces increased imaginative activity".

His 1921 book Psychologische Typen was published as Psychological Types in English in 1923. It described the "introverted" in detail for the first time. In his later paper, "Psychologische Typologie", he gives a more concise definition of the introverted type, writing:

He holds aloof from external happenings, does not join in, has a distinct dislike of society as soon as he finds himself among too many people. In a large gathering he feels lonely and lost. The more crowded it is, the greater becomes his resistance. He is not in the least "with it," and has no love of enthusiastic get-togethers. He is not a good mixer. What he does, he does in his own way, barricading himself against influences from outside. He is apt to appear awkward, often seeming inhibited, and it frequently happens that, by a certain brusqueness of manner, or by his glum unapproachability, or some kind of malapropism, he causes unwitting offence to people ...

For him self-communings are a pleasure. His own world is a safe harbor, a carefully tended and walled-in garden, closed to the public and hidden from prying eyes. His own company is the best. He feels at home in his world, where the only changes are made by himself. His best work is done with his own resources, on his own initiative, and in his own way...

Crowds, majority views, public opinion, popular enthusiasm never convince him of anything, but mere make him creep still deeper into his shell.

His relations with other people become warm only when safety is guaranteed, and when he can lay aside his defensive distrust. All too often he cannot, and consequently the number of friends and acquaintances is very restricted.

In the 1950s, British psychologist Hans Eysenck theorized that the trait of introversion-extraversion could be explained in terms of Clark Hull's drive theory of motivation. He later developed his own arousal theory to explain individual differences in the trait, suggesting that the brains of extraverts were chronically under-aroused, leading them to seek out stimulation from the environment. Introverts, being more cortically aroused, avoid overstimulating environments. The trait of introversion-extraversion would become one of three central traits in Eysenck's PEN theory of personality.

== Varieties ==
William McDougall discussed Jung's conception, and reached this conclusion: "the introverts are those in whom reflective thought inhibits and postpones action and expression: the extroverts are those in whom the energies liberated upon the stirring of any propensity flow out freely in outward action and expression."

=== Extraversion ===
Extraversion is the state of primarily obtaining gratification from outside oneself. An extraverted person is likely to enjoy time spent with people and find less reward in time spent alone. They tend to be energized when around other people, and they are more prone to boredom when they are by themselves. Research has shown that extraversion is considered to be on a spectrum instead of being fixed. This means that people display differing levels of either extroverted or introverted tendencies in many different situations (McCrae & Costa, 2008).

=== Introversion ===
Introversion is the state of primarily obtaining gratification from one's own mental life. Some popular psychologists have characterized introverts as people whose energy tends to expand through reflection and dwindle during interaction. This is similar to Jung's view, although he focused on mental energy rather than physical energy. Few modern conceptions make this distinction. Introverts often take pleasure in solitary activities such as reading, writing, or meditating. An introvert is likely to enjoy time spent alone and find less reward in time spent with large groups of people. Introverts are easily overwhelmed by too much stimulation from social gatherings and engagement, introversion having even been defined by some in terms of a preference for a quiet, more minimally stimulating external environment. They prefer to concentrate on a single activity at a time and like to observe situations before they participate. This is especially observed in developing children and adolescents. They are more analytical before speaking. These differences are often connected to how much stimulation a person prefers, with some people feeling more comfortable in quieter settings and others enjoying more active, social environments.

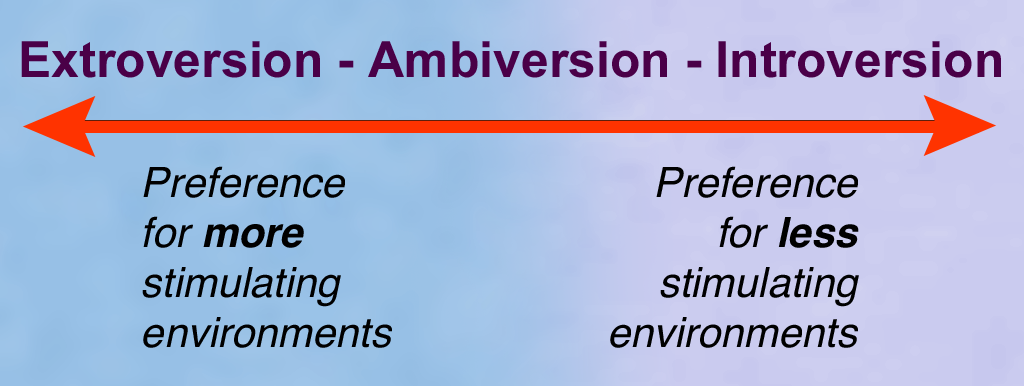
Quiet: The Power of Introverts... author Susan Cain defines introversion and extraversion in terms of preferences for different levels of stimulation—distinguishing it from shyness (fear of social judgment and humiliation).

Mistaking introversion for shyness is a common error. Introversion is a preference, while shyness stems from distress. Introverts prefer solitary to social activities, but do not necessarily fear social encounters like shy people do. Susan Cain, author of the book Quiet: The Power of Introverts in a World That Can't Stop Talking, argues that modern Western culture misjudges the capabilities of introverted people, leading to a waste of talent, energy, and happiness. Cain describes how society is biased against introverts, and that, with people being taught from childhood that to be sociable is to be happy, introversion is now considered "somewhere between a disappointment and pathology". In contrast, Cain says that introversion is not a "second-class" trait but that both introverts and extraverts enrich society, with examples including the introverts Isaac Newton, Albert Einstein, Mahatma Gandhi, Dr. Seuss, W. B. Yeats, Steven Spielberg, J. K. Rowling, and Larry Page.

=== Ambiversion ===
Most contemporary trait theories measure levels of extraversion-introversion as part of a single, continuous dimension of personality, with some scores near one end, and others near the halfway mark. Ambiversion is falling more or less in the middle, or having characteristics of both extroversion and introversion. The concept of ambiversion was proposed by American psychologist Edmund Smith Conklin in 1923, but did not gain popularity until 2013 after American psychologist Adam Grant published research on it.

=== Omniversion ===
Omniversion is a state where one is either in an extreme state of introversion or an extreme state of extroversion with no in-between depending on a situation or mood. However, the term is perceived as a pop-psychology construct, and experts are skeptical of its validity. Richard Robins, a professor at the University of California, Davis, stated that omniversion in his experience "doesn't exist—[I don't believe] that someone would oscillate between these two extremes. It's clearly possible for someone to act very extroverted in one specific situation and very introverted in another specific situation. What I don't think is possible is for someone to be in a hundred different situations and always act either extremely extroverted or extremely introverted in all of them, and never somewhere in the middle."

=== Otroversion ===
Otroversion is claimed to be a variety in the central trait dimension and coined by American psychiatrist Rami Kaminski in 2025. Kaminski described otroverts as "perpetual outsiders" in group settings, even when the person is friendly, socially capable, and socially included. The otrovert may never feel as if they belong to any group, broadly consistent with initial Carl Jung's point about most individuals having elements of both introvert and extravert traits. Otroverts emphasize emotional independence from groups, original thinking, low interest in joining or adopting group rituals, and a preference for selective one-on-one connections over group affiliation. Some commentators have described the concept as broadening our understanding of personality types and that otroversion defies groupthink, while others view the concept as a recent hypothesis as opposed to an established category in academic personality psychology.

=== Relative prevalence ===
Research indicates that the prevalence of extraversion is greater for people at progressively higher management levels.

Quiet author Susan Cain reported studies indicating that 33–50% of the American population are introverts. A 6,000-subject MBTI-based survey in 2016 indicated that 60% of attorneys, and specifically 90% of intellectual property attorneys, were introverts.

== Measurement ==
The extent of extraversion and introversion is most commonly assessed through self-report measures, although peer-reports and third-party observation can also be used. Self-report measures are either lexical or based on statements. The type of measure is determined by an assessment of psychometric properties, and the time and space constraints of the research being undertaken.

=== Lexical self-reporting ===
Lexical measures use individual adjectives that reflect extravert and introvert traits, such as outgoing, talkative, reserved and quiet. Words representing introversion are reverse-coded to create composite measures of extraversion-introversion running on a continuum. Goldberg (1992) developed a 20-word measure as part of his 100-word Big Five markers. Saucier (1994) developed a briefer 8-word measure as part of his 40-word mini-markers. However, the psychometric properties of Saucier's original mini-markers have been found to be suboptimal with samples outside of North America. As a result, a systematically revised measure was developed to have better psychometric properties, the International English Mini-Markers. The International English Mini-Markers has good internal consistency reliabilities, and other validity, for assessing extraversion-introversion and other five-factor personality dimensions, both within and, especially, without American populations. Internal consistency reliability of the extraversion measure for native English-speakers is reported as a Cronbach's alpha (α) of 0.92, that for non-native English-speakers is α of 0.85.

=== Statement self-reporting ===
Statement measures tend to contain more words, and hence consume more research instrument space, than lexical measures. Respondents are asked the extent to which they, for example, "Talk to a lot of different people at parties or often feel uncomfortable around others". While some statement-based measures of extraversion-introversion have similarly acceptable psychometric properties in North American populations to lexical measures, their generally emic development makes them less suited to use in other populations. For example, statements asking about talkativeness in parties are hard to answer meaningfully by those who do not attend parties, as Americans are assumed to do. Moreover, the sometimes colloquial North American language of statements makes them less suited for use outside America. For instance, statements like "Keep in the background" and "Know how to captivate people" are sometimes hard for non-native English-speakers to understand, except in a literal sense.

=== Eysenck's theory ===
Hans Eysenck described extraversion-introversion as the degree to which a person is outgoing and interactive with other people. These behavioral differences are presumed to be the result of underlying differences in brain physiology. Eysenck associated cortical inhibition and excitation with the ascending reticular activation system (ARAS), a pathway located in the brainstem. Extraverts seek excitement and social activity in an effort to raise their naturally low arousal level, whereas introverts tend to avoid social situations in an effort to avoid raising their naturally high arousal level too far. Eysenck designated extraversion as one of three major traits in his P-E-N model of personality, which also includes psychoticism and neuroticism.

Eysenck originally suggested that extraversion was a combination of two major tendencies, impulsiveness and sociability. He later added several other more specific traits, namely liveliness, activity level, and excitability. These traits are further linked in his personality hierarchy to even more specific habitual responses, such as partying on the weekend.

Eysenck compared this trait to the four temperaments of ancient medicine, with choleric and sanguine temperaments equating to extraversion, and melancholic and phlegmatic temperaments equating to introversion.

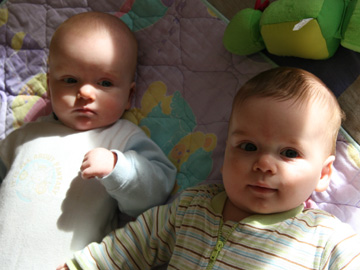
Twin studies indicate that extraversion-introversion has a genetic component

=== Biological factors ===
The relative importance of nature versus environment in determining the level of extraversion is controversial and the focus of many studies. Twin studies have found a genetic component of 39% to 58%. In terms of the environmental component, the shared family environment appears to be far less important than individual environmental factors that are not shared between siblings.

Eysenck proposed that extraversion was caused by variability in cortical arousal. He hypothesized that introverts are characterized by higher levels of activity than extraverts and so are chronically more cortically aroused than extraverts. That extraverts require more external stimulation than introverts has been interpreted as evidence for this hypothesis. Other evidence of the "stimulation" hypothesis is that introverts salivate more than extraverts in response to a drop of lemon juice. This is due to increased activity in their Reticular Activating System, which responds to stimuli like food or social contact.

Extraversion has been linked to higher sensitivity of the mesolimbic dopamine system to potentially rewarding stimuli. This in part explains the high levels of positive affect found in extraverts, since they will more intensely feel the excitement of a potential reward. One consequence of this is that extraverts can more easily learn the contingencies for positive reinforcement, since the reward itself is experienced as greater.

One study found that introverts have more blood flow in the frontal lobes of their brain and the anterior or frontal thalamus, which are areas dealing with internal processing, such as planning and problem solving. Extraverts have more blood flow in the anterior cingulate gyrus, temporal lobes, and posterior thalamus, which are involved in sensory and emotional experience. This study and other research indicate that introversion-extraversion is related to individual differences in brain function. A study on regional brain volume found a positive correlation between introversion and grey matter volume in the right prefrontal cortex and right temporoparietal junction, as well as a positive correlation between introversion and total white matter volume. Task-related functional neuroimaging has shown that extraversion is associated with increased activity in the anterior cingulate gyrus, prefrontal cortex, middle temporal gyrus, and the amygdala.

Extraversion has also been linked to physiological factors such as respiration, through its association with surgency.

== Behavior ==
Various differences in behavioral characteristics are attributed to extraverts and introverts. According to one study, extraverts tend to wear more decorative clothing, whereas introverts prefer practical, comfortable clothes. Extraverts are more likely to prefer more upbeat, conventional, and energetic music than introverts. Personality also influences how people arrange their work areas. In general, extraverts decorate their offices more, keep their doors open, keep extra chairs nearby, and are more likely to put dishes of candy on their desks. These are attempts to invite co-workers and encourage interaction. Introverts, in contrast, decorate less and tend to arrange their workspace to discourage social interaction.

Despite these differences, a meta-analysis of 15 experience sampling studies has suggested that there is a great deal of overlap in the way that extraverts and introverts behave. In these studies, participants used mobile devices to report how extraverted (e.g., bold, talkative, assertive, outgoing) they were acting at multiple times during their daily lives. Fleeson and Gallagher (2009) found that extraverts regularly behave in an introverted way, and introverts regularly behave in an extraverted way. Indeed, there was more within-person variability than between-person variability in extraverted behaviors. The key feature that distinguishes extraverts and introverts was that extraverts tend to act moderately extraverted about 5–10% more often than introverts. From this perspective, extraverts and introverts are not "fundamentally different". Rather, an "extravert" is just someone who acts more extraverted more often, suggesting that extraversion is more about what one "does" than what one "has".

Additionally, a study by Lippa (1978) found evidence for the extent to which individuals present themselves in a different way. This is called expressive behavior, and it is dependent upon the individuals' motivation and ability to control that behavior. Lippa examined 68 students who were asked to role-play by pretending to teach a math class. The students' level of extraversion and introversion were rated based on their external/expressive behaviors such as stride length, graphic expansiveness, the percentage of time they spent talking, the amount of time they spent making eye contact, and the total time of each teaching session. This study found that actual introverts were perceived and judged as having more extraverted-looking expressive behaviors because they were higher in terms of their self-monitoring. This means that the introverts consciously put more effort into presenting a more extraverted, and rather socially desirable, version of themselves. Thus, individuals are able to regulate and modify behavior based on their environmental situations.

Humans are complex and unique, and because introversion-extraversion varies along a continuum, individuals may have a mixture of both orientations. People are also able to step outside of their usual tendencies when needed, especially in situations that require a different type of behavior. A person who acts introverted in one situation may act extraverted in another, and people can learn to act in "counter dispositional" ways in certain situations. For example, Brian Little's free trait theory suggests that people can take on "free traits", behaving in ways that may not be their "first nature", but can strategically advance projects that are important to them. Together, this presents an optimistic view of what extraversion is. Rather than being fixed and stable, individuals vary in their extraverted behaviors across different moments, and can choose to act extraverted to advance important personal projects or even increase their happiness, as mentioned above. This elasticity in behavior, however, may have limits: in contrast with individuals with at least average levels of extraversion, strongly introverted individuals can feel less authentic, more tired, and experience more negative feelings when acting out of character for too long.

== Implications ==
Researchers have found a correlation between extraversion and self-reported happiness. That is, more extraverted people tend to report higher levels of happiness than introverts. Other research has shown that being instructed to act in an extraverted manner leads to increases in positive affect, even for people who are trait-level introverts, although this may come at a cost: more introverted individuals experienced smaller boosts in positive affect, while also experiencing decreased feelings of authenticity and increased negative affect and tiredness.

Extraverts report experiencing more positive emotions, whereas introverts tend to be closer to neutral. This may be because extraversion is socially preferable in contemporary Western culture and thus introversion feels less desirable. For example, in a sample of Australian participants, most subjects held so-called "extraversion-deficit" beliefs, or the belief that it would be desirable to become more extraverted than they currently were. While introverts in the study (i.e., participants scoring below the median) held such beliefs to a higher extent on average and were more impacted by them, the introverts with the lowest levels of extraversion-deficit beliefs reported higher levels of well-being as they reported feeling more authentic. The suggested implications for introverts were to develop a more positive attitude towards their introversion while focusing on developing their strengths.

In addition to the research on happiness, other studies have found that extraverts tend to report higher levels of self-esteem than introverts. Others suggest that such results reflect socio-cultural bias in the survey itself. Dr. David Meyers has claimed that happiness is a matter of possessing three traits: self-esteem, optimism, and extraversion. Meyers bases his conclusions on studies that report extraverts to be happier; these findings have been questioned in light of the fact that the "happiness" prompts given to the studies' subjects, such as "I like to be with others" and "I'm fun to be with," only measure happiness among extraverts. Also, according to Carl Jung, introverts acknowledge more readily their psychological needs and problems, whereas extraverts tend to be oblivious to them because they focus more on the outer world.

Although extraversion is perceived as socially desirable in Western culture, it is not always an advantage. For example, extraverted youths are more likely to engage in antisocial or delinquent behavior. In line with this, certain evidence suggests that the trait of extraversion may also be related to that of psychopathy. Conversely, while introversion is perceived as less socially desirable, it is strongly associated with positive traits such as intelligence and "giftedness." Though more recent, large-scale meta-analyses have found that the activity facet of extraversion has the most sizable positive relations with cognitive abilities. For many years, researchers have found that introverts tend to be more successful in academic environments, which extraverts may find boring.

Research shows that the behavioral immune system, the psychological processes that infer infection risk from perceptual cues and respond to these perceptual cues through the activation of aversive emotions, may influence gregariousness. Although extraversion is associated with many positive outcomes like higher levels of happiness, those extraverted people are also more likely to be exposed to communicable diseases, such as airborne infections, as they tend to have more contact with people. When individuals are more vulnerable to infection, the cost of being social will be relatively greater. Therefore, people tend to be less extraversive when they feel vulnerable and vice versa.

== Regional variation ==
Some claim that Americans live in an "extraverted society" that rewards extravert behavior and rejects introversion. This is because the U.S. is a culture of external personality, whereas in some other cultures people are valued for their "inner selves and their moral rectitude". Other cultures, such as those in China, India, Japan, and regions where Eastern Orthodox Christianity, Buddhism, Hinduism, Sufism etc. prevail, prize introversion. These cultural differences predict individuals' happiness in that people who score higher in extraversion are happier, on average, in particularly extraverted cultures and vice versa. Despite this, extraverts are still seen as prototypical leaders in traditionally introverted cultures.

Researchers have found that people who live on islands tend to be less extraverted (more introverted) than those living on the mainland, and that people whose ancestors had inhabited the island for twenty generations tend to be less extraverted than more recent arrivals. Furthermore, people who emigrate from islands to the mainland tend to be more extraverted than people that stay on islands, and those that immigrate to islands.

In the United States, researchers have found that people living in the midwestern states of North Dakota, South Dakota, Nebraska, Minnesota, Wisconsin, and Illinois score higher than the U.S. average on extraversion. Utah and the southeastern states of Florida and Georgia also score high on this personality trait. The most introverted states in the U.S. are Maryland, New Hampshire, Alaska, Washington, Oregon, and Vermont. People who live in the northwestern states of Idaho, Montana, and Wyoming are also relatively introverted.

A study comparing regions in the United States found that mountainous terrain was associated with lower extraversion. That study also asked people to choose whether they preferred mountains or the beach. People who chose mountains were less extraverted on average than people who chose the beach.

== Relation to happiness ==
Extraverts are often found to have higher levels of positive affect than introverts. However, this relationship has only been found between extraversion and activated forms of positive affect. There is no relationship between extraversion and deactivated (calm) forms of positive affect such as contentment or serenity, although one study found a negative relationship between extraversion and deactivated positive affect (i.e. a positive relationship between introversion and calm positive affect). Moreover, the relationship between extraversion and activated positive affect is only significant for agentic extraversion, i.e. there is no significant relationship between affiliative extraversion and activated positive affect, especially when controlling for neuroticism.

An influential review article concluded that personality, specifically extraversion and emotional stability, was the best predictor of subjective well-being. As examples, Argyle and Lu (1990) found that the trait of extraversion, as measured by Extraversion Scale of the Eysenck Personality Questionnaire (EPQ), was positively and significantly correlated with positive affect, as measured by the Oxford Happiness Inventory. Using the same positive affect and extraversion scales, Hills and Argyle (2001) found that positive affect was again significantly correlated with extraversion. Also, the study by Emmons and Diener (1986) showed that extraversion correlates positively and significantly with positive affect but not with negative affect. Similar results were found in a large longitudinal study by Diener, Sandvik, Pavot, and Fujita (1992), which assessed 14,407 participants from 100 areas of continental United States. Using the abbreviated General Well-Being Schedule, which tapped positive and negative affects, and Costa and McCrae's (1986). short version of the NEO's Extraversion scale, the authors reported that extraverts experienced greater well-being at two points in time, during which data were collected: first between 1971 and 1975, and later between 1981 and 1984. However, the latter study did not control for neuroticism, an important covariate when investigating relationships between extraversion and positive affect or wellbeing. Studies that controlled for neuroticism have found no significant relationship between extraversion and subjective well-being. Larsen and Ketelaar (1991) showed that extraverts respond more to positive affect than to negative affect, since they exhibit more positive-affect reactivity to the positive-affect induction, yet they do not react more negatively to the negative-affect induction.

Recent longitudinal research by Joshanloo (2023), using a U.S. national dataset over two decades found that the increase in subjective well-being (SWB) predicted increases in extraversion, conscientiousness, and openness over time. Openness also predicted future increases in SWB, suggesting a reciprocal relationship. Joshanloo suggests that this challenges the traditional assumptions that personality traits solely predict well-being and suggests instead a bidirectional relationship. The same study found that neuroticism, while strongly correlated with SWB in cross-sectional data, showed no within-person temporal relationship with well-being.

=== Instrumental view ===
The instrumental view proposes that personality traits give rise to conditions and actions, which have affective consequences, and thus generate individual differences in emotionality.

==== Personality trait as a cause of higher sociability ====
According to the instrumental view, one explanation for greater subjective well-being among extraverts could be that extraversion helps in the creation of life circumstances, which promote high levels of positive affect. Specifically, the personality trait of extraversion is seen as a facilitator of more social interactions, since the low cortical arousal among extraverts results in them seeking more social situations in order to increase their arousal.

==== Social activity hypothesis ====
According to the social activity hypothesis, more frequent participation in social situations creates more frequent, and higher levels, of positive affect. Therefore, it is believed that since extraverts are characterized as more sociable than introverts, they also possess higher levels of positive affect brought on by social interactions. Specifically, the results of Furnham and Brewin's study (1990) suggest that extraverts enjoy and participate more in social activities than introverts, and as a result extraverts report a higher level of happiness. Also, in the study of Argyle and Lu (1990) extraverts were found to be less likely to avoid participation in noisy social activities, and to be more likely to participate in social activities such as party games, jokes, or going to the cinema. Similar results were reported by Diener, Larsen, and Emmons (1984) who found that extraverts seek social situations more often than introverts, especially when engaging in recreational activities.

However, a variety of findings contradict the claims of the social activity hypothesis. Firstly, it was found that extraverts were happier than introverts even when alone. Specifically, extraverts tend to be happier regardless of whether they live alone or with others, or whether they live in a vibrant city or quiet rural environment. Similarly, a study by Diener, Sandvik, Pavot, and Fujita (1992) showed that although extraverts chose social jobs relatively more frequently (51%) than nonsocial jobs compared to introverts (38%), they were happier than introverts regardless of whether their occupations had social or nonsocial character. Secondly, it was found that extraverts only sometimes reported greater amounts of social activity than introverts, but in general extraverts and introverts do not differ in the quantity of their socialization. Similar finding was reported by Srivastava, Angelo, and Vallereux (2008), who found that extraverts and introverts both enjoy participating in social interactions, but extraverts participate socially more. Thirdly, studies have shown that both extraverts and introverts participate in social relations, but that the quality of this participation differs. The more frequent social participation among extraverts could be explained by the fact that extraverts know more people, but those people are not necessarily their close friends, whereas introverts, when participating in social interactions, are more selective and have only few close friends with whom they have special relationships.

==== Social attention theory ====
Yet another explanation of the high correlation between extraversion and happiness comes from the study by Ashton, Lee, and Paunonen (2002). They suggested that the core element of extraversion is a tendency to behave in ways that attract, hold, and enjoy social attention, and not reward sensitivity. They claimed that one of the fundamental qualities of social attention is its potential of being rewarding. Therefore, if a person shows positive emotions of enthusiasm, energy, and excitement, that person is seen favorably by others and he or she gains others' attention. This favorable reaction from others likely encourages extraverts to engage in further extraverted behavior. Ashton, Lee, and Paunonen's (2002) study showed that their measure of social attention, the Social Attention Scale, was much more highly correlated with extraversion than were measures of reward sensitivity.

=== Temperamental view ===
Temperamental view is based on the notion that there is a direct link between people's personality traits and their sensitivity to positive and negative affects.

==== Affective reactivity model ====
The affective reactivity model states that the strength of a person's reactions to affect-relevant events are caused by people's differences in affect. This model is based on the reinforcement sensitivity theory by Jeffrey Alan Gray, which states that people with stronger behavioral activation system (BAS) are high in reward responsiveness and are predisposed to the personality trait of extraversion, while people with a stronger behavioral inhibition system (BIS) are lower in reward responsiveness and are more predisposed to personality trait of neuroticism and introversion. Therefore, extraverts are seen as having a temperamental predisposition to positive affect since positive mood induction has a greater effect on them than on introverts, thus extraverts are more prone to react to pleasant effects. For example, Gable, Reis, and Elliot (2000). found in two consecutive studies that people with more sensitive BIS reported higher levels of average negative affect, while people with more sensitive BAS reported higher levels of positive affect. Also, Zelenski and Larsen (1999) found that people with more sensitive BAS reported more positive emotions during the positive mood induction, while people with more sensitive BIS reported more negative emotions during the negative mood induction.

==== Social reactivity theory ====
The social reactivity theory alleges that all humans, whether they like it or not, are required to participate in social situations. Since extraverts prefer engaging in social interactions more than introverts, they also derive more positive affect from such situations than introverts do. The support for this theory comes from work of Brian R. Little, who popularized concept of "restorative niches". Little claimed that life often requires people to participate in social situations, and since acting social is out of character for introverts, it was shown to harm their well-being. Therefore, one way to preserve introverts' well-being is for them to recharge as often as possible in places where they can return to their true selves—places Little calls "restorative niches".

However, it was also found that extraverts did not respond stronger to social situations than introverts, nor did they report bigger boosts of positive affect during such interactions.

==== Affective regulation ====
Another possible explanation for more happiness among extraverts comes from the fact that extraverts are able to better regulate their affective states. This means that in ambiguous situations (situations where positive and negative moods are introduced and mixed in similar proportions) extraverts show a slower decrease of positive affect, and, as a result, they maintained a more positive affect balance than introverts. Extraverts may also choose activities that facilitate happiness (e.g., recalling pleasant vs. unpleasant memories) more than introverts when anticipating difficult tasks.

==== The set-point model aka affect-level model ====
According to the set-point model, levels of positive and negative affects are more or less fixed within each individual, hence, after a positive or negative event, people's moods tend to go back to the pre-set level. According to the set-point model, extraverts experience more happiness because their pre-set level of positive affect is set higher than the pre-set point of positive affect in introverts, therefore extraverts require less positive reinforcement in order to feel happy.

==== Pleasure-arousal relation ====
A study by Peter Kuppens (2008) showed that extraverts and introverts engage in different behaviors when feeling pleasant, which may explain underestimation of the frequency and intensity of happiness exhibited by introverts. Specifically, Kuppens (2008) found that arousal and pleasantness are positively correlated for extraverts, which means that pleasant feelings are more likely to be accompanied by high arousal for extraverts. On the other hand, arousal and pleasantness are negatively correlated for introverts, resulting in introverts exhibiting low arousal when feeling pleasant. In other words, if everything is going well in an extravert's life, which is a source of pleasant feelings, extraverts see such a situation as an opportunity to engage in active behavior and goal pursuit, which brings about an active, aroused pleasant state. When everything is going well for introverts, they see it as an opportunity to let down their guard, resulting in them feeling relaxed and content.

=== Internalization and Self-Deception ===
Recent research has explored how self-perception can shift following intentional self-presentation. A study by Ueda, Yamagata, and Kiyokawa (2024) found that individuals instructed to present themselves as extraverted later rated themselves as more extraverted, even when external observers did not perceive them as such.

The study showed that:

- Internalization occurred primarily for extraversion, not introversion
- High self-deceivers - individuals who tend to hold unrealistically positive self-beliefs—were more likely to internalize extraversion based on how well they believed they performed, not on actual performance.

This phenomenon, called internalization of self-presentation (IOSP), is thought to be driven by self-presentation efficacy—a person's belief that they have effectively conveyed a desired impression.

=== Complications to the extraversion-happiness correlation ===
Extraversion is positively associated with subjective well-being. Extraverts typically report greater life satisfaction and more frequent positive emotions. However, this may also reflect self-enhancing biases among individuals high in self-deception.

Other personality traits, such as neuroticism, also influence well-being and may interact with extraversion in complex ways.

==== Neuroticism and extraversion ====
In multiple studies, neuroticism has been shown to have an equal, if not larger, impact on happiness and subjective well-being than extraversion. One study classified school children into four categories based on their scores in assessments of extraversion and emotional stability (neuroticism). The results showed no significant difference between the happiness levels of stable introverts and stable extraverts, while unstable extraverts and introverts both demonstrated significantly less happiness than their counterparts. In this study, neuroticism appeared to be the more salient factor for overall well-being.

Likewise, in later studies, researchers used assessment scales to test for categories such as self-esteem and life-goal orientation, which they had positively correlated with happiness. Participants' responses to these scales suggested that neuroticism actually had a larger impact than extraversion in measures of well-being.

==== Other Big 5 factors and extraversion ====
Though extraversion and neuroticism seem to have the largest effect on personal happiness, other Big Five personality traits have also been shown to correlate with happiness and subjective well-being. For example, one study showed that conscientiousness and agreeableness correlated with subjective well-being with a coefficient of 0.2. While the effect of these traits was not as strong as extraversion or neuroticism, it is clear that they still have some impact on happiness outcomes.

Similarly, interactions between extraversion, neuroticism, and conscientiousness have demonstrated significant impacts on subjective well-being. In one study, researchers used three scales to assess subjective well-being. They found that extraversion only served as a predictor for one assessment, in conjunction with neuroticism, while the other two assessment outcomes were better predicted by conscientiousness and neuroticism. In addition to the importance of including other factors in happiness assessments, this study also demonstrates the manner in which an operational definition of well-being changes whether extraversion emerges as a salient predictive factor.

==== Other contributing personality factors ====
There is also evidence that other non-trait elements of personality may correlate with happiness. For instance, one study demonstrated that various features of one's goals, such as progress towards important goals or conflicts between them, can affect both emotional and cognitive well-being. Several other researchers have also suggested that, at least in more individualistic cultures, having a coherent sense of one's personality (and acting in a way that conforms to that self-concept) is positively related to well-being. Thus, focusing solely on extraversion—or even extraversion and neuroticism—is likely to provide an incomplete picture of the relationship between happiness and personality.

==== Culture ====
In addition, one's culture may also influence happiness and overall subjective well-being. The overall level of happiness fluctuates from culture to culture, as does preferred expression of happiness. Comparing various international surveys across countries reveals that different nations, and different ethnic groups within nations, exhibit differences in average life satisfaction.

For example, one researcher found that between 1958 and 1987, Japanese life satisfaction fluctuated around 6 on a 10-point scale, while Denmark's fluctuated around 8. Comparing ethnic groups within the United States, another study found that European Americans reported being "significantly happier" with their lives than Asian Americans.

Researchers have hypothesized a number of factors that could be responsible for these differences between countries, including national differences in overall income levels, self-serving biases and self-enhancement, and approach and avoidance orientations. Taken together, these findings suggest that while extraversion-introversion does have a strong correlation with happiness, it does not stand alone as a sole predictor of subjective well-being, and that other factors must be accounted for when trying to determine the correlates of happiness.

== See also ==
- Analytical psychology
- Big Five personality traits
- Introspection
- Personality test
- Reinforcement sensitivity theory
- Trait theory
