= Personality computing =

Personality computing is a research field related to artificial intelligence and personality psychology that studies personality by means of computational techniques from different sources, including text, multimedia, and social networks.

== Overview ==
Personality computing addresses three main problems involving personality: automatic personality recognition, perception, and synthesis. Automatic personality recognition is the inference of the personality type of target individuals from their digital footprint. Automatic personality perception is the inference of the personality attributed by an observer to a target individual based on some observable behavior. Automatic personality synthesis is the generation of the style or behaviour of artificial personalities in Avatars and virtual agents.

Self-assessed personality tests or observer ratings are always exploited as the ground truth for testing and validating the performance of artificial intelligence algorithms for the automatic prediction of personality types. There is a wide variety of personality tests, such as the Myers Briggs Type Indicator (MBTI) or the MMPI, but the most used are tests based on the Five Factor Model such as the Revised NEO Personality Inventory.

Personality computing can be considered as an extension or complement of Affective computing, where the former focuses on personality traits and the latter on affective states. A further extension of the two fields is Character Computing which combines various character states and traits including but not limited to personality and affect.

== History ==
Personality computing began around 2005 with the pioneering research in personality recognition by Shlomo Argamon and later by François Mairesse. These works showed that personality traits could be inferred with reasonable accuracy from text, such as blogs, self-presentations, and email addresses. In 2008, the concept of "portable personality" for the distributed management of personality profiles has been developed.

A few years later, research began in personality recognition and perception from multimodal and social signals, such as recorded meetings and voice calls.

In the 2010s, the research focused mainly on personality recognition and perception from social media, helped by the first workshops organized by Fabio Celli. In particular personality was extracted from Facebook, Twitter and Instagram. In the same years, automatic personality synthesis helped improve the coherence of simulated behavior in virtual agents.

Scientific works by Michal Kosinski demonstrated the validity of Personality Computing from different digital footprints, in particular from user preferences such as Facebook page likes, showed that machines can recognize personality better than humans and raised a warning against Cambridge Analytica and misuse of this kind of technology.

== Applications ==
Personality computing techniques, in particular personality recognition and perception, have applications in Social media marketing, where they can help reducing the cost of advertising campaigns through psychological targeting.
