= Neuroticism =

Personality trait of negativity

Neuroticism or negativity is a personality trait with disagreement on its definition, but widely understood to be associated with negative emotions. It is one of the Big Five traits. People high in neuroticism experience negative emotions like fear, anger, shame, envy, or depression more often and more intensely than those who score low on neuroticism. Highly neurotic people have more trouble coping with stressful events, are more likely to insult or lash out at others, and are more likely to interpret ordinary situations (like minor frustrations) as hopelessly difficult. Neuroticism is closely related to mood disorders such as anxiety and depression.

Individuals who score low in neuroticism tend to be more emotionally stable and less reactive to stress. They tend to be calm, even-tempered, and less likely to feel tense or rattled. Although they are low in negative emotion, they are not necessarily high in positive emotions, which are more commonly associated with extraversion and agreeableness. Neurotic extroverts, for example, would experience high levels of both positive and negative emotional states, a kind of "emotional roller coaster".

== Definition ==
Neuroticism is a trait in many models within personality theory, but there is some disagreement on its definition. It is sometimes defined as a tendency for quick arousal when stimulated and slow relaxation from arousal, especially concerning negative emotional arousal. This definition has some overlap with sensory processing sensitivity (SPS) as described by psychologist Elaine Aron, although SPS is associated with greater responsiveness both to adverse environments and supportive ones.

Another definition focuses on emotional instability, negative emotionality, or maladjustment as opposed to emotional stability or good adjustment. It has also been defined in terms of reduced self-control and impaired ability to manage psychological stress. This aligns with the conceptualization offered by Barlow and colleagues, where neuroticism is understood as a trait with genetic, neurobiological, and environmental roots. In this framework, neuroticism is marked by stress-specific reactivity as well as beliefs that the world is an unsafe or unpredictable place and difficult to cope with.

Various personality tests produce numerical scores, and these scores are mapped onto the concept of "neuroticism" in various ways, which has created some confusion in the scientific literature, especially with regard to sub-traits or "facets".

== Measurement ==
Like other personality traits, neuroticism is typically viewed as a continuous dimension rather than a discrete state.

The extent of neuroticism is generally assessed using self-report measures, although peer-reports and third-party observation can also be used. Self-report measures are either lexical or based on statements. Deciding which measure of either type to use in research is determined by an assessment of psychometric properties and the time and space constraints of the study being undertaken.

Lexical measures use individual adjectives that reflect neurotic traits, such as anxiety, envy, jealousy, and moodiness, and are very space and time efficient for research purposes. Lewis Goldberg (1992) developed a 20-word measure as part of his 100-word Big Five markers. Saucier (1994) developed a briefer 8-word measure as part of his 40-word mini-markers. Thompson (2008) systematically revised these measures to develop the International English Mini-Markers which has superior validity and reliability in populations both within and outside North America. Internal consistency reliability of the International English Mini-Markers for the Neuroticism (emotional stability) measure for native English-speakers is reported as 0.84, and that for non-native English-speakers is 0.77.

Statement measures tend to comprise more words, and hence consume more research instrument space, than lexical measures. Respondents are asked the extent to which they, for example, "Remain calm under pressure", or "Have frequent mood swings". While some statement-based measures of neuroticism have similarly acceptable psychometric properties in North American populations to lexical measures, their generally emic development makes them less suited to use in other populations. For instance, statements in colloquial North American English like "feeling blue" or "being down in the dumps" are sometimes hard for non-native English-speakers to understand.

Neuroticism has also been studied from the perspective of Gray's biopsychological theory of personality, using a scale that measures personality along two dimensions: the behavioural inhibition system (BIS) and the behavioural activation system (BAS). The BIS is thought to be related to sensitivity to punishment as well as avoidance motivation, while the BAS is thought to be related to sensitivity to reward as well as approach motivation. Neuroticism has been found to be positively correlated with the BIS scale, and negatively correlated with the BAS scale.

Neuroticism has been included as one of the four dimensions that comprise core self-evaluations, one's fundamental appraisal of oneself, along with locus of control, self-efficacy, and self-esteem. The concept of core self-evaluations was first examined by Judge, Locke, and Durham (1997), and since then evidence has been found to suggest these have the ability to predict several work outcomes, specifically, job satisfaction and job performance.

There is a risk of selection bias in surveys of neuroticism; a 2012 review of N-scores said that "many studies used samples drawn from privileged and educated populations".

Neuroticism is highly correlated with the startle reflex in response to fearful conditions and inversely correlated with it in response to disgusting or repulsive stimuli. This suggests that Neuroticism may increase vigilance where evasive action is possible but promote emotional blunting when escape is not an option. A measure of the startle reflex can be used to predict the trait neuroticism with good accuracy; a fact that is thought by some to underlie the neurological basis of the trait. The startle reflex is a reflex in response to a loud noise that one typically has no control over, though anticipation can reduce the effect. The strength of the reflex as well as the time until the reflex ceases can be used to predict both neuroticism and extraversion.

== Mental disorder correlations ==
Questions used in many neuroticism scales overlap with instruments used to assess mental disorders like anxiety disorders (especially social anxiety disorder) and mood disorders (especially major depressive disorder), which can sometimes confound efforts to interpret N scores and makes it difficult to determine whether each of neuroticism and the overlapping mental disorders might cause the other, or if both might stem from other causes. Correlations can be identified.

A 2013 meta-analysis found that a wide range of clinical mental disorders are associated with elevated levels of neuroticism compared to levels in the general population. It found that high neuroticism is predictive for the development of anxiety disorders, major depressive disorder, psychosis, and schizophrenia, and is predictive but less so for substance use and non-specific mental distress. These associations are smaller after adjustment for elevated baseline symptoms of the mental illnesses and psychiatric history.

The five big studies have described children and adolescents with high neuroticism as "anxious, vulnerable, tense, easily frightened, 'falling apart' under stress, guilt-prone, moody, low in frustration tolerance, and insecure in relationships with others", which includes both traits concerning the prevalence of negative emotions as well as the response to these negative emotions. Neuroticism in adults similarly was found to be associated with the frequency of self-reported problems.

These associations can vary with culture: for example, Adams found that among upper-middle-class American teenaged girls, neuroticism was associated with eating disorders and self-harm, but among Ghanaian teenaged girls, higher neuroticism was associated with magical thinking and extreme fear of enemies.

Recent research further support the process linking neuroticism to internalizing psychopathology. Individuals with higher levels of neuroticism are more likely to engage in repetitive negative thinking and exhibit greater anxiety sensitivity, both of which increase vulnerability to anxiety and depressive disorders. These findings suggest that the relationship between neuroticism and psychopathology is influenced not only by emotional instability itself but also by cognitive processes linked to psychological distress.

=== Mood disorders ===
Disorders associated with elevated neuroticism include mood disorders, such as depression and bipolar disorder. Mood disorders tend to have a much larger association with neuroticism than most other disorders.

=== Personality disorders ===
A 2004 meta-analysis attempted to analyze personality disorders in light of the five-factor personality theory and found that elevated neuroticism is correlated with many personality disorders.

== Theories of causation ==
=== Mental-noise hypothesis ===
Studies have found that the mean reaction times will not differ between individuals high in neuroticism and those low in neuroticism, but that, with individuals high in neuroticism, there is considerably more trial-to-trial variability in performance reflected in reaction time standard deviations. In other words, on some trials neurotic individuals are faster than average, and on others they are slower than average. It has been suggested that this variability reflects noise in the individual's information processing systems or instability of basic cognitive operations (such as regulation processes), and further that this noise originates from two sources: mental preoccupations and reactivity processes.

Flehmig et al. (2007) studied mental noise in terms of everyday behaviours using the Cognitive Failures Questionnaire, which is a self-report measure of the frequency of slips and lapses of attention. A "slip" is an error by commission, and a "lapse" is an error by omission. This scale was correlated with two well-known measures of neuroticism, the BIS/BAS scale and the Eysenck Personality Questionnaire. Results indicated that the CFQ-UA (Cognitive Failures Questionnaire- Unintended Activation) subscale was most strongly correlated with neuroticism (r = .40) and explained the most variance (16%) compared to overall CFQ scores, which only explained 7%. The authors interpret these findings as suggesting that mental noise is "highly specific in nature" as it is related most strongly to attention slips triggered endogenously by associative memory. In other words, this may suggest that mental noise is mostly task-irrelevant cognitions such as worries and preoccupations.

=== Evolutionary psychology ===
The theory of evolution may also explain differences in personality. For example, one of the evolutionary approaches to depression focuses on neuroticism and finds that heightened reactivity to negative outcomes may have had a survival benefit, and that furthermore a positive relationship has been found between neuroticism level and success in university with the precondition that the negative effects of neuroticism are also successfully coped with. Likewise, a heightened reactivity to positive events may have had reproductive advantages, selecting for heightened reactivity generally. Nettle contends that evolution selected for higher levels of neuroticism until the negative effects of neuroticism outweighed its benefits, resulting in selection for a certain optimal level of neuroticism. This type of selection will result in a normal distribution of neuroticism, so the extremities of the distribution will be individuals with excessive neuroticism or too low neuroticism for what is optimal, and the ones with excessive neuroticism would therefore be more vulnerable to the negative effects of depression, and Nettle gives this as the explanation for the existence of depression rather than hypothesizing, as others have, that depression itself has any evolutionary benefit.

Some research has found that neuroticism, in modern societies, is positively correlated with reproductive success in females but not in males. A possible explanation may be that neuroticism in females comes at the expense of formal education (which is correlated with lower fertility) and correlates with unplanned and adolescent pregnancies.

=== Terror management theory ===
According to terror management theory (TMT) neuroticism is primarily caused by insufficient anxiety buffers against unconscious death anxiety. These buffers consist of:

1. Cultural worldviews that impart life with a sense of enduring meaning, such as social continuity beyond one's death, future legacy and afterlife beliefs.
2. A sense of personal value, or the self-esteem in the cultural worldview context, an enduring sense of meaning.

While TMT agrees with standard evolutionary psychology accounts that the roots of neuroticism in Homo sapiens or its ancestors are likely in adaptive sensitivities to negative outcomes, it posits that once Homo sapiens achieved a higher level of self-awareness, neuroticism increased enormously, becoming largely a spandrel, a non-adaptive byproduct of our adaptive intelligence, which resulted in a crippling awareness of death that threatened to undermine other adaptive functions. This overblown anxiety thus needed to be buffered via intelligently creative, but largely fictitious and arbitrary notions of cultural meaning and personal value. Since highly religious or supernatural conceptions of the world provide "cosmic" personal significance and literal immortality, they are deemed to offer the most efficient buffers against death anxiety and neuroticism. Thus, historically, the shift to more materialistic and secular cultures—starting in the Neolithic, and culminating in the Industrial Revolution—is deemed to have increased neuroticism.

=== Genetic and environmental factors ===
A 2013 review found that "Neuroticism is the product of the interplay between genetic and environmental influences. Heritability estimates typically range from 40% to 60%." The effect size of these genetic differences remain largely the same throughout development, but the hunt for any specific genes that control neuroticism levels has "turned out to be difficult and hardly successful so far." On the other hand, with regards to environmental influences, adversities during development such as "emotional neglect and sexual abuse" were found to be positively associated with neuroticism. However, "sustained change in neuroticism and mental health are rather rare or have only small effects."

In the July 1951 article: "The Inheritance of Neuroticism" by Hans J. Eysenck and Donald Prell it was reported that some 80 per cent of individual differences in neuroticism are due to heredity and only 20 percent are due to environment....the factor of neuroticism is not a statistical artifact, but constitutes a biological unit which is inherited as a whole....neurotic predisposition is to a large extent hereditarily determined.

In children and adolescents, psychologists speak of temperamental negative affectivity that, during adolescence, develops into the neuroticism personality domain. Mean neuroticism levels change throughout the lifespan as a function of personality maturation and social roles, but also the expression of new genes. Neuroticism in particular was found to decrease as a result of maturity by decreasing through age 40 and then leveling off. Generally speaking, the influence of environments on neuroticism increases over the lifespan, although people probably select and evoke experiences based on their neuroticism levels.

The emergent field of "imaging genetics", which investigates the role of genetic variation in the structure and function of the brain, has studied certain genes suggested to be related to neuroticism, and the one studied so far concerning this topic has been the serotonin transporter-linked promoter region gene known as 5-HTTLPR, which is transcribed into a serotonin transporter that removes serotonin. It has been found that compared to the long (l) variant of 5-HTTLPR, the short (s) variant has reduced promoter activity, and the first study on this subject has shown that the presence of the s-variant 5-HTTLPR has been found to result in higher amygdala activity from seeing angry or fearful faces while doing a non-emotional task, with further studies confirming that the s-variant 5-HTTLPR result greater amygdala activity in response to negative stimuli, but there have also been null findings. A meta-analysis of 14 studies has shown that this gene has a moderate effect size and accounts for 10% of the phenotypic difference. However, the relationship between brain activity and genetics may not be completely straightforward due to other factors, with suggestions made that cognitive control and stress may moderate the effect of the gene. There are two models that have been proposed to explain the type of association between the 5-HTTLPR gene and amygdala activity: the "phasic activation" model proposes that the gene controls amygdala activity levels in response to stress, whereas the "tonic activation" model, on the other hand, proposes that the gene controls baseline amygdala activity. Another gene that has been suggested for further study to be related to neuroticism is the catechol-O-methyltransferase (COMT) gene.

The anxiety and maladaptive stress responses that are aspects of neuroticism have been the subject of intensive study. Dysregulation of hypothalamic–pituitary–adrenal axis and glucocorticoid system, and influence of different versions of the serotonin transporter and 5-HT1A receptor genes may influence the development of neuroticism in combination with environmental effects like the quality of upbringing.

Neuroimaging studies with fMRI have had mixed results, with some finding that increased activity in the amygdala and anterior cingulate cortex, brain regions associated with arousal, is correlated with high neuroticism scores, as is activation of the associations have also been found with the medial prefrontal cortex, insular cortex, and hippocampus, while other studies have found no correlations. Further studies have been conducted trying to tighten experimental design by using genetics to add additional differentiation among participants, as well as twin study models.

Recent fMRI research has showed that individuals who possess higher neuroticism scores exhibited greater neural activation when viewing negative emotional images, this can suggest that neuroticism is associated with increased sensitivity to negative emotional stimuli. When compared to individuals who viewed positive emotional images, researchers found that higher levels of extraversion demonstrated stronger neural responses, further proving that personality traits can influence emotional processing in the brain. Additional research conducted to understanding neuroimaging examined how neuroticism influences functional brain connectivity during emotionally negative social experiences. Individuals with higher neuroticism displayed altered functional brain connectivity between brain regions that are involved with supporting emotional regulation, while processing critical feedback, indicating an increased sensitivity to socially negative experiences.

A related trait, behavioral inhibition, or "inhibition to the unfamiliar", has received attention as the trait concerning withdrawal or fear from unfamiliar situations, which is generally measured through observation of child behavior in response to, for example, encountering unfamiliar individuals. This trait in particular has been hypothesized to be related to amygdala function, but the evidence so far has been mixed.

== Epidemiology ==
A research over large samples has shown that levels of neuroticism are higher in women than men. Neuroticism is also found to decrease slightly with age. The same study noted that no functional MRI studies have yet been performed to investigate these differences, calling for more research. A 2010 review found personality differences between genders to be between "small and moderate", the largest of those differences being in the traits of agreeableness and neuroticism. Many personality traits were found to have had larger personality differences between men and women in developed countries compared to less developed countries, and differences in three traits—extraversion, neuroticism, and people-versus-thing orientation—showed differences that remained consistent across different levels of economic development, which is also consistent with the "possible influence of biologic factors." Three cross-cultural studies have revealed higher levels of female neuroticism across almost all nations.

A 2016 review investigated the geographic issue; it found that in US, neuroticism is highest in the mid-Atlantic states and southwards but declines westward, while openness to experience is highest in ethnically diverse regions of the mid-Atlantic, New England, the West Coast, and cities. Likewise, in the UK neuroticism is lowest in urban areas. Generally, geographical studies find correlations between low neuroticism and entrepreneurship and economic vitality and correlations between high neuroticism and poor health outcomes. The review found that the causal relationship between regional cultural and economic conditions and psychological health is unclear.

A 2013 review found that a high level of neuroticism in young adults is a risk factor for triggering mood disorders. Neuroticism is also a possible risk factor for developing an addiction disorder to internet. Investigation of the Instagram users showed the preference of cosmetic products and intolerance of weapons among highly neurotic users.

Neuroticism has also been found to be associated with older age. In 2007, Mroczek and Spiro found that among older men, upward trends in neuroticism over life as well as increased neuroticism overall both contributed to higher mortality rates.

There is a strong correlation between bruxism and neuroticism. More severe bruxism is associated with a higher degree of neuroticism. Cross-temporal analyses have shown that average levels of anxiety and neuroticism across successive birth cohorts.Researchers identified that broader societal changes, including increased environmental stressors and reduced social connections, which can contribute to these long-term issues, even when environmental and cultural factors are involved.

=== China ===
According to a 2021 analysis by Princeton University academic Rory Truex of survey results, those discontented with the Chinese Communist Party typically showed high neuroticism, while CCP members and supporters showed the opposite.

=== Russia ===
According to a 2017 research, higher neuroticism in Russia is correlated with lower support for President Vladimir Putin.

== Maladaptive (risky) behaviors ==
When neuroticism is described as a personality trait that measures emotional stability, research has indicated that it is also involved in maladaptive behaviors to regulate an individual's emotions. High levels of neuroticism in an individual are associated with anxiety and overthinking, as well as irritability and impulsiveness. Studies have shown that individuals with higher levels of neuroticism are associated with a shortened life span, a greater likelihood of divorce, and a lack of education. To cope with the negative emotionality, these individuals may engage in maladaptive forms of coping, such as procrastination, substance abuse, etc. With these internal pressures, due to these negative emotions, neuroticism often relates to difficulties with emotion regulation, leading to engagement in divergent (risky) behaviors.

Due to the facets associated with neuroticism, it can be viewed as a negative personality trait. A common perception of the personality trait most closely associated with risky behaviors is extraversion, due to the correlated adjectives such as adventurous, enthusiastic, and outgoing. These adjectives allow the individual to feel the positive emotions associated with risk-taking. However, neuroticism can also be a contributing factor, just for different reasons. As anxiety is one of the facets of neuroticism, it can lead to indulgence in anxiety-based maladaptive and risky behaviors. Neuroticism is considerably stable over time, and research has shown that individuals with higher levels of neuroticism may prefer short-term solutions, such as risky behaviors, and neglect the long-term costs.

This is relevant to neuroticism because it is also associated with impulsivity. One of the distinct traits of impulsivity is called urgency, which is a predisposition to experiencing strong impulses that can lead to impulsive behavior, while dealing with the negative emotions attached. Urgency can be both negative and positive; positive urgency deals with positive emotions and the contrast for negative urgency. Despite the negative emotions that are prominent in neuroticism, research indicates that it is combination of the negative emotions present, together with the positive emotions that are generated by the engagement in maladaptive behaviors.

=== Interventions ===
Although neuroticism was traditionally considered to be a relatively stable personality trait, recent research has increasingly examined interventions designed to reduce neuroticism. A systematic review of intervention studies published between 1998 and 2023 found that most interventions reported positive reductions in neuroticism following treatment. However, researchers also noted considerable variation in participant characteristics, intervention methods, and study designs, suggesting that additional research is needed to determine which approaches produce the most consistent long-term improvements.

== See also ==
- Cognitive vulnerability
- Highly sensitive person
- Illusion of control
- Negative affect
- Neurotics Anonymous
- Neurotic Personality Questionnaire KON-2006
- Personality psychology
- Psychoticism
