= Vladimir Rusalov =

Russian psychologist and anthropologist (1939–2023)

- Владимир Русалов
- Born: Vladimir Mikhailovich Rusalov; 5 October 1939; Kizlyar, Dagestan ASSR, Russian SFSR, USSR
- Died: 17 January 2023 (aged 83)
- Citizenship: Russian
- Education: Lomonosov Moscow State University
- Known for: Structure of Temperament Questionnaire
- Scientific career
- Fields: Psychology, psychophysiology, temperament, individual differences, psychometrics
- Workplaces: Institute of Psychology, Russian Academy of Sciences
- Doctoral advisors: Alexander Luria, Vladimir Nebylitsyn

Vladimir Mikhailovich Rusalov (Russian: Владимир Михайлович Русалов; 5 October 1939 – 17 January 2023) was a Russian psychologist and anthropologist who was the first to develop a temperament model within the activity-specific approach. He was best known for his work in psychology of personality, temperament and differential psychophysiology.

== Biography ==
Rusalov was born in Kizlyar (Dagestan, Russia). In 1963 he graduated from the Department of Biology (specialty of Anthropology) Lomonosov Moscow State University. In 1963-1972 he was working as a junior and then senior researcher in Institute of Psychology, Russian Academy of Pedagogical Sciences under the supervision of Boris Teplov and Vladimir Nebylitsyn. His background in anthropology and interest in individual differences attracted attention of neuropsychologist Alexander Luria who became Rusalov's Ph.D. supervisor. The title of his Ph.D. was "Human constitution and absolute thresholds within the nervous system", a degree was received in 1967 from this Institute of Psychology. During his Ph.D. program he met and collaborated with Jan Strelau, who was also a Ph.D. student in Vladimir Nebylitsyn laboratory at that time.

From 1972 he worked as a scientist in the Institute of Psychology under Russian Academy of Sciences. From 1972 to 2004 he was a Head of the Laboratory of Differential Psychophysiology (renamed later as Nebylitsyn laboratory of individuality). In 1982 he received a full Doctorate degree for his work "Biological basis of psychological individual differences". This work included a comparison of the EEG recordings and performance on various tasks of individuals with different endurance, tempo, plasticity and emotionality. In 2004-2009 he was working as a Leading Researcher in Nebylitsyn's Laboratory of Individuality. From 2009 he worked as a Leading Researcher in Drujinin Laboratory of Abilities and Mental Resources, Institute of Psychology under Russian Academy of Sciences. He also carried a status of professor teaching psychology in Moscow universities and colleges from 1992. He was also an invited professor in several American universities.

Rusalov died on 17 January 2023, at the age of 83.

== Scientific contribution: first activity-specific model of temperament ==
Rusalov worked in the field of psychophysiology, psycho diagnostics, personality psychology and differential psychology for over 40 years. His Ph.D. program was based on Luria's interest in neurophysiological bases of individual differences and on the experimental approach of Teplov and Vladimir Nebylitsyn who continued Pavlov's studies of the typology of nervous systems.

In his own studies Rusalov recorded EEGs and measured evoked potentials, absolute thresholds in visual, auditory, and tactile modalities, strength of excitation in auditory and visual modalities, mobility in auditory and visual modalities, problem-solving in deterministic and probabilistic conditions, the speed of problem solving using a variety of tests on intelligence, time spent attempting unsolvable problems and the number of times that a subject gave up while attempting to solve a task.

From these experiments Rusalov concluded that temperamental traits are activity-specific: the energetic level or tempo of performance might be different for the same individual in physical, social or intellectual activities, therefore, the aspects of the performance of these activities should be assessed and analyzed separately. Rusalov suggested that temperament traits be assessed using four scales:

- (1) ergonicity (endurance, ability for prolonged work),
- (2) plasticity,
- (3) tempo of activity, and
- (4) emotionality,

each evaluated separately in three areas of activity: social, physical and intellectual. Mental (intellectual) activities are considered to be those which involve the greatest degree of probabilistic behavior and which require conscious attention. This 4 (traits) x 3 (types of activities) model of temperament was the first model within the activity-specific approach.

Based on this model, Rusalov developed the Structure of Temperament Questionnaire (STQ). The first version of the English version of the STQ came out in 1989 and had in total 8 scales: four scales Ergonicity (endurance, the ability to keep intensive work), Plasticity (or flexibility, the ability to effectively switch between tasks or to change the way of performance), Tempo, and Emotionality assessed in two types of aspects of activity, physical-motor (Motor) and social-verbal (such as reading, writing, speaking, communication). Then an Extended version of the STQ was offered (1997) that included a third set of four scales to measure aspects of intellectual activity. His initial and extended versions of Structure of Temperament Questionnaire became the most widely used in Russian Psychology in the practice of personnel selection, personality studies, educational psychology and clinical psychology in the past 40 years.

The benefits and novelty of the activity-specific approach developed by Rusalov were that it offered a differentiation between traits that was missed in previous models of temperament and personality. This approach, i.e. differentiation between physical, verbal and mental aspects of activities was used in the neurochemical model of Functional Ensemble of Temperament developed by Irina Trofimova in 2007–2014.

Another benefit and novelty of the activity-specific approach was that it integrated the principle of habit formation in behavioural regulation into the structure of psychological individual differences. Other models of personality and temperament did not differentiate between traits related to probabilistic and deterministic aspects of behavioural regulation. Meanwhile, it is well known in neuroscience that behaviour in complex, probabilistic and novel situations is regulated by different (neocortex) systems than behaviour in learned or simple situations (regulated more by basal ganglia). Rusalov demonstrated that this distinction is applicable to the structure of temperament. For example, when it comes to Endurance, Intellectual Endurance relates to capacities for prolonged mental activities whereas Physical (Motor) Endurance in his model relates to capacities for stereotypical, well-learned physical work. Similarly, the trait of Plasticity in Rusalov's model relates to activation of the frontal cortex controlling the ease of integration of new programs of actions whereas the trait of Tempo relates to the speed of integration of previously learned or simple actions.

Neurophysiological (cortical) systems regulating probabilistic aspects of actions gradually pass control to the "habit" systems (in basal ganglia) when an individual learns the action or already has sufficient familiarity with the program of actions.

Traits identified by the STQ were found to have strong genetic component. Specific temperament profile as measured by Rusalov's model was also linked to creativity and psychiatric disorders.
