= Activity-specific approach in temperament research =

Theory related to the structure of temperament

Activity-specific approach in temperament research is the theory related to a structure of temperament, i.e. how temperament traits can be classified and organized. This approach suggests:

- 1) a separation of the traits related to three aspects of activities: social-verbal, motor-physical and mental aspects of behaviour. In contrast to that, all other models of a structure of temperament describing an energetic dimension (for example, traits of Activity or Extraversion) do not differentiate between the traits regulating physical, social-verbal or mental activities. Yet, someone who enjoys performing prolonged and/or intense physical work might tire of social conversations very quickly. Likewise, a fast-talking person might not necessarily be able to manipulate objects swiftly or perform rapid mental calculations.
- 2) an integration of the principle of habit formation in behavioural regulation into the structure of psychological individual differences (the principle was studied experimentally since the pioneering work of Nikolai Bernstein. Bernstein's studies in kinesiology and subsequent studies in neuroscience demonstrated that there is a transfer of control over construction of behaviour between several areas of the brain, depending on novelty and complexity of the tasks. Neurophysiological (cortical) systems regulating probabilistic aspects of actions gradually pass control to the "habit" systems (in basal ganglia when an individual learns the action or already has sufficient familiarity with the program of actions. The activity-specific approach differentiates between temperament traits related to several levels of complexity of behaviour. Other models of personality and temperament did not differentiate between traits related to probabilistic and deterministic aspects of behavioural regulation. Meanwhile, it is well-known in neuroscience that behaviour in complex, probabilistic and novel situations is regulated by different (neocortex) systems than behaviour in well-learned or in simple situations (regulated more by basal ganglia). Rusalov demonstrated that this distinction is applicable to the structure of temperament. For example, when it comes to Endurance, Intellectual Endurance relates to capacities for prolonged mental activities whereas Physical (Motor) Endurance in his model relates to capacities for stereotypical, well-learned physical work. Similarly, the trait of Plasticity in Rusalov's model relates to activation of the frontal cortex controlling the ease of integration of new programs of actions whereas the trait of Tempo relates to the speed of integration of previously learned or simple actions.

== History ==
The approach was developed within experimental psychophysiology in studies on adults only and therefore was not used in developmental psychology (in studies and practical applications of children's temperament).

First known expression of this idea was in the work of Dodge, who studied mental fatigue. Dodge suggested that physical and mental efforts are regulated by different nervous processes.

This idea was verbalized again by Vladimir Nebylitsyn, then further developed in differential psychology and psychophysiology experiments from the late 1970s by Rusalov, who was working in Nebylitsyn's laboratory and inherited this laboratory after a sudden tragic death of Nebylitsyn). Rusalov proposed activity-specific theory of temperament, which was further developed by his graduate student Trofimova in her Compact version of the Structure of Temperament Questionnaire.

The idea of the structure of temperament separating the traits related to social-verbal, motor-physical and mental aspects of behavior was incorporated by Trofimova in the neurochemical model Functional Ensemble of Temperament that links the relationships between monoamine neurotransmitters, neuropeptides and hormonal systems to the 12 temperament traits.

== Models of temperament within the activity-specific approach ==
=== Rusalov's (STQ-150) (electro-physiological) model ===
Vladimir Rusalov, who continued the line in research in the Laboratory of Differential Psychophysiology (Institute of Psychology of Russian Academy of Sciences) started by Nebylitsyn and Teplov, recorded EEGs and measured evoked potential, absolute threshold in visual, auditory, and tactile modalities, strength of excitation and mobility in auditory and visual modalities, problem solving in deterministic and probabilistic conditions, endurance in solving the tasks, and the speed of solving a variety of tests. Rusalov concluded that temperament traits are activity-specific, i.e. traits regulating physical, social-verbal and intellectual aspects of behaviour are based on different neurophysiological systems. He showed that an energetic level or tempo of performance might differ for the same individual when he/she is solving three different types of tasks (physical, verbal or intellectual. Rusalov suggested, therefore, that individual differences in these three types of activities should be assessed and analyzed using separate scales.

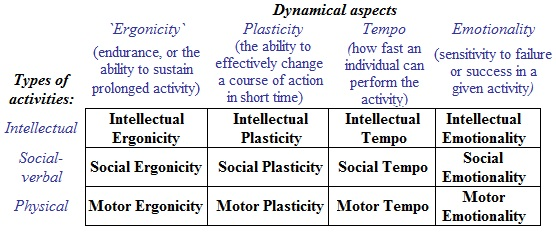
Rusalov's activity-specific model of the structure of temperament

Rusalov's model suggests that the structure of temperament can be presented as 12 traits: 4 aspects of behaviour (ergonicity (endurance), plasticity, tempo and emotionality), which are grouped by three aspects of behavior: motor-physical, social-verbal and intellectual. This model was incorporated in the extended Structure of Temperament Questionnaire. The factor analysis of the data received on Russian, Australian, American, Canadian, Urdu-Canadian, Polish-Canadian and Chinese samples confirmed a separation between the factors related to these three aspects of behavior.

=== Compact STQ-77 (neuro-chemical) model ===
Trofimova, who was doing her PhD in Rusalov's lab in the early 1990s suggested that the trait of impulsivity reflects the speed of initiation of immature (emotionality-based) behavioural response, whereas tempo and plasticity relate to the speed of more integrated behavioural response. She suggested therefore that all three traits relate to the speed of an integration of an action. Her alternative activity-specific model of temperament included Empathy and Sensation seeking as orientation-related traits and also suggested a re-arrangement of Emotionality traits. The STQ-77 model is therefore based on Rusalov's model and also on Luria's theory related to three neuroanatomic systems (sensory-informational, programming and energetic) regulating human behavior. This model first appeared as an architecture of the Compact version of the Structure of Temperament Questionnaire (STQ-77) in 2007. The factor analysis of the STQ-77 data received on Russian and Canadian samples confirmed a separation between the factors related to motor-physical, social-verbal and mental aspects of behaviour.

Subsequently Trofimova reviewed studies in neurophysiology, neurochemistry, clinical psychology and kinesiology and linked functionality of neurotransmitters to the 12 traits of the STQ-77 model in a framework of a neurochemical model Functional Ensemble of Temperament

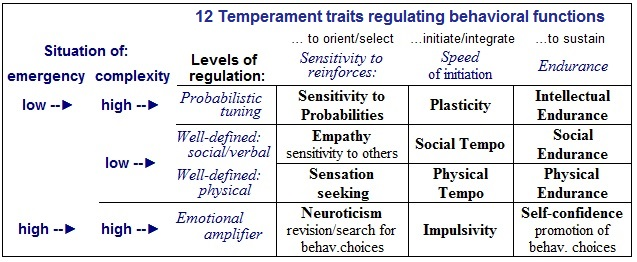
Trofimova's model of the structure of temperament ("Functional Ensemble of Temperament")

The differences between Rusalov's and Trofimova's models are:

- the choice of a grouping of temperament traits by dynamical aspects (endurance, speed of integration and orientation), presented as three columns in the Figure;
- a presence of orientation-related traits in Trofimova's model which were not included in Rusalov's model. These traits describe the behavioural orientation of a person with preferences to specific types of reinforcers: sensations (Sensation Seeking), other people's state (Empathy) or knowledge about causes of natural processes (a trait named as Sensitivity to Probabilities).
- a different structure of the traits related to emotionality. FET considers emotionality traits as systems amplifying three dynamical aspects of behaviour presented in the three columns of the model. Amplification of orientation aspects emerges in the trait of Neuroticism; amplification of speed of integration (i.e. immature integration) emerges as Impulsivity and amplification of subjective feeling of energetic capacities emerges in the trait of Self-confidence.

Both models differentiate between physical and verbal-social aspects of well-determined activities (2 middle rows, 6 traits), and consider the traits related to the mental, intellectual aspects of activities (3 top traits of the FET model) as traits regulating behaviour in probabilistic, complex situations. Such differentiation is in line with the neuroanatomic localization of control over motor coordination (via parietal cortex), verbal functions (via left temporal cortex) and mental functions (via frontal cortex).

== Comparison to other models of temperament ==
Previous models of a structure of temperament did not distinguish among the traits regulating behaviour in different areas of activity. They consider, for example, energetic capacities in motor and social activities (extraversion or Strength of the nervous system) as based on a nonspecific general arousal of the nervous system. Many models of temperament and personality follow a so-called "general arousal" approach, considering only one general trait related to the energetic component of behaviour: "strength of excitation" (Pavlov, Jan Strelau) "liveliness", "vigilance" (Cattell), extraversion (Eysenck, Five-Factor model in personality), "activity" (Heymans, Buss & Plomin, 1984; Rothbart, et al., 2000), approach behavioural system (Gray), drive persistence (Telegen, 1985) or just "arousal""(Mehrabian, 1996). However, it appears "obvious" that a person who, for example, exhibits ability for long and intense communication is not necessarily able to sustain long and intense physical or mental work.

Moreover, early temperament models (offered by Pavlov, Eysenck, Gray) were originally developed through animal studies under relatively deterministic conditions using insensitive statistical methods that could not explain individual differences in complex probabilistic human behavior. These models therefore missed the social and mental specifics of human activities. The activity-specific approach suggested that the separate regulation of mental and physical activities within the nervous system should be reflected in a separation of traits related to different aspects of behaviour. This meant that animal models of temperament should be upgraded with the traits related to specifics of human activities.

Yet, here is an overlap of the temperament traits described within the Activity-specific and alternative models of temperament:

- Temperament traits of the FET model reflecting three formal-dynamical aspects of behaviour (energetic, dynamic/speed of integration, and orientational) are in line with the separation between energetic and mobility traits of temperament in experiments of the Pavlovian tradition (Pavlov, Teplov & Nebylitsyn, Rusalov, Strelau).
- Regulatory traits of directionality/orientation described by the FET model are line with Jung's theory of Introversion and Extraversion. This theory describes first type as sensitivity, behavioural orientation to internal thinking (an analog of FET trait of Sensitivity to Probabilities) whereas the second Jungian type describes orientation to socialization with other people, or social type of sensitivity. FET model borrowed the idea about a biologically-based trait of Sensation seeking from Zuckerman`s concept of Sensation seeking (1994). The analogs of the temperament traits of Empathy and Sensation Seeking within the STQ-77/FET model were described by Eysenck and Eysenck (1985) as "toughmindedness" and "non-conformity" (facets of the Psychoticism factor); Cloninger (et al., 1994) ("novelty seeking"); S. Eysenck (1985) ("venturesomeness" and "empathy"), Taylor and Morrison (1992) ("sympathetic-indifferent", "responsive-inhibited", "subjective-objective"), Rothbart, Ahadi, and Evans (2000) ("orienting sensitivity"), and Baron-Cohen (2003) ("systemizing" and "empathizing").
- Similar to the FET model, several other temperament models included traits related to social activities that were separated from those related to physical (general) activities. The second version of Eysenck's Extraversion scale of the EPI separated Sociability (as the energetic component of social activities) and Impulsivity items. In 1985, Eysenck and Eysenck upgraded their 2-factor model (extraversion and neuroticism), adding Psychoticism as a temperamental trait describing issues of compliance with social expectations. This model was again upgraded to the Eysenck Personality Profiler (EPP), which had 21 sub-traits grouped into the 3 initial Eysenck factors (1995). Buss and Plomin's temperament study with infants was based on the EAS model, which included Activity and Sociability as separate factors (Buss & Plomin, 1984), and the same separation was offered in Zuckerman (2002) 5-factor model. Mehrabian (1996) offered a three-dimensional temperament model, which in addition to the two basic dimensions of "Arousal" and "Pleasure-Displeasure" (emotionality) had a dimension describing social behaviour as "Dominance-Submissiveness". Similar dimensions (Social activity and Dominance-Submissiveness) were used by Taylor and Morrison (1992).
- temperament traits regulating behaviour at two levels of situational emergency, associated with different degree of emotional response are classically described as two groups: Emotionality and Activity/Energy. Combination of two extremes in these two basic dimensions were used to explain Hippocrates-Galen' four classic temperament types since the end of the 18th century, in the work of Kant, Heymans, Wundt, Stern, Pavlov, Adler, Stranger, Lasursky, Kretschmer and Sheldon. After the functions of the ARAS and limbic systems were linked to physical and emotional arousal, Eysenck named this golden pair as 'Extraversion' and 'Neuroticism', followed by Thayer, Watson and Tellegen and the Big Five model of personality. Two emotional dispositions, Neuroticism and Self-Confidence were described from the 1970-80s in a number of Approach/Withdrawal (A/W) models (Akiskal, Gray, Simonov, Thomas & Chess, Windle & Lerner).

Similarly to this approach, other models also described at least three levels of control. For example, Ortony, Norman, and Revelle differentiated between "reactive" (by analogy with Emotionality traits), "routine" (by analogy with "deterministic", or well-learned traits) and "reflective" (by analogy with "contextual", or "probabilistic" traits) levels of behavioural regulation.

== Critiques and upgrades ==
The benefits of activity-specific approach of Rusalov's model of temperament do not mean, however, that this model is complete. Several factor analytic studies of the STQ consistently showed that the three Emotionality scales of the STQ (Motor Emotionality, Social Emotionality and Intellectual Emotionality) were not as activity-specific as the Ergonicity (endurance), Plasticity and Tempo scales and basically constituted one factor

Trofimova suggested that Rusalov's 12-trait temperament model can be re-worked into another 12-trait temperament model that unifies the former Rusalov's three traits of Emotionality in one dimension of neuroticism. Moreover, Trofimova pointed out that intellectual activity uses analytic differentiation of contextual information whereas a tempo of activity uses more explicit, readily available and well-defined behavioural elements. For this reason, the scale of Intellectual Tempo within Rusalov's model might reflect a tempo of pre-learned cognitive elements but not an analytic activity. Trofimova suggested that only the scales of only Motor and Social-verbal Tempo (but Intellectual Tempo) should stay in the model whereas the speed of generation of less-defined behavioural integration should be called Plasticity. By the same logic, Motor and Social Plasticity represent manipulation of well-defined behavioural elements and these traits describe therefore tempo- and not plasticity-related aspects. For this reason Trofimova suggested to consider only one and not three types of Plasticity and two types of Tempo. Rusalov's model was also missing the scales of Impulsivity, Self-Confidence, sensation seeking, and empathy – but these scales were added in the STQ-77 and the Functional Ensemble of Temperament model.

== Applications ==
Activity-specific approach in temperament was employed in:

- organizational psychology in vocational assessments related to recommended placement of staff and fitness for various jobs.
- clinical psychology as a framework for new versions of DSM or ICD. Clinical studies conducted the FET/STQ-77 models showed that the activity-specific model of temperament matches the structure of symptoms of mental disorders described in main classifications much better than other temperament models, and is capable of differentiating between anxiety and depression
- differential psychology and general psychological assessment of most consistent, biologically based traits.
