= Structure of Temperament Questionnaire =

Test to measure behavioural traits

Structure of Temperament Questionnaire (STQ) is a test to measure 12 temperament traits, i.e. consistent, biologically and neurochemically based individual differences in behaviour.

== Purpose and format ==
The Structure of Temperament Questionnaire (STQ) is a self-report (for adult versions) or observer-administered (for children) questionnaire measuring 12 biologically-based characteristics of behaviour (temperament traits). These characteristics are the most consistent aspects of the behaviour of an individual across his or her lifespan and are relatively independent of the content of the situation. Initially, all versions of the STQ were developed and validated on adult samples and were designed for the purposes of organizational, educational and clinical psychology. Now there are also Child versions of the Short and Compact STQ, for administration by observers and/or guardians of the child. Items in all versions of the STQ are given in the form of a statement, with a response following the Likert scale format: "strongly disagree (1)," "disagree (2)," "agree (3)," "strongly agree (4)". The Compact STQ (STQ-77) is the only temperament test based on neurochemical framework of temperament (see Functional Ensemble of Temperament).

== Experimental background of the STQ models ==
The STQ is based on the Eastern-European tradition of experiments investigating the types and properties of nervous systems. This tradition is the longest in (110 years old) among all traditions of temperamental research. It started from extensive experiments on several species of mammals, and then continued with human adults and children within the Pavlovian Institute of Highest Nervous Activity (Pavlov, 1941, 1957). It then was continued within the Laboratory of Differential Psychophysiology and Differential Psychology (Institute of Psychology of the Russian Academy of Sciences), supervised by Boris Teplov (1963), then Vladimir Nebylitsyn (1972), and then Vladimir Rusalov. The STQ has several versions, which are based on two models of the structure of temperament: Rusalov's model and Trofimova's model. All versions of the STQ are based on the Activity-specific approach in temperament research. This approach differentiates between the traits related to 3 aspects of behaviour: social-verbal, physical and mental. All models and all modern versions of the STQ have 12 temperament scales.

=== Rusalov's versions of the STQ ===
There are two versions of the Structure of Temperament Questionnaire based on Rusalov's model: an Extended STQ (STQ-150) and a Short STQ (STQ-26) Both versions use 12 scales, which are grouped by 3 types of activities and 4 formal-dynamical aspects of activities, and a validity scale:

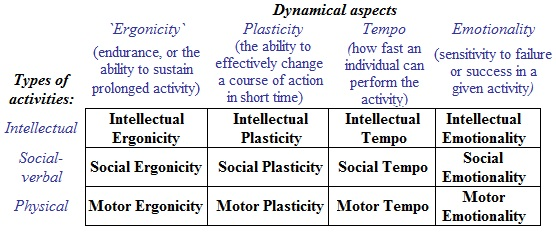
Rusalov's model of the STQ

The Extended STQ is a 150-item self-report measure with 144 items assigned to 12 temperament scales (12 items each), 1 validity scale (6 items), and 6 indexes, which combine these scales. The values on each of temperament scales vary between 12 and 48. The validity scale is designed to measure a social desirability tendency. The value on this scale varies from 6 and 24, and protocols having a score higher than 17 on this scale are considered to be invalid.

Testing with the STQ-150 takes 30 minutes.

There was also an initial version of Rusalov's model, STQ-105, which used the same items and scales as the 8 scales of the STQ-150 (Extended) version, with the exception of the three scales related to intellectual aspects of activities (Intellectual Ergonicity, Intellectual Plasticity, Intellectual Tempo, Intellectual Emotionality). Rusalov upgraded his model to 12 (4 x 3) components implemented in his Extended STQ in the mid-1990s.

Rusalov's version of the STQ measures 12 traits related to 4 aspects of behaviour (ergonicity (endurance), plasticity, tempo and emotionality), which are grouped by three aspects of behavior: motor-physical, social-verbal and intellectual. This model was incorporated in the extended Structure of Temperament Questionnaire. The factor analysis of the data received on Russian, Australian, American, Canadian, Urdu-Canadian, Polish-Canadian and Chinese samples confirmed a separation between the factors related to these three aspects of behavior.

Administration of the Extended STQ in practice was rather time-consuming, so Rusalov and Trofimova agreed to develop shorter, more compact versions of the STQ, which would be more suitable for screening purposes in clinical, organizational, vocational and educational settings. The items with the highest item-total correlations were selected for these versions. Rusalov developed the Short version of the STQ, and Trofimova developed the Compact version of the STQ (STQ-77). The Short STQ (STQ-26) is composed of 2 out of 12 items on each scale of the Extended STQ, including the validity scale. This version was adapted for the assessment of adults, teenagers, preschool and early school children.

=== Compact version of the STQ (STQ-77) (Trofimova's version) ===
During the studies of psychometric properties of the Extended STQ and a selection of the most valid items for the Compact version of the STQ Irina Trofimova suggested an update of the structure of the STQ based on her analysis of functionality of neurotransmitters, hormones and opioid systems (known as neurochemical framework Functional Ensemble of Temperament {. With the help of Prof. William Sulis, McMaster University, Canada, she developed the Compact version of the STQ (STQ-77). The STQ-77 consists of 12 temperament scales (6 items each), and a validity scale (5 items), i.e. in total 77 items. STQ-77 has adult and several pilot Childhood versions.

Testing with the STQ-77 takes 12-15 minutes.

The STQ-77 arranges the dimensions of temperament into functional groups differently than the STQ-150 (compare two Figures). Similar to the Rusalov's STQ-150, the STQ-77 differentiates between the traits regulating motor-physical, social-verbal and mental-probabilistic aspects of behaviour.

The differences between Trofimova's and Rusalov's models of temperament (and the structures of their versions of the STQ) are:

- grouping of temperament traits by 3 dynamical aspects (endurance, speed of integration of actions and orientation), presented as three columns in the Figure;
- a presence of orientation-related traits in Trofimova's model which were not included in Rusalov's model. These traits describe three types of behavioural orientation of a person with preferences to specific types of reinforcers: sensations (Sensation Seeking), other people's state (Empathy) or knowledge about causes of natural processes (a trait named as Sensitivity to Probabilities).
- a different structure of the traits related to emotionality. FET considers emotionality traits as systems amplifying three dynamical aspects of behaviour presented in the three columns of the model. Amplification of orientation aspects emerges in the trait of Neuroticism; amplification of speed of integration (i.e. immature integration) emerges as Impulsivity and amplification of subjective feeling of energetic capacities emerges in the trait of Self-confidence.

The STQ-77 is therefore partially based on the model of Rusalov's STQ-150, but also on the work of Luria describing the functionality of three neurophysiological systems: "sensory-informational block", "programming block" and "energetic block" regulating human behaviour. The re-arrangement of the STQ scales in the STQ-77 scales was also based on the analysis of commonalities between the leading European and American models of temperament and the latest findings in neurophysiology and neurochemistry. The support of the STQ-77 architecture was recently reinforced by the review in neurochemistry research resulted in development of a neurochemical model Functional Ensemble of Temperament (FET) that maps an interplay between main neurotransmitter systems and temperament traits

=== Description of the temperament scales of the STQ-77 ===
- Mental Endurance, or Attention (ERI): the ability to stay focused on selected features of objects with suppression of behavioural reactivity to other features
- Motor-physical Endurance (ERM): the ability of an individual to sustain prolonged physical activity using well-defined behavioural elements
- Social-verbal Endurance (sociability, ERS): the ability of an individual to sustain prolonged social-verbal activities using well-defined behavioural elements
- Plasticity (PL): the ability to adapt quickly to changes in situations, to change the program of action, and to shift between different tasks
- Motor-physical Tempo (TMM): speed of integration of physical manipulations of objects according to pre-defined scripts of actions
- Social-verbal Tempo (TMS): the preferred speed of speech and ability to understand fast speech on well-known topics, reading and sorting of known verbal material
- Sensitivity to Probabilities (PRO): the drive to gather information about uniqueness, frequency and values of objects/events, to differentiate their specific features, to project these features in future actions
- Sensation Seeking (SS): behavioural orientation to well-defined and existing sensational objects and events, underestimation of outcomes of risky behaviour
- Empathy (EMP): behavioural orientation to the emotional states/needs of others (ranging from empathic deafness in autism and schizophrenia disorders to social dependency)
- Neuroticism (NEU): A tendency to avoid novelty, unpredictable situations and uncertainty. Preference of well-known settings and people over unknown ones and a need for approval and feedback from people around.
- Impulsivity (IMP): Initiation of actions based on immediate emotional reactivity rather than by planning or rational reasoning
- Self-Confidence (SLF): A sense of security, dominance, self-esteem and in many cases entitlement for appreciation from others. In spite of the optimism about outcomes of his or her activities, the respondent might be negligent in details

== Versions in other languages and validation ==
=== Validation history of the STQ-105 and STQ-150 ===
The Extended (STQ-150) version was adapted to five languages: English, Russian, Chinese, Polish and Urdu.

Evidence for construct, concurrent and discriminatory validity of the STQ-105 and STQ-150 was demonstrated through significant correlations with the following measures:

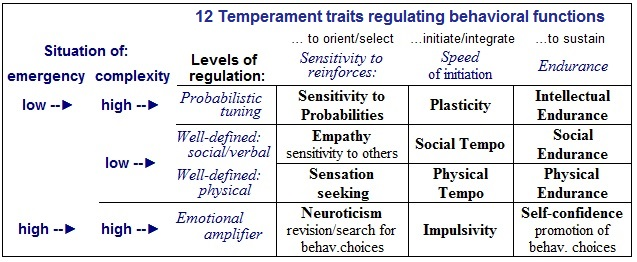
Trofimova's model: Structure of Temperament Questionnaire–Compact, STQ-77 ("Functional Ensemble of Temperament")

- Alcohol impact.
- Auditory and visual sensitivity
- Auditory attention
- Big Five Questionnaire (NEO-PI)
- Brain evoked potentials
- Cattell 16 Personality Factors Test (16PF).
- Cognitive complexity measures
- Dembo-Hoppe Level of aspiration
- Dissociative Experiences Scale
- DOTS-R (temperament test)
- EEG data.
- Eysenck Personality Questionnaire (EPQ)
- Gotshield IQ test
- Liri Interpersonal Relations Test
- Motivation in Achievements/Aspiration Technique
- Motivation of professional choices measure
- Motor reaction to auditory stimuli and motor rigidity
- Pavlovian Temperamental Survey (PTS)
- Psychopathology
- Reading speed and flexibility
- Rogers adaptivity scale
- Rosenzveig Test
- Rotter Locus of Control Scale (LOC)
- Self-regulation measures and satisfaction level
- School/colledge grades
- School Test of Intellectual Development (STID)
- Shepard IQ test
- Speed of verbal processing
- Spielberg State-Trait Anxiety Inventory (STAI)
- Psychogenetic studies
- Taylor Manifest Anxiety Scale (MAS)
- Thomas & Chess adapted test of temperament
- Torrance Nonverbal Test of Creative Thinking
- Verbal tasks.
- Wechsler IQ test (WAIS)
- 25 measures of Mobility and Plasticity

=== Factor structure of the STQ-150 ===
Factor analysis of the Russian version of the STQ-150 consistently showed four factors: Motor-physical activity (which includes Motor Ergonicity, Motor Plasticity, Motor Tempo), Social-Verbal activity (which includes Social Ergonicity, Social Plasticity, Social Tempo), Intellectual Activity (which includes Intellectual Ergonicity, Intellectual Plasticity, Intellectual Tempo) and Emotionality (3 scales of Emotionality)

The administration of the English version of the STQ to American, Australian, and Canadian samples showed that the factor structure of this version is similar to the Russian language version, and that the English version possesses good reliability and internal consistency,

Chinese (STQ-C), Urdu (STQ-U) and Polish (STQ-P) Extended versions of the STQ, administered among corresponding populations, showed reliability coefficients in the range 0.70-0.86, item-total correlations in the range 0.42-0.73, and all versions demonstrated robust factor structures similar to those of the original version

=== The validation of the STQ-77 ===
The Compact (STQ-77) version was adapted to three languages: English, Russian and Chinese. Moreover, evidence for the construct, concurrent and discriminatory validity of the STQ-77 was demonstrated through significant correlations with the following measures:

- Beck Anxiety Inventory (BAI)
- Comorbid Major Depression and Generalized Anxiety symptoms
- Five-Factors Personality test (NEO-FFI)
- EEG studies
- Eysenck Personality Questionnaire (EPQ)
- Generalized Anxiety symptoms
- Hamilton Depression Inventory (HDI)
- high-school grades
- I7 Impulsiveness Questionnaire (Eysenck, S. et al., 1985) (I-7)
- Major Depression symptoms
- Motivation in Achievements/Aspiration level scale
- Pavlovian Temperamental Survey (PTS)
- Personality Assessment Inventory
- Psychotic disorders
- Rotter Locus of Control Scale
- speed of performance in mental activities
- speed of verbal processing
- State-Trait Anxiety Inventory (STAI)
- Symptom Checklist (SCL-90)
- Verbal classification tasks
- Zuckerman Sensation Seeking Scales (SSS)

The clinical validation studies conducted with the use of the STQ-77 showed that its scales match the structure of symptoms of mental disorders described in main classifications DSM-5 and ICD much better than other temperament models, and they are capable of differentiating between anxiety and depression

The validation of the STQ-77 structure was successful by its comparison to the main findings in neurochemistry. As the result of such comparison the scales of the STQ-77 were linked to the ensemble interactions between main neurotransmitter systems (presented as a neurochemical Functional Ensemble of Temperament model)

=== Factor structure of the STQ-77 ===
The Confirmatory Factor Analysis of the Compact STQ (STQ-77) using data from Canadian, Chinese, Russian, and Brazilian samples shows a satisfactory fit of the traditional 4-factor STQ activity-specific model, grouping the scales to the factors of Motor, Social, Intellectual activity and Emotionality and having 2 correlated residuals (from the new scale of Sensitivity to Sensations to Impulsivity and Neuroticism scales) with the CFI > .90, RMSEA < .07 and RMSR < .06.

The STQ-77 arranges the dimensions of temperament into 12 components differently than it is done in the STQ-150 (see and compare two Figures). The structure of the STQ-77 relies on verified neurochemical biomarkers and expands a rough 4-factor structure derived from factor analysis. Similar to the Rusalov's STQ-150, the STQ-77 differentiates between the traits regulating motor-physical, social-verbal and mental-probabilistic aspects of behaviour

=== Language versions ===
Beginning from 2017 the STQ-77 is offered for free for a non-commercial use (research and personal testing) in 24 languages: Bulgarian, Chinese-Simplified, Chinese-Traditional, Dari, Dutch, English, Estonian, Finnish, French, German, Hebrew, Hindu, Italian, Japanese, Korean, Norwegian, Persian, Polish, Portuguese, Russian, Serbian, Spanish, Swedish, and Urdu. There are versions for screening child temperament in English and Russian for the ages 0–3, 4-7, 8-11 and 12-16, freely available on the website of test developers. There are also several child versions in other languages.

A battery of behavioural testing in line with 12 components of the STQ-77/FET has been developed for adult and children age groups in English and Russian. Behavioural testing batteries are designed for individual and in-group (class) testing.

The extended STQ-150 was also adapted in 6 languages: English (using US, Australian and Canadian samples), Chinese-Simplified, Russian, Polish, Urdu and German. The STQ-150 has an old, less efficient scale structure in comparison to the STQ-77 and, therefore, is not recommended for further translations.
