= Strelau =

Strelau or Strejlau is a surname. Notable people with the surname include:

- Jan Strelau (1931–2020), Polish psychologist
- Andrzej Strejlau (born 1940), Polish handball player, footballer, and football manager
