= Marvin Zuckerman =

American psychologist (1928–2018)

- Born: March 21, 1928; Chicago
- Died: November 8, 2018 (aged 90); Philadelphia
- Education: New York University
- Known for: Sensory Deprivation; Psychobiology of Personality; Multiple Affect Adjective Check List (MAACL); Zuckerman-Kuhlman Personality Questionnaire (ZKPQ); Sensation Seeking Scale (SSS)
- Scientific career
- Fields: Personality, Sensation seeking
- Workplaces: University of Delaware
- Thesis: The effect of frustration on the perception of neutral and aggressive words (1954)

Marvin Zuckerman (March 21, 1928, in Chicago – November 8, 2018) was professor emeritus of Psychology at the University of Delaware. Heknown for his research into the psychobiological basis of human personality, sensory deprivation, mood state measurement, and sensation seeking. His work was particularly inspired by eminent research psychologists, Hans Eysenck (13th most highly cited psychologist) and Arnold Buss.

== Academic career ==
Zuckerman earned his Ph.D. at New York University in 1954 in clinical psychology. He then took up a position at Norwich State Hospital in Connecticut where subsequently he was hired at the Institute for Psychiatric Research undertaking personality assessments and where he constructed the Multiple Affect Adjective Check List (a state-trait self-report measure of anxiety, depression, and hostility). At the institute, Zuckerman undertook research into anxiety and sensory deprivation (funded by NIMH grants) which ultimately led him to develop his well known Sensation Seeking Scale. Subsequently, in 1969, he accepted an academic position in the Department of Psychology at the University of Delaware, where he spent more than 30 years teaching and undertaking research into sensation seeking and personality. His biochemical, psychophysiological and genetic studies demonstrated that sensation seeking was a major biologically based trait construct. Also, his research into augmenting/reducing of the cortical evoked potential provided a reliable model of brain functioning in high and low sensation seekers. Zuckerman spent sabbaticals with eminent colleagues Hans Eysenck, Jeffrey Gray, and Robert Plomin, in England, where factor analytic studies showed that a combination of impulsivity and sensation seeking formed a reliable personality dimension.

In 1975, Zuckerman commenced a series of presentations at international meetings in Europe. Zuckerman credits Hans Eysenck's work into the biological approach to personality as being inspirational, before spending a year with Hans Eysenck at the Maudsley Hospital in London. He also credits Eysenck for giving him the opportunity to work with David Fulker, and Sybil Eysenck on the genetics of sensation seeking at the Maudsley Institute in London. Zuckerman has written hundreds of highly influential research articles, book chapters, and many prominent books. He also serves on the editorial board of Personality and Individual Differences, which was founded by Hans Eysenck (editor-in-chief).

== Life ==
Zuckerman retired in September 2002, aged 74 years and resided in Philadelphia where he wrote journal articles and invited book chapters for international handbooks until shortly before his death. as well as having revised his 1991 book the Psychobiology of Personality, and writing new books on sensation seeking and personality science, respectively.

== Sensation seeking ==
Sensation seeking is described as a personality trait construct that is defined by the search for feelings and experiences that are "varied, novel, complex and intense." Zuckerman developed the sensation seeking construct during his tenure at the University of Delaware. His sensation seeking research led him to create a personality instrument called the Sensation Seeking Scale (SSS) which purports to measure individual differences in terms of their sensory preferences. The Sensation Seeking Scale was designed to measure how much stimulation a person requires and the excitement that is admitted. Zuckerman hypothesized that people who are high sensation seekers require a lot of stimulation to reach their Optimal Level of Arousal. When the stimulation or sensory input is not met, the person finds the experience unpleasant. Zuckerman argues that sensation seeking is one of many "core traits" that describe human personality, and is independent of other major dimensions of personality (e.g., Extraversion-Introversion, Neuroticism-Stability, and Psychoticism - as measured in the Eysenck Personality Questionnaire or EPQ-R).

== Selected bibliography ==
- Zuckerman, M. (1979). Sensation Seeking: Beyond the Optimal Level of Arousal. Hillsdale, NJ: Erlbaum.
- Zuckerman, M. (1994). Behavioral Expressions and Biosocial Bases of Sensation Seeking. New York: Cambridge University Press.
- Zuckerman, M. (1999). Vulnerability to Psychopathology: A Biosocial Model. Washington, DC: American Psychological Association.
- Zuckerman, M. (2005). Psychobiology of Personality (2nd edn.). New York: Cambridge University Press. ISBN 052181569X
- Zuckerman, M. (2007). Sensation Seeking and Risky Behavior. Washington, DC: American Psychological Association.
- Zuckerman, M. (2011). Personality Science: Three Approaches and their Applications to the Causes and Treatment of Depression. Washington, DC: American Psychological Association.
- Aluja, A., Kuhlman, M., Aluja, A. (2010).
