= Vernacular painting in China =

Paintings of everyday domestic life

A vernacular painting in China is a realistic, folk depiction of scenes from everyday domestic life.

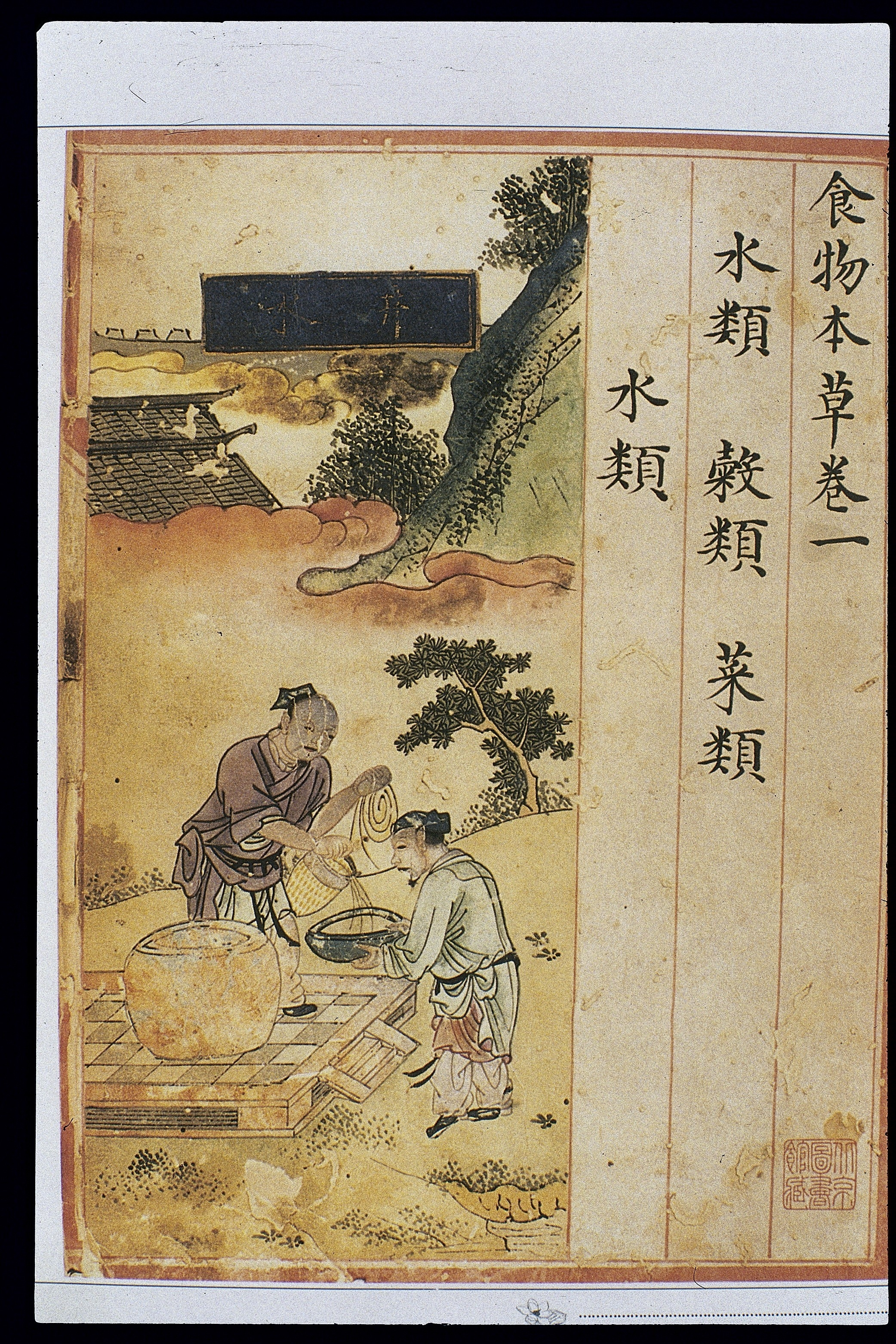
vernacular paintings

The term is often applied to paintings that were frequently displayed in High Qing China during the New Year and birthdays. In his 2010 book Pictures for Use and Pleasure, art historian James Cahill defines the term as "a great body of painting, created over the centuries by studio artists working in the cities, artists who produced pictures as required for diverse everyday domestic and other uses." These paintings were often created on silk, and pieces created for women were known for depicting "a range of topics not dealt with in literati painting."

The paintings revealed Chinese life and the workings of Chinese society, Vernacular paintings were frequently created by master artists with only small prestige in city studios. They also differed from other paintings made during the era in that they were seen as functional and frequently lacked inscriptions, whereas the culture of the time "professed to despise functionalism."

As Chinese connoisseurs preferred paintings where the artist's brushwork skill, as well as their feelings and temperament, showed in the art, these paintings were seen as lesser in value and considered to be irrelevant. Some of the elements in Vernacular Paintings, such as the use of paintings for celebrations and life events such as weddings and birthdays, would later be co-opted by some of the more elite art styles such as Shanghai painting.
