= Functional Ensemble of Temperament =

Neurochemical model

Functional Ensemble of Temperament (FET) is a neurochemical model suggesting specific functional roles of main neurotransmitter systems in the regulation of behaviour.

== Earlier theories ==
Medications can adjust the release of brain neurotransmitters in cases of depression, anxiety disorder, schizophrenia and other mental disorders because an imbalance within neurotransmitter systems can emerge as consistent characteristics in behaviour compromising people's lives. All people have a weaker form of such imbalance in at least one of such neurotransmitter systems that make each of us distinct from one another. The impact of this weak imbalance in neurochemistry can be seen in the consistent features of behaviour in healthy people (temperament). In this sense temperament (as neuro-chemically-based individual differences) and mental illness represents varying degrees along the same continuum of neurotransmitter imbalance in neurophysiological systems of behavioural regulation.

In fact, multiple temperament traits (such as Impulsivity, sensation seeking, neuroticism, endurance, plasticity, sociability or extraversion) have been linked to brain neurotransmitters and hormone systems.

By the end of the 20th century, it became clear that the human brain operates with more than a dozen neurotransmitters and a large number of neuropeptides and hormones. The relationships between these different chemical systems are complex as some of them suppress and some of them induce each other's release during neuronal exchanges. This complexity of relationships devalues the old approach of assigning "inhibitory vs. excitatory" roles to neurotransmitters: the same neurotransmitters can be either inhibitory or excitatory depending on what system they interact with. It became clear that an impressive diversity of neurotransmitters and their receptors is necessary to meet a wide range of behavioural situations, but the links between temperament traits and specific neurotransmitters are still a matter of research. Several attempts were made to assign specific (single) neurotransmitters to specific (single) traits. For example, dopamine was proposed to be a neurotransmitter of the trait of Extraversion, noradrenaline was linked to anxiety, and serotonin was thought to be a neurotransmitter of an inhibition system. These assignments of neurotransmitter functions appeared to be an oversimplification when confronted by the evidence of much more diverse functionality. Research groups led by Petra Netter in Germany, Lars Farde in Karolinska Institute in Sweden and Trevor Robbins in Cambridge, UK had most extensive studies of the links between temperament/personality traits or dynamical properties of behavior and groups of neurotransmitters.

== Development of the FET model ==
The architecture of the Functional Ensemble of Temperament (FET) was developed by Trofimova as the Compact version of the Structure of Temperament Questionnaire (STQ-77) in 1997–2007. The differentiation between the rows of the FET inherits the activity-specific approach to the structure of temperament proposed by Rusalov in mid-1980s. According to this approach, the traits of temperament (and behavioural regulation) related to motor-physical, social-verbal and mental aspects of activities are based on different neurophysiological systems and should be assessed separately (so you can see a separation of traits into 3 rows related to these 3 types of activities). The 3-column structure of the FET framework follows Alexander Luria theory of three functional neuroanatomic systems (sensory-informational, programming and energetic) and is in line with functional constructivism approach. This approach views all behaviour as being constructed and generated anew based on individual's capacities and demands of the situation

The final STQ-77/FET model considers 12 systems (and temperament traits): 9 systems (and traits) regulating the formal functional aspects of behaviour (energetic, dynamic and orientational, each assessed in three domains (intellectual, physical and social-verbal) together with 3 systems related to emotionality (Neuroticism, Impulsivity and a disposition of Satisfaction (formerly called Self-Confidence) (see Figure).

The differences between Trofimova's and Rusalov's models of temperament (and the structures of their versions of the STQ) are:

- the choice of the grouping of temperament traits by three dynamical aspects (endurance, speed of integration of actions and orientation), presented as three columns in the Figure;
- a presence of orientation-related traits in Trofimova's model which were not included in Rusalov's model. These traits describe the behavioural orientation of a person with preferences to specific types of reinforcers: sensations (Sensation Seeking), other people's state (Empathy) or knowledge about causes of natural processes (a trait named as Sensitivity to Probabilities).
- a different structure of the traits related to emotionality. FET considers emotionality traits as systems amplifying three dynamical aspects of behaviour presented in the three columns of the model. Amplification of orientation aspects emerges in the trait of Neuroticism; amplification of speed of integration (i.e. immature integration) emerges as Impulsivity and amplification of subjective feeling of energetic capacities emerges in the trait of Satisfaction (Self-confidence).

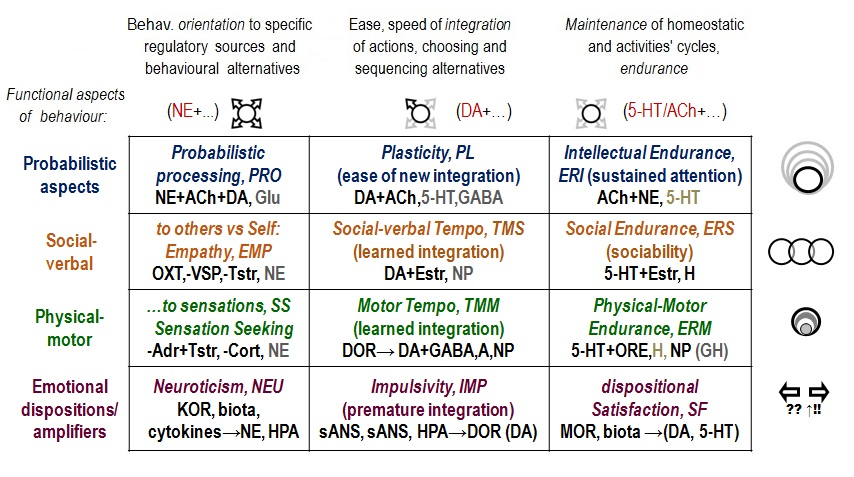
The structure of neurochemical framework Functional Ensemble of Temperament (FET) corresponds to 12 universal aspects of construction of behaviour. Shadowed text relates to temperament traits; blue capital letters highlight the lead, and grey – supporting neurotransmitters for the given trait. Note: 5-HT: serotonin; DA: dopamine; NE: noradrenalin; ACh: acetylcholine; Glu: Glutamate; H: histamine; A: adenosine; Estr: estrogen; NP: neuropeptides; GH: Growth Hormone; ORE: orexins, KOR, MOR, DOR: kappa-, delta- and mu-opioid receptors systems correspondingly; HPA: hypothalamic-pituitary-adrenal axis; Tstr – Testosterone, Adr – Adrenaline, Cort – Cortisol

.

In 2007–2013 this STQ-77 model of temperament was reviewed and compared to the main findings in neurophysiology, neurochemistry, clinical psychology and kinesiology resulting in the neurochemical FET model offered by Irina Trofimova, McMaster University. Trevor Robbins, Cambridge University who collaborated with Trofimova on this project in 2014–2016 suggested a revision of the part of the FET neurochemical hypothesis related to the trait of Intellectual (mental) Endurance (known in cognitive psychology also as "sustained attention"). This neurochemical component of the FET hypothesis was upgraded in 2015 by underlying a key role of acetylcholine and noradrenalin in sustained attention. In February 2018, by the suggestion of Dr Marina Kolbeneva (Institute of Psychology, Russian Academy of Sciences) the scale Self-Confidence was renamed as the scale of dispositional Satisfaction.

== Overview of the model ==
The final STQ-77/FET framework classifies temperament traits and their neurochemical biomarkers into 12 components: nine components regulating the formal functional aspects of behaviour (energetic, dynamic and orientational) each assessed in three domains (intellectual, physical and social-verbal); also three components related to emotionality (Neuroticism, Impulsivity and Satisfaction (Self-Confidence)) (see Figure)

The FET framework summarized existing literature showing the nine non-emotionality traits are regulated by the monoamines (MA) (noradrenalin, dopamine, serotonin), acetylcholine and neuropeptide systems, whereas the three emotionality-related traits emerge as a dysregulation of opioid receptors systems that have direct control over MA systems. Importantly, the FET model suggests that there is no one-to-one correspondence between the neurotransmitter systems underlying temperament traits (or mental disorders) but instead specific ensemble relationships between these systems emerge as temperament traits. The FET framework is based only on the strongest consensus points in the research studying the role of neurotransmitter in behavioural regulation and the components of temperament; it doesn't list more controversial links between these multiple systems.

Temperament trait	Description	Hypothesized links to neurochemical systems ^{†}
	Behavioral orientation traits	NE +...
Sensation seeking	behavioral orientation to well-defined and existing sensational objects and events, underestimation of outcomes of risky behaviour	high Testosterone, fluctuating Adrenaline (leading to occasional HPA under-arousal), low cortisol, in interactions with the brain NE systems
Empathy	behavioral orientation to the emotional states/needs of others versus Self-orientation (ranging from social dependency/semi-delusional social perception to selfishness and insensitivity to social expectations known in Asperger syndrome)	Higher OXY and lower vasopressin functions interacting with the brain NE system
Sensitivity to Probabilities (analytic abilities)	the drive to gather information about commonality, frequency and values of events, to differentiate their specific features, to project these features in future actions	Interaction between neocortical Glu, NE, DA and ACh systems
	Speed of action-integration traits	DA +...
Physical Tempo	speed of integration of an action in physical manipulations with objects with well-defined scripts of actions	DA-GABA interaction in basal ganglia, DOR, with involvement of ACh interneurons, NP and adenosine
Social-verbal Tempo	the preferred speed of speech and ability to understand fast speech on well-known topics, reading and sorting of known verbal material	Estrogen, NP under DA control, especially in dorsal striatum
Plasticity	the ability to adapt quickly to changes in situations, to generate new program of action, and to shift between different tasks	DA-ACh-GABA interaction with ACh systems in the cortex-basal ganglia networks
	Maintenance of activity traits	5-HT, ACh +...
Physical Endurance	the ability of an individual to sustain prolonged physical activity using well-defined behavioral elements	5-HT, orexins, NP, histamine
Social-verbal Endurance (sociability)	sociability; the ability of an individual to sustain prolonged social-verbal activities using well-defined behavioral elements	5-HT, estrogen, histamine
Mental Endurance (sustained attention)	the ability to stay focused on selected features of objects with suppression of behavioral reactivity to other features	Neocortical NE-ACh (with a lead of ACh for tonic attention and a lead of NE for novelty aspects), supported by cortical 5-HT
	Emotional amplifier traits	Opioid receptor systems + ...
Neuroticism	A tendency to avoid novelty, unpredictable situations and uncertainty.	KOR, cytokins or some Gut microbiota leading to activation of HPA and/or NE release
Impulsivity	Initiation of actions based on immediate emotional reactivity	sANS, HPA axis → DOR > MOR, DA
Satisfaction	A sense of security, disposition for a good mood; in high values – overconfidence with negligence to details	MOR, some Gut microbiota →(5-HT, DA)

^{†} Neurotransmitter systems: 5-HT: serotonin; DA: dopamine; NE: noradrenalin; ACh: acetylcholine; Glu: glutamate; OXY: oxytocin; VSP: vasopressin; NP: Neuropeptides; KOR, MOR, DOR: kappa-, mu- and delta-opioid receptors correspondingly; sANS - sympathetic autonomic nervous system; HPA - hypothalamic–pituitary–adrenal axis.

The FET points out that opioid receptor systems are involved not only in regulation of emotional dispositions but also amplify three non-emotionality aspects of behaviour (KOR for orientation, DOR for integration of actions and MOR of approval-maintenance of behaviour). This involvement was confirmed for MOR systems that bind endorphins: experiments show that MOR overstimulation influences hypothalamic serotonin and Brain-derived neurotrophic factor release and affecting endurance aspects of behaviour. The interplay within hormonal systems and its interaction with serotonin also appeared to be a factor is social emotions, such as shame and guilt

== FET model and classifications of psychiatric disorders ==
FET framework was proposed to simplify classifications of psychiatric disorders (DSM, ICD) using 12 functional aspects of behaviour that this model highlights. Clinical studies showed good differential power of the FET framework for various diagnoses of psychopathology. For example, depressed people had low endurance and psychomotor slowdown in their temperament profiles. In contrast to them, patients with Generalized Anxiety Disorder had higher impulsivity and neuroticism. FET-developers suggested that every symptom in DSM/ICD diagnoses can be mapped into a specific FET code reflecting a disregulation within well-documented neurochemical systems.
