= Blueprint (Plomin book) =

2018 book by Robert Plomin

Blueprint: How DNA Makes Us Who We Are
- First edition (UK)
- Author: Robert Plomin
- Language: English
- Subject: Behavioural genetics
- Genre: Nonfiction
- Published: 2018
- Publisher: Allen Lane (UK); The MIT Press (US)
- Pages: 280
- ISBN: 978-0-262-03916-1
- OCLC: 1029797905

Blueprint: How DNA Makes Us Who We Are is a book by behavioral geneticist Robert Plomin, first published in 2018 by the MIT Press and Allen Lane. The book argues that genetic factors, and specifically variations in individuals' DNA, have a large effect on human psychological traits, accounting for approximately half of all variation in such traits. The book also claims that genes play a more important role in people's personalities than does the environment. In Blueprint, Plomin argues that environmental effects on human psychological differences, although they exist, are "...mostly random – unsystematic and unstable – which means that we cannot do much about them."

== Reviews ==
Science journalist Matt Ridley praised Blueprint as "a hugely important book." Behavior geneticist Kathryn Paige Harden criticized the book for overstating the importance of genes for the development of human traits, writing, "Insisting that DNA matters is scientifically accurate; insisting that it is the only thing that matters is scientifically outlandish." Steven Mithen gave the book a mixed review in the Guardian, in which he wrote, "I am happy to bow to Plomin as a psychologist and a geneticist, but I found his sociology rather lacking, in fact quite baffling." Nathaniel Comfort criticized the book for promoting genetic determinism and "play[ing] fast and loose with the concept of heritability". He concluded that "Ultimately, if unintentionally, Blueprint is a road map for regressive social policy." Journalist David Goodhart reviewed the book more positively, calling it "an important and challenging book that reveals to the general reader what has quietly become a new scientific consensus: psychological traits, including intelligence, are significantly influenced by our genes." Geneticist Barbara Jennings reviewed the book positively, suggesting that those who have criticized it for being "a manifesto for genetic determinism" are "misreading [...] the book".
