= G Is for Genes =

2013 book by Robert Plomin

G is for Genes: The Impact of Genetics on Education and Achievement
- Author: Robert Plomin, Kathryn Ashbury
- Published: November 2013 (Wiley Blackwell)
- Pages: 216

G is for Genes: The Impact of Genetics on Education and Achievement is a 2013 book by Robert Plomin, Professor of Behavioral Genetics at the King's College London and Kathryn Ashbury, professor of education the Centre for Psychology and Education at the University of York. The book summarizes findings of behavioural genetics that are relevant to education and offers policy recommendations. It proposes that children be DNA and IQ tested in order to inform their school programmes. It is written for a wide audience including parents, educators and policy makers.

== Part One: In theory ==
Part one consists of 11 chapters that present the field of behavioural genetics and what implications some findings have on education. It addresses issues such as twin studies, sex differences and socio-economic status. Part one is summarized in 7 "big ideas" which are the following:

=== Achievement and Ability Vary, Partly for Genetic Reasons ===
Average school performance doesn't change the fact that half of the students will fall above and the other half below the average. Seeing those scoring below average as ‘failing’ wastes resources on approaches that have little or no effect. Instead of making pupils identical, the diversity should be embraced after providing a certain level of common education.

=== The Abnormal is Normal ===
Students that are high performing or low performing are no more likely to be more genetically exceptional than an average student and same genes influence performance all across the distribution of performance. In other words, a math professor and a student struggling with mathematics are using the same genes when they perform mathematical tasks. There are many genes with small effect which are working together in an interplay with many environmental experiences and the same genes can have allelic differences. This is why turning on or off genes is unlikely to have large effects.

=== Continuity is Genetic and Change is Environmental ===
School performance is influenced by the same genes across life span and dramatic fluctuations in performance are likely to be caused by environment, not biology. Even though it's likely that emerging biotechnology will make it possible to have predictive genetic information relevant to learning, the predictions can never reach full accuracy because of environmental factors.

=== Genes are Generalists and Environments are Specialists ===
Genes that influence one cognitive ability are likely to influence others as well; for example high performance on a reading test predicts high performance on math test. Education, on the other hand, is more specific and increasing performance in one area doesn't transmit to other areas to the same extent.

=== Environments are Influenced by Genes ===
Genetics influence individuals as they select their environment.

=== The Environments that Matter the Most are Unique to Individuals ===
Identical twins raised in same households and who are taught by the same teachers still differ from each other. The differences not explained by shared genes or family household, the "non-shared environment", accounts for most of the environmental influence.

=== Equality of Opportunity Requires Diversity of Opportunity ===
Perfect equality of opportunity would still result in differences between individuals, but these differences would be more due to genetics. There is a need to introduce more choice so different natures can be nurtured to full potential.

== Part Two: In Practice ==
The part two consists of eleven practical policy recommendations and their genetic basis.

=== Minimize the Core Curriculum and Test Basic skills ===
The mandatory learning should be minimized to the skills that are required to succeed in society, such as reading and numeracy.

=== Increase Choice ===
Pupils should be able to choose from a large variety of subject options according to their own interests, particularly as they get older.

=== Forget About Labels ===
Extra help should be given to those who need it as quickly as possible with as little labels and bureaucracy as possible.

=== Teach the Child As Well As the Class ===
Pupils should have an Individual Education Plan that would be reviewed and revised each year and would serve as the basis for their school-leaving certificate.

=== Teach Children How To Succeed ===
IQ and self-confidence have a positive impact on education and both can be improved with coaching. Such coaching is described as "Thinking Skills Sessions" and should be provided for an hour every week for every student.

=== Promote Equal Opportunities from an Early Age as Foundation for Social Mobility in the Future ===
Disadvantaged children from age two should be offered free high-quality preschool education. All children aged 3 – 4 should be offered high quality preschool education tailored according to their needs and extra support should be provided to all low-SES families from birth.

=== Equalize Extracurricular Opportunities at School ===
The playing field for extracurricular activities should be made more equal by providing poor families with vouchers that can be exchanged to extracurricular activities based in schools or elsewhere.

=== Create a Two Stage PE System ===
Pupils should first have a standardized physical education program where they would be exposed to different activities. The next stage would be choice-driven and pupils would be given the opportunity to choose from the activities introduced to them in the earlier stage.

=== Change the Destination ===
Make apprenticeships more attractive and affordable to employers and increase the number and variety of options available for work and college based vocational training.

=== Train New Teachers in Genetics and Give Them Tools to Put it Into Practice ===
Include a course on genetics of learning in teacher training and make useful information about personalization of education available to all schools.

=== Big Is Beautiful ===
Make the schools bigger to increase capability to provide larger variety of options. Make the links between different levels of schooling stronger.

== Reception ==
The book sparked public debate and was for example featured in BBC radio programme The Moral Maze. Steven Pinker wrote in his review of the book "This may be the most important book about educational theory and practice in the new millennium, giving educators, policy-makers, and parents much to think about."
