= Sensation Seeking Scale =

Psychological instrument for measuring sensation seeking

The Sensation Seeking Scale is one of the most common psychological instruments for measuring sensation seeking. It was created in 1964 by Marvin Zuckerman, at the University of Delaware. Zuckerman created the scale with the purpose of better understanding personality traits such as neuroticism, antisocial behavior, and psychopathy. This has gone through a few iterations and is currently on its 1978 version: SSS-V. There are 4 different aspects (subscales), which are: Thrill and Adventure Seeking (TAS); Disinhibition (Dis); Experience Seeking (ES); and Boredom Susceptibility (BS). Each subscale contains 10 items, making a total of 40 items. Zuckerman has proposed that these 'traits' come from a psycho-biological interaction.

== History ==
The first Sensation Seeking Scale (SSS) was created by Marvin Zuckerman and others in 1964. This was considered Form I and Form II was similar, though slightly revised. Analysis and use of these two forms showed that there was more than one dimension to sensation seeking behavior. This paper found that there were four components to sensation seeking: thrill; social; visual; and antisocial. Form III was the introduction of an experimental form with 113 items on it. In 1971, the scale was further revised to Form IV and the sensation seeking components were revised with it to include: thrill, experience, disinhibition and boredom susceptibility. This scale also had some reliability issues and the scoring and so in 1978 it was revised one more time to the current Form V. In 1993 a new scale was developed for children. The scale slightly changed the factors to thrill and adventure seeking, drug and alcohol attitudes and social disinhibition.

== Outcomes/components ==
Items from the Sensation Seeking Scale include:

- Thrill and Adventure seeking (SSS-TAS): also known as ‘stimulus seeking’ or ‘fearlessness’. Individuals tend to participate in high stimulus activities such as sky diving, mountain climbing, bungee jumping, etc. Studied anywhere from those with psychopath tendencies to antisocial behaviors.
- Disinhibition (SSS-DIS): Participating in drug use, alcohol use, vandalism, and/or unsafe sex. Seen more in adolescence compared to adulthood, and more in males than in females.
- Experience seeking (SSS-ES): Individuals who participate in travel, psychedelic drugs, art, music, and other less risky sensations.
- Boredom Susceptibility (SSS-BS): Individual who is prone to boredom and has a need for a constant, new external stimuli, such as social interaction or activities, such as movies.

== Scale versions ==
=== Adult ===
In the late 1950s, Zuckerman and colleagues conducted a study using a sensory deprivation isolation chamber and recorded participants' reactions. Reactions ranged from anxiety or boredom to hallucinations and cognitive inefficiency. A standardized test was sought out to help predict these reactions, but at the time there was no such test. They began to construct their own scale and began with the optimal level of stimulation and optimal level of arousal theories as the bases of the scale. These two theories can be traced back to Wilhelm Wundt and Sigmund Freud. They opt to put items into a forced-choice form to avoid responses that were socially desirable and with that the first sensation seeking scale was formed, SSS General Scale. Since then revisions have been made to the original scale.

The SSS-II General Scale can still be used, but it does not include the four component scales that are largely measured with the more updated versions. The 22-item scale was originally developed to have a much more narrow construct validity when it came to predicting sensory deprivation responses. Experiments done using this scale showed the possibility of subfactors existing within each item. These factors are later used to form the SSS Form IV. The SSS-IV scale has 72 items that are unevenly distributed among the four factors, thrill and adventure seeking, experience seeking, disinhibition, and boredom susceptibility. It also includes the SSS-II General Scale. Research on drinking, extreme sports and drugs were done using these scales.

Just like the SSS-IV, the SSS-VI measures the same four subfacets. There are a total of 128 items that are divided between experience scales and intentions scales, where each items falls into a 3-point Likert-type scale. The current form, Form V (SSS-V) of the Sensation Seeking Scale is the most used scale when measuring sensation seeking. This scale is a 40-item self-report that measures all four components. It was meant to shorten the test and is estimated to take about 20 minutes to complete. Each subscales is presented with 10 items and the SSS total score is used to measure sensation seeking as an overall score.

=== Children ===
The SSS was only designed with adults and late adolescent in mind, so a new scale was sought out for children. Sensation Seeking Scale for Children (SSSC) was introduced in 1991, and held a similar resemblance to the adult version, with the exception of items involving substance abuse and sexual activity. Three factors are measured in the children's scale: thrill and adventure seeking, drug and alcohol attitudes, and social disinhibition. Children aged 7 through 12 years were used to measure the reliability and validity of the scale. The scale was later changed to appropriately included items regarding substance use and sexual activity. There is also a Spanish version and Swedish scale designed for children, for these scales the ages range from 11 to 15 and 12 to 15 respectively. A study conducted on children using a Brief Sensation Seeking Scale for Children (BSSS-C) suggested that children high on sensation seeking would run a high risk of engaging in risky behavior at a young age.

=== Brief Sensation Seeking Scale (BSSS) ===
Another version of the sensation seeking scale is the Brief Sensation Seeking Scale (BSSS). This is one that was developed by Hoyle et al. They developed the first BSSS in 2002 to fill the need of a practical application of the Sensation Seeking Scale. The reason that the original does not work well is that it is a 40 question test while the BSSS is only 8 questions and still carries reasonable reliability and validity. The biggest commercial use for this is in marketing and advertisement. The truth campaign is one company that uses the BSSS to try to determine whether or not students will smoke. They used a 4-question version of the BSSS to try to determine if young people who scored higher on the BSSS were also more likely to smoke. They were then also able to use people who did score higher on this scale to test anti-smoking messages before using them in advertisements.

== Experimental evidence ==
=== Testing in animals ===
In recent years, experiments have been conducted with rats. When given cortisol, researchers saw that some rats would become more addicted and need more of the cortisol to keep the same high. When done with neurotransmitters; epinephrine, nor-epinephrine, serotonin, and 5-hydroxytryptamine there was a relationship with personality traits. Though these tests are more difficult to produce in human subjects, due to ethical concerns.

=== Testing in healthy individuals ===
Research in human participants has also been done. Researchers provided either d-amphetamine or a placebo pill. Those participants, both men and women would take larger amounts, more often of the d-amphetamine pill where ranked higher on the sensation seeking scale. This study however, did not have significant findings for the thrill seeking components in participants.

=== Testing in psychological disorders ===
Another experiment included salivary testosterone (Sal-T) taken from young men, all of whom had some certain psychological disorder including; bipolar, depression, ADHD, and addiction. Those men with higher testosterone levels also have higher levels of sensation seeking, especially the boredom susceptibility. In the same study, research found that high levels of DRD4, a dopamine receptor, was a predictor for the sensation seeking component of thrill seeking. Enhancing Zuckerman's notion that sensation seeking is a psycho-biological interaction.

== Applications ==
This scale has been used in a variety of research studies and it has been used often when researching college students. Studies include how likely students are to play drinking games, condom use during sex was measured with a sensation seeking scale made by Seth C. Kalichman, and the likelihood of drug use and gambling.
