= Aeroflot Flight 1036 =

1972 aviation accident

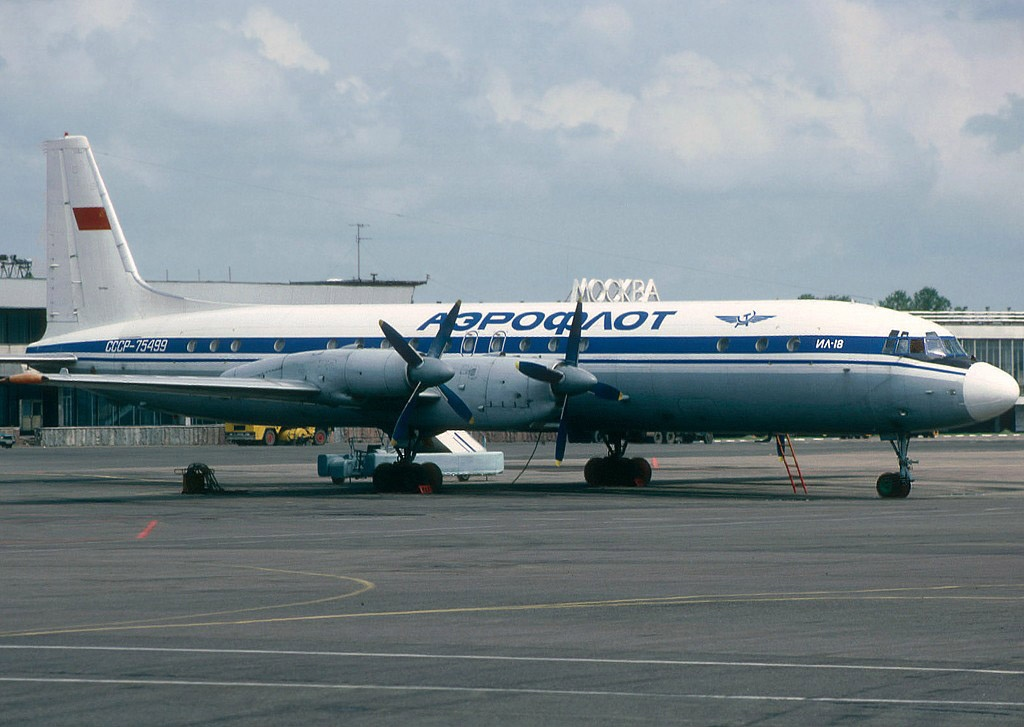
- An Aeroflot Ilyushin Il-18, similar to the one involved in the accident

Occurrence
- Date: 1 October 1972
- Summary: Unknown (possibly bird strikes)
- Site: Black Sea; 43°23′13″N 39°53′54″E

Aircraft
- Aircraft type: Ilyushin Il-18V
- Operator: Aeroflot
- Registration: CCCP-75507
- Flight origin: Sochi International Airport
- Destination: Moscow-Vnukovo Airport
- Occupants: 109
- Passengers: 101
- Crew: 8
- Fatalities: 109
- Survivors: 0

Aeroflot Flight 1036 (Russian: Рейс 1036 Аэрофлота Рейс 1036 Aeroflota) was a domestic scheduled passenger flight operated by Aeroflot, that crashed during takeoff from Sochi International Airport on 1 October 1972. All 109 people (Note: Both the date of occurrence and the number of fatalities are discrepant, though it is believed it took place on 2 October with a claimed death toll of 100.) aboard the Ilyushin Il-18V perished in the crash. It is the second worst accident involving an Ilyushin Il-18 and it was the worst accident involving one at the time.

== Aircraft ==
The aircraft involved in the accident was an Ilyushin Il-18V with four Ivchenko AI-20K engines, registered CCCP-75507 to Aeroflot. The aircraft rolled off the assembly line on 3 August 1963. At the time of the accident, the aircraft had a total of 15,700 flight hours and 7,900 pressurization cycles.

== Crew ==
There were eight crew members aboard the fatal flight. The cockpit crew consisted of:

- Captain V. G. Tikhonov, (В. Г. Тихонов)
- Copilot V. A. Slobodskaya (В. А. Слободская)
- Navigator A. S. Zmeevsky (А. С. Змеевский)
- Flight engineer V. V. Meshchaninov (В. В. Мещанинов)
- Radio operator B. V. Spelov (Б. В. Спелов)

== Synopsis ==
Flight 1036 crashed during the initial climb phase of takeoff from the Sochi-Moscow route. On the flight were 100 adult passengers, one child, and eight crew members. Psychologist Vladimir Nebylitsyn and his wife were among the passengers of Flight 1036. The weather of the day of the accident was clear, with visibility over 5 kilometers, mild winds, and an air temperature of 17 °C(62.6 F).

At 19:21(7:21 PM) local time, the Il-18 departed from Sochi Airport at a bearing of 240°. At 19:22(7:22 PM), the flight crew contacted air traffic control for further instructions. The air traffic controller instructed the flight to make a right turn with a climb of up to 3000 meters(9800 Ft.) to Lazarevskoye; the crew of the Ilyushin Il-18 confirmed hearing the instructions. At an altitude of 150–250 meters(490-650 Ft.), the pilots began to perform the right turn when the aircraft unexpectedly veered into a steep left turn with a sharp nosedive, and then crashed into the Black Sea.

At 19:40(7:40 PM), air traffic control received a message from warships in the area that a plane had crashed, describing the route; witnesses reported the aircraft turned onto a bearing of 220°, about 10.5 km from the shore before it veered off and crashed. At 23:52(11:52 PM) about 5-6 kilometers from the shore, debris from the aircraft and fragments of bodies were found floating on the surface of the sea. All 109 people aboard the airliner died.

== Causes ==
Investigators proposed several hypotheses for the cause of the accident. No traces of explosives were found on any wreckage or human remains. Mechanical failure was also suggested but not able to be proven beyond reasonable doubt. The most investigated hypothesis was the possibility of bird strikes damaging the aircraft, specifically by migrating birds. Due to the aircraft crashing into the Black Sea to a depth of 500–1,000 m (1,600–3,300 ft) and into the mud, which limited the investigation, it was impossible to determine for certain the cause or causes of the crash.
