= Robert Plomin =

American psychologist and geneticist

Robert Plomin CBE FBA
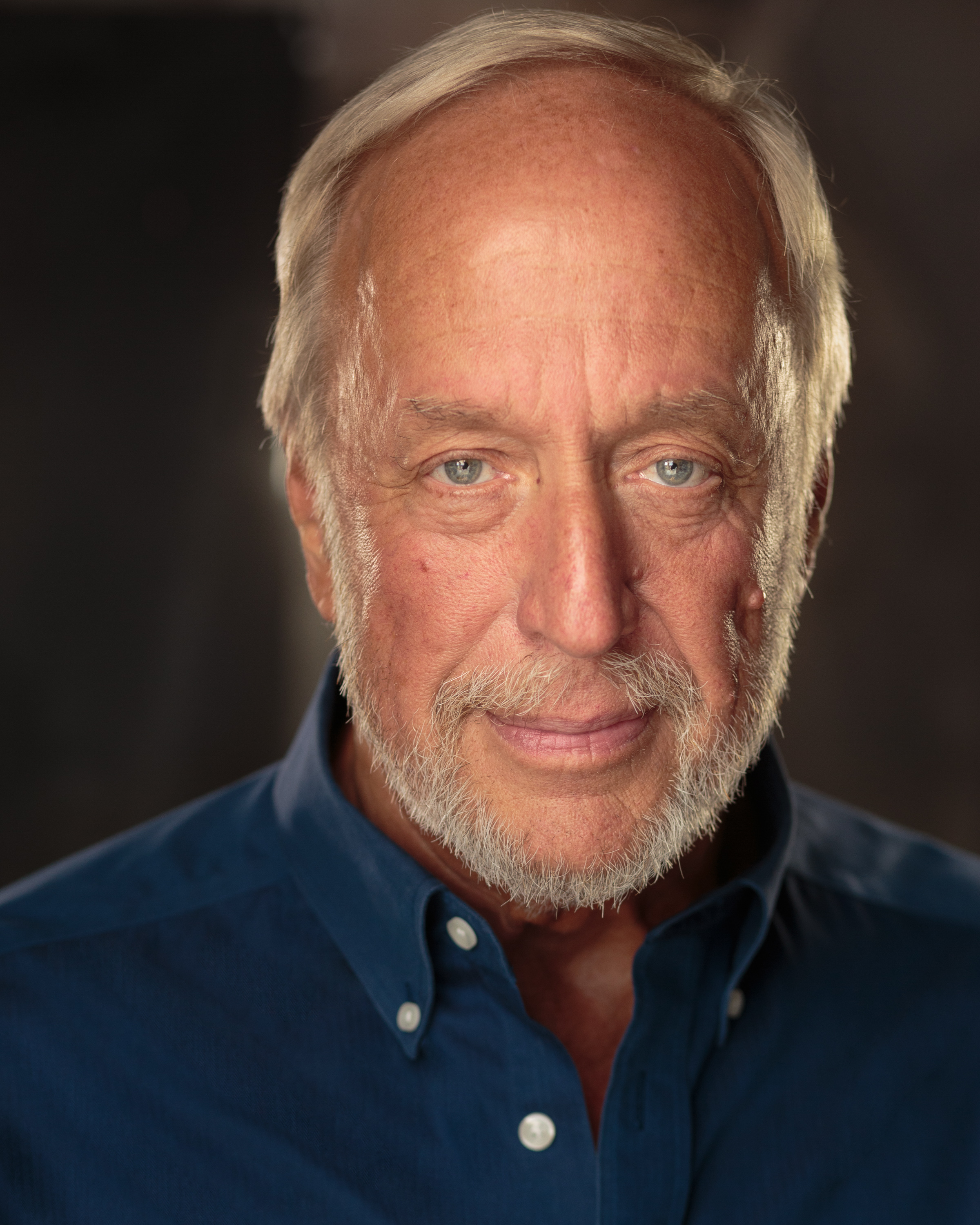
- Plomin in 2018
- Born: Robert Plomin; 1948 (age 77–78); Chicago, Illinois, U.S.
- Citizenship: American; British
- Education: DePaul University (BA); University of Texas at Austin (PhD)
- Known for: Twins Early Development Study
- Spouse: Judith Dunn
- Awards: Dobzhansky Memorial Award (2002; Behavior Genetics Association), William James Fellow Award (2004; Association for Psychological Science), Lifetime Achievement Award (2011; International Society for Intelligence Research)
- Scientific career
- Fields: Psychology, behavioral genetics
- Workplaces: University of Colorado at Boulder, Pennsylvania State University, King's College London
- Doctoral advisor: Arnold H. Buss
- Website: www.kcl.ac.uk/people/robert-plomin

Robert Plomin (born February 20, 1948) is an American-British psychologist and geneticist best known for his research in behavioral genetics and the genetic basis of cognitive abilities, personality, and mental health. Since 1994, he has been a Research Professor at the Social, Genetic and Developmental Psychiatry Centre (SGDP), a department in the Institute of Psychiatry, Psychology and Neuroscience at King’s College London. Plomin is widely recognized as an influential figure in behavioral science, particularly for his leadership in the Twins Early Development Study (TEDS) and for advancing the use of molecular genetics in psychology. A Review of General Psychology survey, published in 2002, ranked Plomin as the 71st most cited psychologist of the 20th century. He is the author of several books on genetics and psychology.

== Early life and education ==
Plomin was born in Chicago to a family of Polish-German extraction. In a 2014 interview with The Guardian, he recalled being suspended temporarily from elementary school for arguing about evolution with a teacher, an experience he said pushed him toward a scientific worldview and away from religion.

He graduated high school from DePaul University Academy in Chicago, he then earned a B.A. in psychology from DePaul University in 1970 and a Ph.D. in psychology in 1974 from the University of Texas at Austin under personality psychologist Arnold H. Buss.

== Career ==
Plomin began his academic career at the University of Colorado Boulder, where he was a faculty member at the Institute for Behavioral Genetics and in the Department of Psychology from 1974 to 1986.

From 1986 to 1994, Plomin served as Professor of Human Development at Pennsylvania State University, where he directed the Center for Developmental and Health Genetics and participated in the Intercollege Graduate Program in Genetics. In 1994, he was named an Evan Pugh Professor, the highest honor given to faculty at Penn State.

In 1994, Plomin relocated to the United Kingdom and joined King’s College London as an MRC Research Professor in Behavioral Genetics. He founded the Social, Genetic and Developmental Psychiatry Centre (SGDP) at the Institute of Psychiatry, Psychology & Neuroscience. He served as Deputy Director (1994–2007), Director (2007–2010), and again as Deputy Director (2010–2020) of the Centre.

At King’s College, Plomin led the Twins Early Development Study (TEDS), a longitudinal project following over 15,000 pairs of twins born in the UK between 1994 and 1996. TEDS has been funded for a record 30 years by the UK Medical Research Council.

== Research ==
Two of Plomin’s highly cited papers used genetic research to uncover novel discoveries about the environment. The first was a 1987 paper with Denise Daniels, which summarized evidence that psychologically relevant environmental influences make children in a family different from, not similar to, one another. These influences, called nonshared environment are in contrast to nurture, the assumption that shared family factors such as parenting are responsible for developmental outcomes.

The second paper, published in 1991 with Cindy Bergeman, reviewed research that revealed substantial genetic influence on environmental measures widely used in psychology, which opened up a new known as the nature of nurture. Genetic factors impact so-called environmental measures like parenting, life events and social support because they are not measures of the environment ‘out there’ independent of people. Instead, such environmental measures involve what geneticists call genotype-environment correlation, in which people select, modify and create experiences correlated with their genetic propensities.

=== Generalist Genes Hypothesis ===
Together with Yulia Kovas and others, Plomin developed the Generalist Genes Hypothesis, which suggests that many of the same genes are involved across a range of cognitive abilities and learning disabilities. This insight challenged the traditional view of distinct, domain-specific genetic pathways and has had a profound influence on educational psychology and the understanding of neurodevelopmental disorders.

=== Polygenic Scores and Blueprint ===
Plomin has advocated incorporating molecular genetics into psychology, using genome-wide association studies to study how polygenic scores relate to behavioral and cognitive differences. His 2018 book Blueprint: How DNA Makes Us Who We Are argues that inherited DNA is a major influence on individual traits and has received both praise and criticism, including concerns about genetic determinism.

== Honors and awards ==
In 2002, the Behavior Genetics Association awarded him the Dobzhansky Memorial Award for a Lifetime of Outstanding Scholarship in Behavior Genetics. He was awarded the William James Fellow Award by the Association for Psychological Science in 2004 and the 2011 Lifetime Achievement Award of the International Society for Intelligence Research. In 2017, Plomin received the APA Award for Distinguished Scientific Contributions. Plomin has been ranked among the 100 most eminent psychologists of the 20th Century. In 2002, he was elected a Fellow of the Academy of Medical Sciences and in 2005, he was elected a Fellow of the British Academy (FBA), the United Kingdom's national academy for humanities and social sciences.

Plomin was appointed Commander of the Order of the British Empire (CBE) in the 2023 New Year Honours for services to scientific research.

== Personal life ==
In 1987 Plomin married Judith Dunn, a British psychologist and academic.

== Bibliography ==
- Behavioral Genetics: A Primer, together with John C. DeFries, Gerald E. McClearn, WH Freeman & Co, 1989, ISBN 978-0-7167-2056-0
- Separate Lives: Why Siblings Are So Different, together with Judy Dunn, Basic Books, 1992, ISBN 978-0-465-07689-5
- Behavioral Genetics in the Postgenomic Era, together with John C. DeFries, Peter McGuffin, Ian W. Craig, American Psychological Association, 2002, ISBN 978-1-55798-926-0
- The Relationship Code: Deciphering Genetic and Social Influences on Adolescent Development (Adolescent Lives), together with David Reiss, Jenae M. Neiderhiser, E. Mavis Hetherington, Harvard University Press, 2003, ISBN 978-0-674-01126-7
- Nature, Nurture, and the Transition to Early Adolescence, together with John C. DeFries, Stephen A. Petrill, John K. Hewitt, Oxford University Press, 2003, ISBN 978-0-19-515747-5
- Nature And Nurture: An Introduction To Human Behavioral Genetics, Wadsworth Publishing, 2004, ISBN 978-0-534-65112-1
- Nature and Nurture during Infancy and Early Childhood, together with John C. DeFries, David Fulker, Cambridge University Press, 2006, ISBN 978-0-521-03424-1
- Behavioral Genetics, together with John C. DeFries, Peter McGuffin, Gerald E. McClearn, Worth Publishers; 5th edition, 2008, ISBN 978-1-4292-0577-1
- Behavioral Genetics, together with John C. DeFries, Valerie S Knopik, Jenae M. Neiderhiser, Worth Publishers; 6th edition, 2012, ISBN 978-1-4292-4215-8
- G Is for Genes, together with Kathryn Ashbury, Wiley Blackwell; 2013, ISBN 978-1-118-48281-0
- Behavioral Genetics, together with John C. DeFries, Valerie S Knopik, Jenae M. Neiderhiser, Worth Publishers; 7th edition, 2016, ISBN 978-1-4641-7605-0
- Blueprint: How DNA Makes Us Who We Are, Penguin Books Ltd., 2018, ISBN 978-0-241-28207-6
