= Twins Early Development Study =

Ongoing longitudinal twin study

The Twins Early Development Study (TEDS) is an ongoing longitudinal twin study based at King's College London. The main goal of TEDS is to use behavioural genetic methods to find out how nature (genes) and nurture (environments) can explain why people differ with respect to their cognitive abilities, learning abilities and behaviours. The study was founded by Robert Plomin in 1994, and it includes participants from over 15,000 families. The original participants were identified from birth records among the set of twins born in the United Kingdom from 1994 to 1996. They were first assessed at the age of two and regularly re-assessed thereafter.

In 2021, Thalia Eley took over the study with Plomin stepping down as director. The goals of the next phase of the TEDS study will focus on the Children of the TEDS Group (CoTEDS) and will explore Eley's own research area on mental health.
