= Boris Teplov =

Russian psychologist

Boris Mikhailovich Teplov (Russian: Борис Михайлович Теплов; 21 October [O.S. 9 October] 1896, in Tula, Russia – 28 September 1965, in Moscow) was a Soviet psychologist who studied problems of inborn individual differences and talents (e.g. musical talents, warlord talents etc.) and a founder of a Soviet psychological school of Differential psychology. His well-known opponent was Aleksey Leontyev who believed that people's talents are not inborn but rather determined by education and other external influence. Boris Teplov was editor-in-chief of the principal Russian journal on psychology Voprosy Psikhologii.
