= Arnold H. Buss =

American psychologist (1924–2021)

- Born: August 7, 1924; Brooklyn, New York, U.S.
- Died: June 26, 2021 (aged 96); West Orange, New Jersey
- Education: New York University; Indiana University Bloomington
- Children: David M. Buss; Laura Buss; Arnold Buss Jr.
- Scientific career
- Fields: Personality psychology
- Institutions: University of Texas at Austin
- Doctoral students: Robert Plomin

Arnold Herbert Buss (August 7, 1924 – June 26, 2021) was a professor emeritus of psychology at the University of Texas at Austin known for his work in aggression, temperament, self-consciousness and shyness.

== Career ==
Buss received his B.A. from New York University in 1947 after serving as a medic in the United States Army during World War II and received his Ph.D. from Indiana University Bloomington in 1952. He worked as a lecturer at the University of Iowa from 1951 to 1952 and then served as the Chief Psychologist at Larue D. Carter Memorial Hospital from 1952 to 1957. He was a professor at the University of Pittsburgh from 1957 to 1965 and a professor at Rutgers University from 1965 to 1969. He joined the faculty of the University of Texas at Austin in 1969 as a full professor and would retire in 2008.

== Works ==
=== Books ===
- Buss, Arnold (1961). The Psychology of Aggression. New York: Wiley.
- Buss, Arnold (1966). Psychopathology. New York: Wiley. ISBN 9780471126423.
- Buss, Arnold (1969). Theories of Schizophrenia. New York: Wiley.
- Buss, Arnold (1973). Psychology - Man in Perspective. New York: Wiley.
- Buss, Arnold; Plomin, Robert (1975). A Temperament Theory of Personality Development. New York: Wiley-Interscience.
- Buss, Arnold (1978). Psychology - Behavior in Perspective. New York: Wiley. ISBN 9780471126461.
- Buss, Arnold (1980). Self-Consciousness and Social Anxiety. San Francisco, California: Freeman.
- Buss, Arnold; Plomin, Robert (1984). Temperament: Early Developing Personality Traits. Hillsdale, New Jersey: Erlbaum.
- Buss, Arnold (1986). Social Behavior and Personality. Hillsdale, New Jersey: Erlbaum.
- Buss, Arnold (1988). Personality: Evolutionary Heritage and Human Distinctiveness. Hillsdale, New Jersey: Erlbaum.
- Buss, Arnold (1995). Personality: Temperament, Social Behavior and the Self. Needham Heights, Massachusetts: Allyn & Bacon.
- Buss, Arnold (2001). Psychological Dimensions of the Self. Thousand Oaks, California: Sage.
- Buss, Arnold (2008). Personality Match and Mismatch in the Family. Austin, Texas: Bussbooks.
- Buss, Arnold (2011). Pathways to Individuality: Evolution and Development of Personality Traits. Washington, D.C.: American Psychological Association.
