= Stephen Petrill =

Psychologist

Stephen Petrill is an American psychologist.

== Biography ==
Petrill obtained his bachelor's degree in psychology from the University of Notre Dame in 1990 and got his Ph.D. in the same field five years later at the Case Western Reserve University. Two years later he started working at the Developmental Psychiatry Research Centre in London and then worked at Wesleyan University until 2001. Since that year he worked at the Penn State University until 2006 and then had a job at the Ohio State University where he still works. Currently he is also an editor of Journal of Child Psychology and Psychiatry and prior to it was chairman of the Behavioral Genetic and Epidemiology Study Section at National Institutes of Health. He also serves as a member of the Basic Processes Review Panel at the Institute for Education Sciences and was an author of numerous peer-reviewed papers relating to his studies which brought him an h-index of 35. In 2012 he became a director and principal investigator and became a leader of various teams from such universities as University of Colorado, Florida State, Vanderbilt, Houston, and Free University Amsterdam with a goal to construct the Learning Disabilities Innovation Hub on a grant of $2,394,311 which was awarded to him by the Eunice Kennedy Shriver National Institute of Child Health and Human Development. On it he is working with John Opfer, an associate professor of psychology from Center for Cognitive and Behavioral Brain Imaging and Zhong-lin Lu a professor of psychology and director.
