= Jan Strelau =

Polish psychologist (1931–2020)

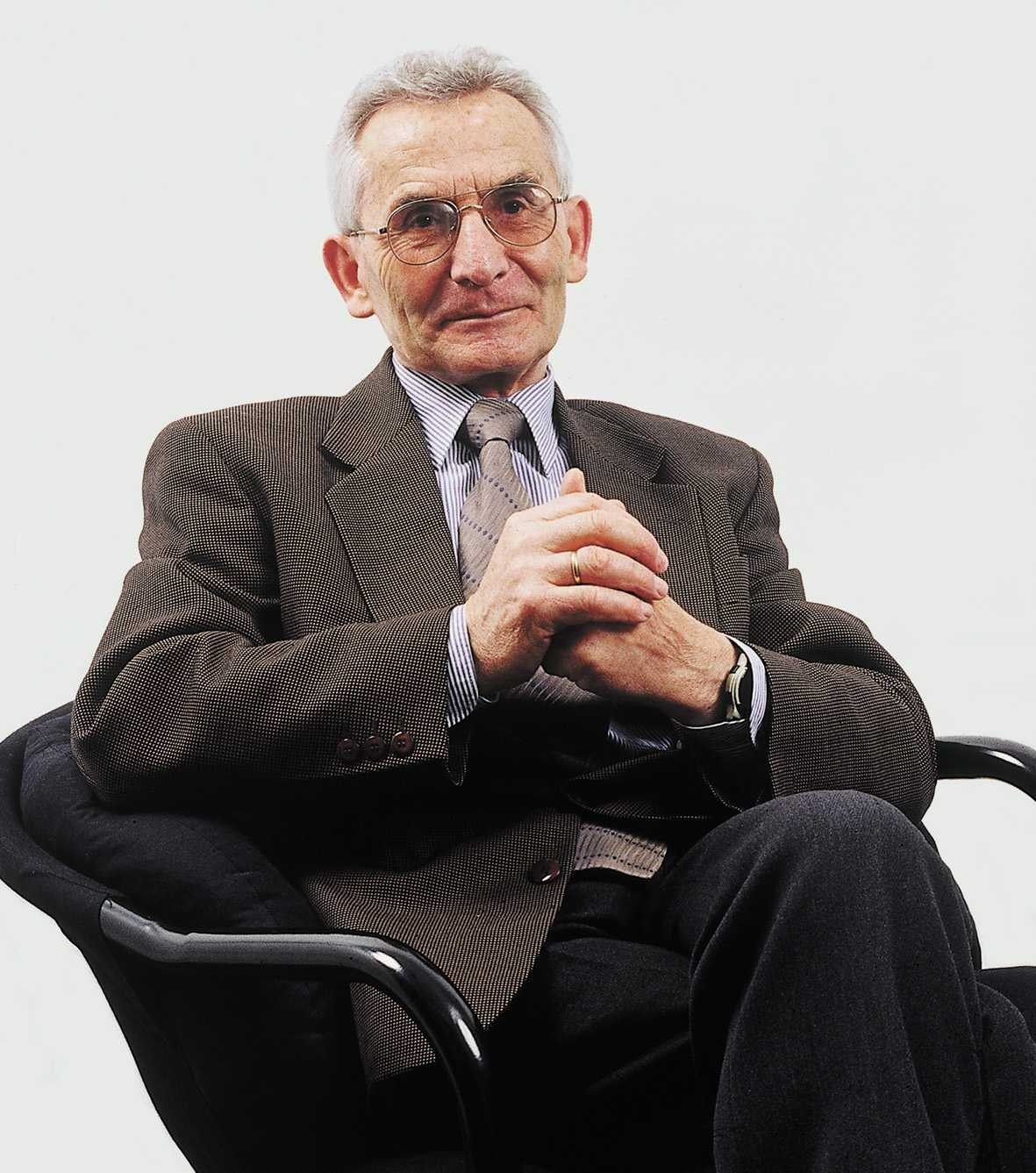
Jan Strelau

Jan Strelau (30 May 1931 in Gdańsk – 4 August 2020 in Warsaw) was a Polish psychologist best known for his studies on temperament. He was professor of psychology at Warsaw University from 1968 to 2001 and was since 2001 professor at Warsaw School of Social Sciences and Humanities, where he took the positions of Vice-rector for Research and International Affairs (2002–2010), Vice-rector for Research (2010–2012), and the Chairman of the Board of Trustees (2012–2016).

== Research ==
His research concentrated for several decades on temperament and its functional significance in human adaptation, especially under extreme conditions (stressors) and as a factor influencing behavior disorders. He transferred Ivan Pavlov’s concepts of higher nervous system properties such as strength of excitation, strength of inhibition and mobility of nervous processes into psychological constructs (traits) to be measured since the 1970s by the Strelau Temperament Inventory (STI) and beginning from 1999 by the Pavlovian Temperament Survey (PTS) – an inventory constructed by Strelau, Angleitner and Newberry. Both inventories have been adapted to over a dozen language versions.

Strelau, in cooperation with Alois Angleitner from Bielefeld University, was the first researcher who introduced behavior genetic studies in Poland, extended during the last decade by one of his disciples, Włodzimierz Oniszczenko, and by Wojciech Dragan to molecular genetics centered on studying the genetic background of temperament traits as defined by RTT.

Strelau was the founder and head of the Department of Psychology of Individual Differences and of the Interdisciplinary Center for Behavior-Genetic Research at Warsaw University. He has been first president of the European Association of Personality Psychology and president of the International Society for the Study of Individual Differences. He was Vice-president of the International Union of Psychological Science.

Strelau was born in the Free City of Danzig, now Gdańsk. He was a member of the Polish Academy of Sciences, Academia Europaea and foreign member of the Finnish Academy of Sciences. He gained honorary degrees (Dr.h.c.) of University of Gdańsk, University of Poznań and State University of Humanistic Sciences in Moscow. In 2000 he was awarded the Prize of the Foundation for Polish Science (regarded as the “Polish Nobel Prize”). In 2011, he received the Commander's Cross of the Order of Polonia Restituta.

He died in Warsaw, aged 89.

== Writing ==
Strelau was the author of the Regulative Theory of Temperament (RTT) that concentrates on formal aspects of behavior, comprising energetic and temporal characteristics composed of such traits as: sensory sensitivity, emotional reactivity, endurance and activity (energetic aspect), briskness and perseverance (temporal combustion). The Formal Characteristics of Behavior – Temperament Inventory (FCB-TI), developed by Strelau and Bogdan Zawadzki and adapted to many language versions allows for measuring these traits. A lot of empirical evidence has been collected by Strelau and his collaborators demonstrating that heritability explains about 40 percent of the variance in RTT temperament traits. In many studies, conducted among others on victims of disasters and catastrophes it came out that such traits as emotional reactivity, perseverance and activity are significant moderators of psychological consequences (e.g. PTSD) of experienced trauma.

Jan Strelau published about 250 scientific articles in the field of psychology of individual differences and was author or editor of 44 books.

== Selected publications ==
- Temperament, personality, activity (1983)
- Temperament: A psychological perspective (1998)
- The Pavlovian Temperament Survey (PTS): An international handbook (1999) with A. Angleitner and B. H. Newberry
- Temperament as a regulator of behavior: After fifty years of research (2008)
- Temperamental bases of behavior: Warsaw studies on individual differences (1985) editor
- The biological bases of personality and behavior: Theories, measurement techniques, and development, vol. 1 (1985) editor, with F. H. Farley and A. Gale
- The biological bases of personality and behavior: Psychophysiology, performance, and application, vol. 2 (1986) editor, with F. H. Farley and A. Gale
- Personality dimensions and arousal (1987) editor, with H. J. Eysenck
- Explorations in temperament: International perspectives on theory and measurement (1991) editor, with A. Angleitner
- People under extreme stress: An individual differences approach (2006) editor, with T. Klonowicz
- Temperament as a regulator of behavior: After fifty years of research (2008) Clinton Corners, NY: Eliot Werner Publications.
