= Vladimir Nebylitsyn =

Russian psychologist

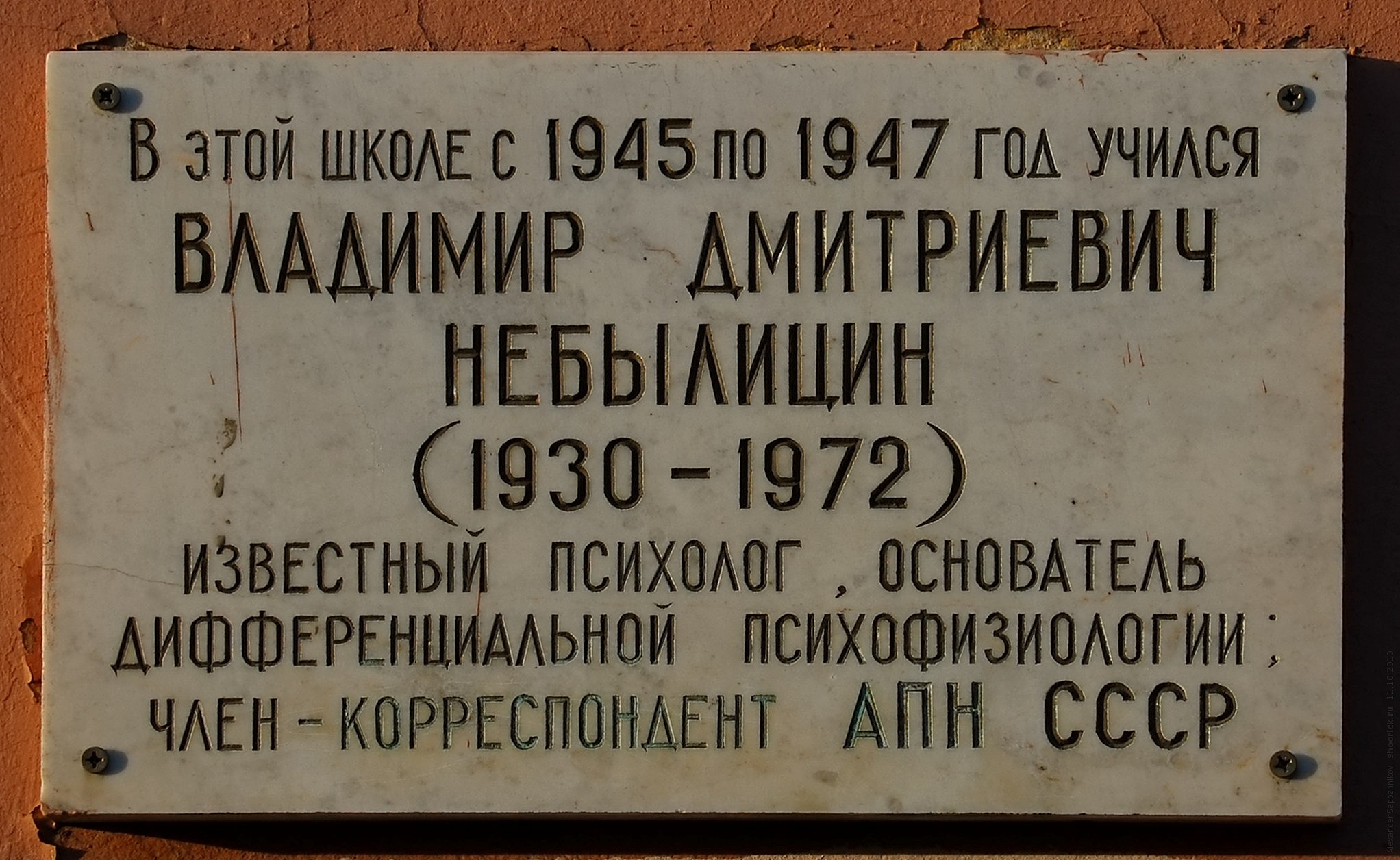
Memorial tablet on the wall of school number 121 in Chelyabinsk, Russia. Text: Vladimir Dmitrievich Nebylitsin (1930–1972), famous psychologist, founder of differential psychophysiology, corresponding member of Academy of Pedagogical Sciences of USSR learned in this school in 1945–1947

Vladimir Dmitrievich Nebylitsyn, Russian: Владимир Дмитриевич Небылицын (1930, Chelyabinsk region — 1 October 1972, near Adler) was a Soviet psychologist, one of Boris Teplov's disciples, professor (1968), associate member of the Russian Academy of Pedagogy.

Based on Teplov's researches, he studied problems of experimental neuroscience. He managed to substantiate Teplov's hypothesis of inverse dependency between the strength of the nervous system and sensibility. He described some previously unknown characteristics of the nervous system, such as dynamicism, developed several electro-physiological methods of research of dynamics of brain processes. Nebylitsyn advanced a hypothesis on general characteristics of the nervous system underlying such personal characteristics as activity and self-regulation. In Soviet psychology he was a pioneer of the factor analysis.

He died in the crash of Aeroflot Flight 1036 with his wife.

His brother Boris Nebylitsyn taught at Chelyabinsk State University.

== Works ==
- Основные свойства нервной системы человека. 1966 (Main Characteristics of the Nervous System);
- Психофизиологические исследования индивидуальных различий. 1976 (Psychophysiological Research of Individual Differences).
- Teplov, B.M. & Nebylitsyn, V.D. (1963) Experimental study of properties of the nervous system in man. Journal of Highest Nervous Activity, 13: 789–797.
- Gray, J. A. (1964) Pavlov's typology. Oxford: Pergamon Press.
- Nebylitsyn, V. D. (1972) Fundamental properties of the human nervous system. NY: Plenum.
- Mecacci, L. & Brozek, J., Eds. (1973) Soviet psychophysiology. Soviet Psychology, 11 (no. 3) (special issue).
- Mecacci, L. (1976) Trends in the psychophysiology of individual differences. The Pavlovian Journal of Biological Science, 11: 93–104.
- Mecacci, L. (1987) Basic properties of the nervous system and arousal model in the light of current neurophysiology. In J. Strelau and H. J. Eysenck (eds.), Personality dimensions and arousal (pp. 171–182). NY: Plenum Press.
