= Grigory Teplov =

Russian statesman, philosopher, poet, and composer (1717–1779)

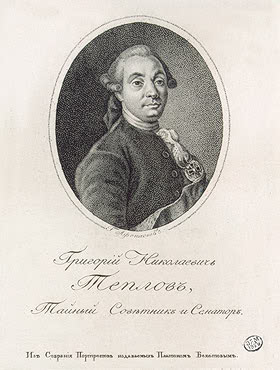
Portrait, early 19th century

Grigory Nikolayevich Teplov (Russian: Григорий Николаевич Теплов; 20 November 1717 in Pskov, Russia – 30 March 1779 in Saint Petersburg, Russia) was a Russian philosopher, composer, historian and academic administrator of lowly birth who managed the St. Petersburg Academy of Sciences. He also wielded influence over Little Russia in his capacity as secretary and advisor to Kirill Razumovsky (whose cousin he married). He was also an amateur musician and in 1751 printed a collection of his songs entitled Idle Hours Away from Work.

== Biography ==
Teplov was educated at Feofan Prokopovich's school in St. Petersburg and in Göttingen, Germany. On his return to Russia, Aleksey Razumovsky, the secret spouse of Empress Elisabeth, asked him to look after his junior brother Kirill. After Kirill turned 18, he was appointed President of the Academy of Sciences. It was Teplov who ran the institution on his behalf. He published a Russian translation of Christian Wolff's writings, quarrelled with Mikhail Lomonosov, persecuted Gerhardt Friedrich Müller for his Normanist theories, and publicly berated Vasily Trediakovsky. He developed a keen interest in the history of Ukraine, amassing many documents on the subject.

Peter III of Russia had Teplov arrested for obscure reasons but he was released shortly thereafter. The event pushed him towards the party of Empress Catherine and the Orlov brothers. Teplov contributed to the downfall of the emperor and was present at his murder in the Ropsha Palace. It was Teplov who drafted Catherine's first ukases and persuaded her to abolish the Cossack Hetmanate. Mindful of Chancellor Bestuzhev's advice, Catherine bestowed upon him the title of senator but effectively removed him from power. Giacomo Casanova describes him as the man "whose vice was that he loved boys, and his virtue that he had strangled Peter III".
