= Sensation seeking =

Personality trait

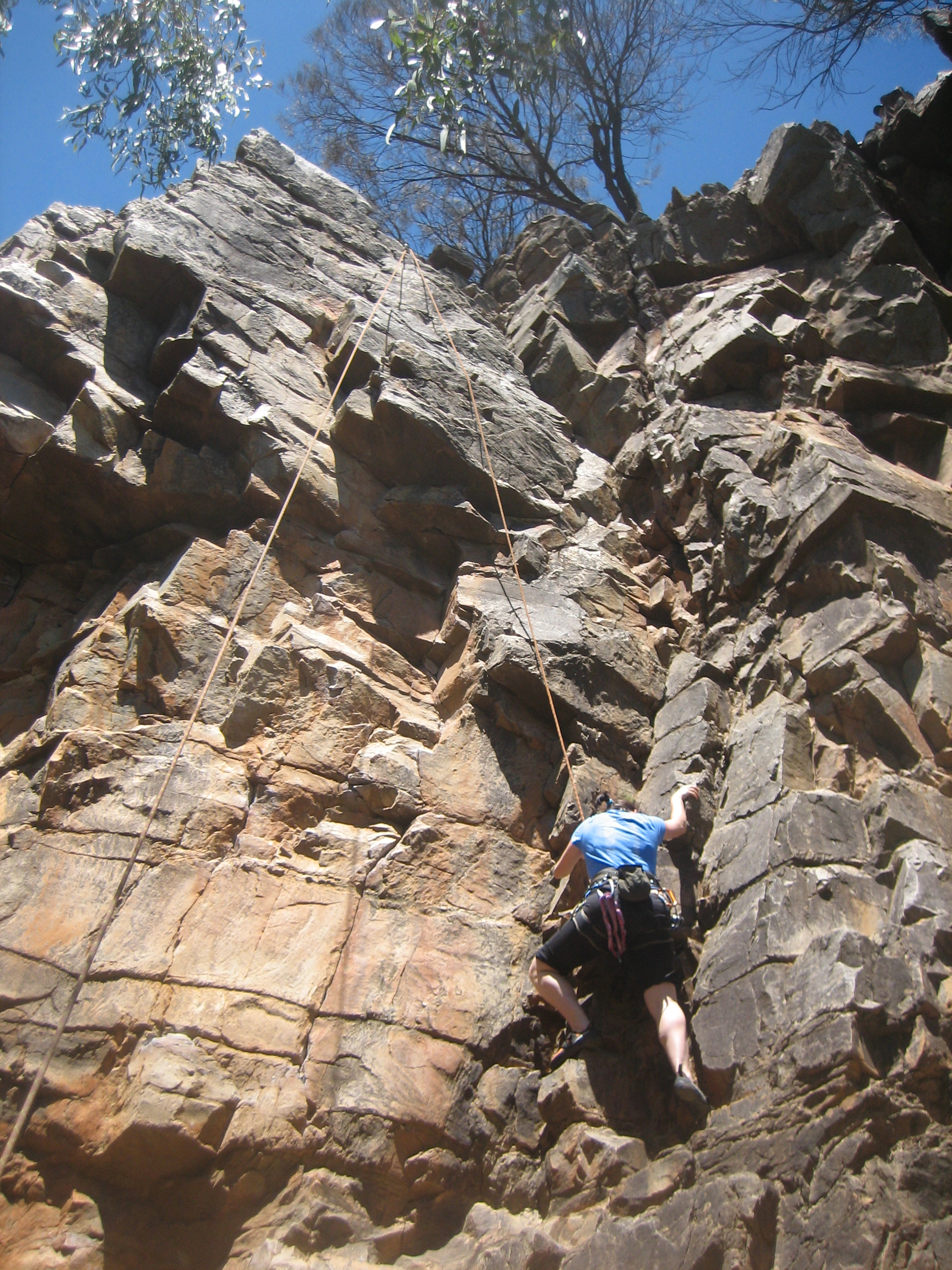
People high in the sensation seeking personality trait may crave outdoor activities involving unusual sensations and risks, such as rock climbing.

Sensation seeking is a personality trait defined by the search for experiences and feelings, that are "varied, novel, rich and intense", and by the readiness to "take physical, social, legal, and financial risks for the sake of such experiences." Risk is not an essential part of the trait, as many activities associated with it are not risky. However, risk may be ignored, tolerated, or minimized and may even be considered to add to the excitement of the activity. The concept was developed by Marvin Zuckerman of the University of Delaware. In order to assess this trait he created a personality test called the Sensation Seeking Scale. This test assesses individual differences in terms of sensory stimulation preferences. So there are people who prefer a strong stimulation and display a behavior that manifests a greater desire for sensations and there are those who prefer a low sensory stimulation. The scale is a questionnaire designed to measure how much stimulation a person requires and the extent to which they enjoy the excitement. Zuckerman hypothesized that people who are high sensation seekers require a lot of stimulation to reach their Optimal Level of Arousal. When the stimulation or sensory input is not met, the person finds the experience unpleasant.

== Components ==
Sensation seeking can be divided into four traits:

- Thrill- and adventure-seeking: Desire for outdoor activities involving unusual sensations and risks, such as skydiving, scuba diving, high-speed driving and flying.
- Experience-seeking: Referring to new sensory or mental experiences through unconventional choices, also including psychedelic experiences, social nonconformity and desire to associate with unconventional people.
- Disinhibition: Preference of "out of control" activities such as wild parties, drinking and illegal activities
- Boredom susceptibility: intolerance of repetition or boring people, and restlessness in such conditions.

The most recent version of the Sensation Seeking Scale (SSS-V) has demonstrated moderate validity and reliability. It has been adapted for use with children.

== Relationship to personality models ==
Zuckerman began researching the personality trait he came to call "sensation seeking" in 1969. Zuckerman argues that sensation seeking is one of a handful of "core traits" that can be used to describe human personality. Although other researchers including Eysenck, and Costa and McCrae considered the trait to be related to extraversion, factor-analytic studies conducted by Zuckerman suggested that sensation seeking is relatively independent of other major dimensions of personality. A number of studies have found positive correlations between sensation seeking, especially the experience seeking component, and openness to experience. Additionally, negative correlations have been found between agreeableness from the NEO-PI-R and total sensation seeking, and the boredom susceptibility and disinhibition subscales. The honesty-humility factor of the HEXACO model has been shown to be negatively correlated with sensation seeking and risk taking behaviors.

In Zuckerman's alternative five model of personality, sensation seeking has been incorporated as a facet of the broader trait of impulsive sensation seeking. Within Eysenck's "Big Three" model of personality, impulsive sensation seeking is most strongly related to psychoticism and within the Big Five personality traits it is primarily related to (low) conscientiousness. Sensation seeking has a strong correlation with the novelty seeking scale of Cloninger's Temperament and Character Inventory. Furthermore, he presents evidence that this characteristic is influenced by genes. So, sensation seeking parents are likely to have sensation seeking children.

== Features ==
Zuckerman's research has found that high sensation seekers tend to seek high levels of stimulation in their daily lives. The scale predicts how well people tolerate sensory deprivation sessions. Sensation seeking increases with age from childhood to adolescence. Studies indicate it increases between 10-15 years and remains stable or declines thereafter. However, boredom susceptibility remains stable across the life span, unlike the other facets of sensation seeking.

Substantial gender differences have been found in sensation seeking, with males scoring significantly higher than females. In American samples, males significantly outscored females in total sensation seeking, thrill and adventure seeking, boredom susceptibility, and disinhibition. Studies in Australia, Canada, and Spain found similar gender differences in total sensation seeking, thrill and adventure seeking and boredom susceptibility.

Marital status is also related to sensation seeking, as studies have found that divorced males tend to be higher in the trait compared to single or married men.

=== Behaviour ===
Sensation seeking is related to driving speed, with both males and females high in sensation seeking more likely to engage in speeding. High sensation seekers are more likely to ignore traffic rules and engage in high-risk behaviours associated with accidents and/or crashes resulting in driver injuries. Self esteem and risk perception are also variables that affect sensation seeking and risky driving.

Alcohol use has been linked to sensation seeking, especially the disinhibition and experience seeking subscales. Peer influences and sensation seeking appear to mutually reinforce each other in their influence on substance use. Research has found that peer sensation seeking levels are predictive of drug use. Furthermore, individuals are likely to associate with peers whose sensation seeking levels are similar to their own, further influencing drug and alcohol use. In addition, marijuana, psychostimulants (such as methamphetamines) and hallucinogenic drugs are also associated with experience and sensation seeking.

High sensation seekers tend to engage in high-risk sexual behavior such as having multiple sexual partners, and failing to use condoms to protect themselves against disease. They also tend to have permissive sexual attitudes. Risky sexual behaviour is particularly related to the disinhibition facet of sensation seeking. High sensation seekers are also more likely to be unfaithful to partners whilst in a committed romantic relationship.

High sensation seekers prefer listening to arousing music such as hard rock rather than classical instrumental. High sensation seekers are also more likely to enjoy surreal paintings over representational ones or unpleasant art forms (defined as presence of violent or aggressive content or themes of death and despair).

Traditional masculinity, peer pressure, sensation seeking, and risky behavior are all elements that correlate with each other. Research found that male undergraduate students conforming to traditional masculinity were more likely to involve themselves with higher levels of sensation seeking and risky behavior compared to females.

=== Occupational choices ===
Sensation seekers tend to prefer occupations involving novel, stimulating, and unconventional activities and unstructured tasks requiring flexibility, such as scientific and social service professions. Low sensation seekers tend to prefer more structured, well-defined tasks involving order and routine such as homemaking or teaching.

=== Bipolar disorder ===
Those with bipolar disorder are more likely to engage in socially risky behaviors. In addition, when comparing those with bipolar disorder and those without on the SSS-V, it was found that those with bipolar disorder score low on the thrill- and adventure-seeking scale, but high on the disinhibition scale.

== See also ==
- Extreme sport – Class of sport
- Impulsivity – Tendency to act on a whim without considering consequences
- Low arousal theory – Psychological theory
