= Differential psychology =

Branch of psychology

Differential psychology studies the ways in which individuals differ in their behavior and the processes that underlie it. It is a discipline that develops classifications (taxonomies) of psychological individual differences. This is distinguished from other aspects of psychology in that, although psychology is ostensibly a study of individuals, modern psychologists often study groups, or attempt to discover general psychological processes that apply to all individuals. This particular area of psychology was first named and still retains the name of "differential psychology" by William Stern in his 1900 book "Über Psychologie der individuellen Differenzen" (On the Psychology of Individual Differences).

While prominent psychologists, including Stern, have been widely credited for the concept of differential psychology, historical records show that it was Charles Darwin (1859) who first spurred the scientific interest in the study of individual differences. The interest was further pursued by half-cousin Francis Galton in his attempt to quantify individual differences among people.

For example, in evaluating the effectiveness of a new therapy, the mean performance of the therapy in one treatment group might be compared to the mean effectiveness of a placebo (or a well-known therapy) in a second, control group. In this context, differences between individuals in their reaction to the experimental and control manipulations are actually treated as errors rather than as interesting phenomena to study. This approach is applied because psychological research depends upon statistical controls that are only defined upon groups of people.

== Importance of individual differences ==
Importantly, individuals can also differ not only in their current state, but in the magnitude or even direction of response to a given stimulus. Such phenomena, often explained in terms of inverted-U response curves, place differential psychology at an important location in such endeavours as personalized medicine, in which diagnoses are customised for an individual's response profile.

== Areas of study ==
Individual differences research typically includes personality, temperament (neuro-chemically based behavioural traits), motivation, intelligence, ability, IQ, interests, values, self-concept, self-efficacy, and self-esteem. Although the United States has seen a decrease in individual differences research since the 1960s, researchers are found in a variety of applied and experimental fields. These fields include clinical psychology, psychophysiology, educational psychology, Industrial and organizational psychology, personality psychology, social psychology, behavioral genetics, and developmental psychology programs, in the neo-Piagetian theories of cognitive development in particular.

== Methods of research ==
To study individual differences, psychologists use a variety of methods. The method is to compare and analyze the psychology and behaviour of individuals or groups under different environmental conditions. By correlating observed psychological and behavioral differences with known accompanying environments, the relative roles of different variables in psychological and behavioral development can be probed. Psychophysiological experiments on both humans and other mammals include EEG and ERPs, PET-scans, MRI, functional MRI, neurochemistry experiments with neurotransmitter and hormonal systems, caffeine and controlled drug challenges. These methods can be used for a search of biomarkers of consistent, biologically based behavioural patterns (temperament traits and symptoms of psychiatric disorders). Other sets of methods include behavioural experiments, to see how different people behave in similar settings. Behavioural experiments are often used in personality and social psychology, and include lexical and self-report methods where people are asked to complete paper-based and computer-based forms prepared by psychologists.

== See also ==
- Temperament
- Intelligence
- Behavioral genetics
- Personality psychology
- Educational psychology
