= Eysenck =

Eysenck is a surname. Notable people with the surname include:

- Hans Eysenck (1916–1997), German-born British psychology professor
  - Eysenck Personality Questionnaire, psychological test developed by Hans Eysenck
- Michael Eysenck (born 1944), British psychology professor, son of Hans
- Sybil B. G. Eysenck (1927–2020), Austrian-born British psychologist, wife of Hans
