= Freiburger Persönlichkeitsinventar =

The Freiburger Persönlichkeitsinventar (FPI) is a psychological personality test to assess personality. The test is comparable in some aspects to MMPI and more generally to EPI or 16PF and is mainly used in German speaking countries. The FPI is primarily used in the field of clinical psychology and more generally in psychological research.

== History ==
The first version was published in 1970 and was composed of four parts: FPI-G (long version), FPI-A und FPI-B (parallel half-editions) and the short version FPI-K). Initial validation of the test used a sample of 2300 subjects. In 1983, a revised version using an expanded long form containing 138 items (up from 114 in the original FPI-A) was published and validated with a representative sample drawn from western regions of Germany. The test was re-standardized in 2001 using a sample of 3740 subjects from across post-reunification Germany; the re-standardized test controls for sex and age by placing an examinee in one of seven age- and sex-defined groups and scoring responses against sample members within the examinee's group. The test can be administered using pencil-and-paper worksheets or through a computer interface.

== Scales ==
The authors selected 10 traits which are most important in psychological research and for diagnostic purposes. Furthermore, the two basic secondary factors Extraversion and Emotionality from Hans Jürgen Eysenck were included. The answers of the 138 items are compiled into 12 scales:

1. Lebenszufriedenheit (life satisfaction)
2. Soziale Orientierung (social orientation)
3. Leistungsorientierung (achievement orientation)
4. Gehemmtheit (inhibitedness)
5. Erregbarkeit (exitability)
6. Aggressivität (aggressiveness)
7. Beanspruchung (strain)
8. Körperliche Beschwerden (physical complaints)
9. Gesundheitssorgen (health concern)
10. Offenheit (frankness)
11. Extraversion (extraversion)
12. Emotionalität (emotionality)

Background for the development of the FPI where the theoretical interests of the authors on special personality traits. The first 10 scales are neither a consequence of a preconceived personality theory nor just a result of statistical data reduction (factor analysis etc.) but based on theoretically founded personality traits. Statistitcal methods only have been used as tools to get more precise scales. The scales represent typical psychological constructs often used in self descriptions which therefore pay an important role in the assessment of human beings.

== Validity ==
There are many correlations between test scores and objectively observable measures like behaviour or socio-demographic, professional and clinical properties. On the other hand, should not be overlooked that self-descriptions and self-appraisals are open to expectations, Social desirability bias, stereotypes and other influences..

The authors Jochen Fahrenberg, Rainer Hampel and Herbert Selg have made an effort in their further work to apply evidence. The test manual contains their findings. In the course of the test construction, various quality criteria were determined, and the normalizations were repeated as quality control. The comparison of the two representative surveys of 1982 and 1999 showed that the structure of the FPI-R and test statistics, reliability coefficients, and even the standard values were highly reproducible.

The manual of the 9th Edition of the FPI-R is based on a representative sample (N=3450) and answers the general criticism of personality test, mainly on response bias, social desirability, and the questionable psychometric assumptions. The authors emphasize: Personality tests require conscious application of methods and strategies of multimodal diagnostics, i.e., safeguards and critical interpretation.

== Applications and further developments ==
The FPI-R was developed as a personality test with a mean bandwidth for various tasks of psychological diagnosis, but has an application focus in the areas of psychosomatic, psychotherapy, rehabilitation, chronic diseases and health psychology. Two areas have been expanded through scale constructions and representative normalization: the "Freiburger Beschwerdenliste" (Freiburg Disorder List) and the "Fragebogen zur Lebenszufriedenheit" (questionnaire on life satisfaction).

There are FPI-R adaptations and licensing issues in other languages.
