= John Michael Steiner =

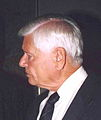
John Michael Steiner

John Michael Steiner (3 August 1925 in Prague, Czechoslovakia – 6 May 2014, Novato, California) was a Czech-born American sociologist and Holocaust researcher.

== Biography ==
John M. Steiner was the son of bank procurator Kurt J. Steiner and his wife Ilse (née von Ornstein). He was brought up as a Christian in Prague and attended an English nursery, a German primary school and the Czech Neruda Realgymnasium (grammar school). Steiner was persecuted by the National Socialist regime because his grandparents were Jewish. After the attempt on the life of deputy Reich Protector Reinhard Heydrich in 1942, Steiner was arrested and imprisoned in a series of concentration camps: in Theresienstadt, Auschwitz-Birkenau, Blechhammer, Reichenbach) and finally Dachau, where he was liberated by American troops in 1945. His mother and other family members were murdered in Auschwitz; his father survived.

After returning to Prague he was able to take his Abitur (university entrance exams) and went on to study medicine at Charles University in Prague from 1946 to 1949. He received a Jan Masaryk scholarship but came into political conflict with the new Communist regime and was temporarily imprisoned. Steiner therefore left Prague and emigrated to Australia, where he studied German philology and psychology at Melbourne University and worked as an interpreter for, and adviser to, immigrants. He graduated in 1952 with a BA. A scholarship enabled him to travel to the United States in 1952, where he earned his MA in sociology and German philology at the University of Missouri in Columbia, Missouri, in 1955. He then became an adviser in a state institution for the mentally handicapped and in the Californian prison of San Quentin. He taught at the School of Speech, University of California, Berkeley from 1956 to 1959, and became a US citizen in 1958.

In 1962 he went to Freiburg, Germany, to obtain material for his dissertation on the social structure and interpersonal relationships in National Socialist (Nazi) concentration camps. Steiner worked freelance at Freiburg's Arnold Bergstraesser Institute from 1963 to 1964 and initiated new approaches regarding the rehabilitation of criminals at Freiburg Prison using group counselling – in collaboration with the Institute for Criminology and the Institute for Psychology at Albert Ludwigs University of Freiburg. A scholarship from the Alexander von Humboldt Foundation enabled him to complete his first research project with the dissertation entitled Power Politics and Social Change in National Socialist Germany. A Process of Escalation into Mass Destruction. His Doctorate was supervised by the sociologist Emeritus Professor Eduard Baumgarten in Freiburg. Steiner was appointed Professor of Sociology at Sonoma State University, California, in 1968, where he taught until achieving Emeritus status in 1997. Subsequent research projects in Germany and Austria were financed with grants from the Fulbright Commission in 1974/1975 and the Alexander von Humboldt Foundation in 1981/1982. Steiner was awarded the German Federal Cross of Merit in 2004 in honour of his research.

== Research ==
During his research work as a sociologist and psychologist, Steiner was one of the few Holocaust survivors to seek direct contact with the perpetrators in the concentration camps. He conducted interviews with imprisoned camp guards and numerous high and lower ranked members of the SS and Waffen-SS regarding their biographies and function in the Nazi state, whereby he only revealed his identity as an Auschwitz survivor if directly asked. These interviews, for example with the "Executioner of Buchenwald" Martin Sommer, and many autobiographical texts are available as transcripts, sometimes also as videos. Some of this material can be found at the United States Holocaust Memorial Museum in Washington, DC. In various ways, Steiner gained access to other persons and contemporary witnesses, e.g. Felix Steiner and Karl Wolff – a General of the Waffen-SS and an SS Obergruppenführer (a high-ranking General) respectively – as well as Hitler's secretary Christa Schroeder and Albert Speer (Hitler's Minister of Armaments and War Production).

This research on the social psychology of the perpetrators and the topic of authoritarian personality in post-war Germany was difficult for a variety of reasons. Almost without exception, German sociologists and psychologists avoided the actually quite obvious need for empirical research on this topic which, in view of the age of those involved, was so urgent. Steiner was encouraged by Erich Fromm, who had played a major part in developing the social psychological theory of authoritarian character (authoritarian personality). He was supported by the Attorney General in Hessen Dr. Fritz Bauer, the ministry official Dr. Heinz Meyer-Velde, and the criminologist Prof. Armand Mergen. His almost-namesake Felix Steiner, a General in the Waffen-SS, and other Generals helped the "American Professor" (not knowing that he was an Auschwitz survivor) to find several hundred members of the Waffen-SS and the Wehrmacht (unified armed forces) who were willing to complete questionnaires between 1962 and 1966. "I was invited as guest of honour to an annual SS-Kameradschaftstreffen (military reunion) of 1,200 former members of the SS and their families in Nassau, Hessen, which lasted for three days. Ironically, I was asked to give a short address which, under the circumstances, was a somewhat difficult task" (written to Erich Fromm on 10 November 1975, from the Steiner estate). For his part, Steiner was an adviser of the much-discussed Stanford Prison Experiment conducted by the Californian social psychologist Philip Zimbardo. The interviews provide insights into the typical pattern of personal and familial backgrounds, into their life stories and motives for joining the SS or Waffen-SS, a Death's Head Unit (camp guard) or the Gestapo. He also found evidence showing that these organisations were relatively permeable, i.e. registrations or secondments between the organisations and affiliates were not unusual.

A second project – using questionnaires – involved a comparison of the socioeconomic data and, above all, social and political attitudes (and particularly the typical features of authoritarian personality) between members of the Waffen-SS and SS and members of the Wehrmacht. The former members of the Waffen-SS and SS differed from those of the Wehrmacht in their political convictions and value orientation. On average, they were more drawn to authority, more conformist and obedient, intolerant, narrow-minded and rigid, in certain circumstances also exhibiting latent hostility. Typical attitudes persisted even twenty years after the end of the war and about thirty years after their volunteering or recruitment, indicating relatively unchanged dispositions. These features of authoritarian personality were only determined on the level of attitudes, and need to be discussed in the context of obedient behaviour: Under what situational conditions and requirements of obedience are individual differences of authoritarian disposition evoked, so that conformity and latent hostility become manifest violence? The political reality and ideology of National Socialism systematically precipitated this escalation (see Steiner 1976, 1980, 2000).

Other work by Steiner was dedicated to "fragmentation of the conscience", i.e. the splitting of value standards between brutal violence and peaceful family life, as reported by several of the prominent perpetrators, and the impressive examples of a radical ideological change from extreme right-wing to extreme left-wing attitudes. He was moved by the existentially difficult fact that survivors in the concentration camps were detrimentally entangled in the details of what happened, sometimes only being able to survive when others died.

Steiner provided important results and insights for understanding the Nazi worldview and social psychological analysis of authoritarian personality, situational conditions and the manifestation of destructive violence. He gave numerous lectures on his explanation of the conditions and situations triggering authoritarian and destructive behaviour, as well as television and radio interviews. He wrote in newspapers and spoke at schools as a contemporary witness. He founded the Holocaust Center at Sonoma State University, California, in the United States.

== Selected publications ==
- Group Counseling im Erwachsenenvollzug (Group counselling in adult correctional institutions). In: Monatsschrift für Kriminologie und Strafrechtsreform. Vol. 49, 1966, pp. 160–172.
- Totalitarian Institutions and German Bureaucracy. In: Exerpta Criminologica. Vol. 8, 1968, pp. 295–304.
- Bureaucracy, Totalitarianism, and Political Crime. In: Essays in Honor of Armand Mergen. Kriminalistik-Verlag, Hamburg 1969, pp. 31–53.
- Power Politics and Social Change in National Socialist Germany. A Process of Escalation into Mass Destruction. Mouton, The Hague, Netherlands 1975, ISBN 90-279-7651-1.
- The SS yesterday and today: A Sociopsychological View. In: Joel E. Dimsdale (Hrsg.): Survivors, Victims, and Perpetrators: Essays on the Nazi Holocaust. Hemisphere Publishing Corporation, New York 1980, ISBN 0-89116-145-7, pp. 405–456.
- Reflections on Experiences in Nazi Death Camps. Slave Laborer at the Blechhammer (Ehrenforst) Synfuel Plant. In: Siegwald Ganglmair (Hrsg.): Dokumentationsarchiv des Österreichischen Widerstandes. Jahrbuch 1996, pp. 57–78.
- And Jobst Freiherr von Cornberg: Willkür in der Willkür: Hitler und die Befreiungen von den antisemitischen Nürnberger Gesetzen (Despotism within despotism: Hitler and exemptions from anti-Semitic Nuremberg Laws). In: Vierteljahrshefte für Zeitgeschichte. No. 2, 1998, pp. 143–187.
- And Jochen Fahrenberg: Autoritäre Einstellung und Statusmerkmale von ehemaligen Angehoerigen der Waffen-SS und SS und der Wehrmacht. Eine erweiterte Reanalyse der 1970 publizierten Untersuchung (Authoritarian attitude and socio-economic status in former members of the Waffen-SS, SS, and Wehrmacht. An extended re-analysis of the investigation published in 1970). In: Koelner Zeitschrift für Soziologie und Sozialpsychologie. Vol. 52, 2000, pp. 329–348.
- The Role Margin as the Site for Moral and Social Intelligence: The Case of Germany and National Socialism. In: Crime, Law & Social Change. Vol. 34, 2000, pp. 61–75.
- "Er war ja nicht so ...": Adolf Hitler entlässt persoenlich am 25. Januar 1942 Amalia Hoisl, Häftling Nr. 2054, aus dem Ravensbrücker Außenlager Comthurey. Interview mit Amalia Hoisl im Sommer 1997, 1998 und 1999 in Klagenfurt und Guttaring, Kärnten ("He was not like that …": Adolf Hitler himself released prisoner Amalia Hoisl from the Ravensbrueck-Comthurey external camp on January 15, 1942) In: S. Ganglmaier (Hrsg.): Dokumentationsarchiv des Oesterreichischen Widerstandes. Wien, Jahrbuch 2000, pp. 45–86.
- And Jochen Fahrenberg: Adorno und die authoritaere Persoenlichkeit (Adorno and the Authoritarian Personality). Kölner Zeitschrift für Soziologie und Sozialpsychologie, 56, 2004, pp. 127–152. PsyDok ZPID .
- Begegnungen und Erkenntnisse eines Auschwitz-Überlebenden (Confrontations and insights of an Auschwitz survivor). In: Manfred Mayer, Foerderverein Erinnerungsstätte für die Freiheitsbewegungen in der Deutschen Geschichte (Hrsg.): … und wir hoerten auf, Mensch zu sein: Der Weg nach Auschwitz, mit 170 bisher meist unveroeffentlichten Bilddokumenten aus der Sammlung Wolfgang Haney, im Auftrag des Bundesarchivs. Schoeningh, Paderborn 2005, pp. 88–91, ISBN 978-3-506-72886-9.
- Jochen und Anne Fahrenberg: Täter-Forschung nach Auschwitz. John Steiners Untersuchungen. Nachlass eines Auschwitz-Überlebenden. Pabst Science Publishers, Lengerich 2022, ISBN 978-3-95853-799-6; ISBN 978-3-95853-800-9.

== Research data (open access) ==
- John M. Steiner, Jochen Fahrenberg: Research data the study: Autoritäre Einstellungen und Statusmerkmale von ehemaligen Angehoerigen der Waffen-SS und SS und der Wehrmacht (Authoritarian attitudes in, and the socio-economic status of, former members of the Waffen-SS, SS and Wehrmacht). PsychData, Leibniz-Zentrums für Psychologische Information und Dokumentation ZPID

== Sources ==
- Interview von Wolf Schneider und Roland Rottenfußer mit Prof. Steiner: Was macht aus uns gute Menschen? (Professor Steiner interviewed by Wolf Schneider and Roland Rottenfußer: What makes someone a good person? In: connection. 2001, No. 6, pp. 38–42.
- Jochen und Anne Fahrenberg: Täter-Forschung nach Auschwitz. John M. Steiners Untersuchungen (1962 bis 2014). Dokumentationsband. 2021. PsychArchives. https://doi.org/10.23668/PSYCHARCHIVES.5158
