= Ronald Grossarth-Maticek =

German sociologist (1940–2025)

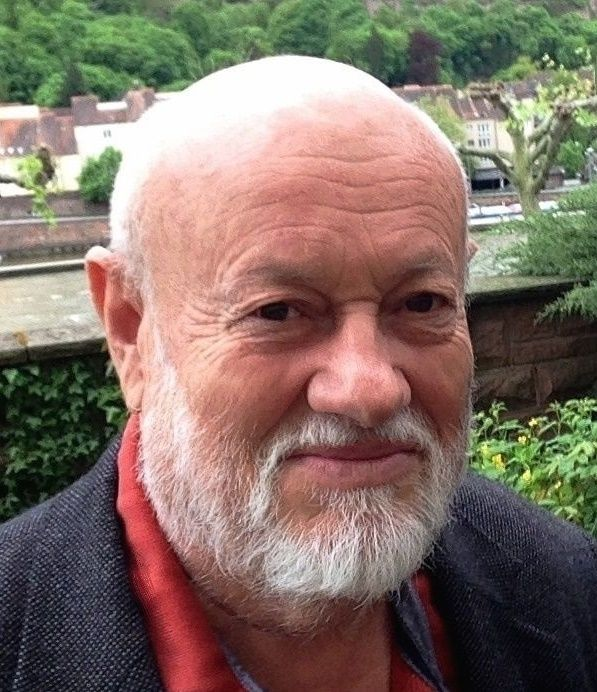
- Grossarth-Maticek in 2015
- Born: 19 June 1940; Budapest, Hungary
- Died: 16 November 2025 (aged 85); Heidelberg, Baden-Württemberg, Germany
- Occupation: Professor

Academic background
- Education: BA PhD, Dr. med. sc.
- Alma mater: University of Heidelberg, University of Belgrade.

Academic work
- Discipline: Sociologist

Ronald Grossarth-Maticek (19 June 1940 – 16 November 2025) was a German sociologist specializing in the field of medical sociology, working in the fields of psychosomatics, psycho-oncology and health promotion. He was the director of the Institute for Preventive Medicine and professor for postgraduate studies (ECPD). In 2019, some of the works of Maticek and his co-author, psychologist Hans Eysenck, were reviewed by King's College London and 26 were declared "unsafe".

== Background ==
Ronald Grossarth-Maticek was born in Budapest on 19 June 1940. In 1973, he received his PhD at the University of Heidelberg, Germany, and in 1991, a doctorate in medical sciences (Dr. med. sc.) in the medical faculty of the University of Belgrade. From 1975 to 1982, he headed the research project "Social Scientific Oncology", supported by the German Research Foundation and the Foundation for Education and Handicapped Support in Stuttgart, among others. From 1982 to 1990, he was the head of the international research program "Prospective Epidemiology and Preventive Behavioral Medicine". In 1990, he became Director of the Institute for Preventive Medicine and Political, Economic and Health Psychology in Heidelberg, an institution of the European Centre for Peace and Development (ECPD) in Belgrade, which belongs to the University for Peace in Costa Rica associated with the United Nations. Grossarth-Maticek was awarded the title Professor by the European Center for Peace and Development (ECPD), which he may use in Germany with the addition Professor for Postgraduate Studies, ECPD. His eldest son from his first marriage is Jan Grossarth, and from his second marriage he has two sons and two daughters. He died in Heidelberg, Germany on 16 November 2025, at the age of 85.

== Research ==
From 1973 to 1995, Grossarth-Maticek directed the Heidelberg Prospective Study, a long-term study in which around 30,000 people from 18,000 Heidelberg households were examined at regular intervals over a period of more than 20 years for a variety of health-influencing variables. On extensive questionnaires, he recorded dozens of physical factors (such as cigarette smoking, exercise, organ damage, genetic disposition and nutrition) as well as psychological factors (attachment to the mother in early childhood, stressors, distress, eustress, self-regulation). He developed his own behavioral typology, into which he classified the interviewees according to the degree of their self-regulation.

According to Grossarth-Maticek, this research shows the risk of illness is multiplied by an insufficient self-regulation. Physical risk factors work mainly in sum, but especially when psychological risk factors are present at the same time. In the Heidelberg Prospective Study, Grossarth showed a predominantly multi-causal origin of chronic diseases. Grossarth-Maticek speaks of a "peculiar compulsion to act without necessity in a certain way and not differently". Such behavior arises from a consolidation of behavior patterns in the first years of life. If the "free flow of love" was disturbed by early childhood rejections, traumata, disappointment or other experiences, there could be disturbances of the inner and outer communication in adulthood, which, in combination with other factors synergistically, have an effect on health. Inspired by the cooperation with the psychologist Hans Jürgen Eysenck, Grossarth developed a new behavioural typology.

=== Grossarthian behavioral typology ===
In the behavioral typology developed by Grossarth, six types of behavioral patterns are distinguished:

Type I: Suffering in isolation: central and persistent orientation towards a longed-for but withdrawing object; inhibition in the realization of the longed-for proximity, thus inhibiting the satisfaction of this emotionally most important need.

Type II: Helpless excitement: Central and persistent orientation towards a disturbing, obstructive object, without reaching the desired distancing, with recurring overexcitation and a feeling of helplessly being at the mercy of others.

Type III: Ambivalence: narcissistic ambivalence and strong egocentrism. Emotional instability with interim phases of autonomous self-regulation, but also with phases of intensive search for closeness with emotional needs on the one hand and after injuries phases of hyperactive excessive distancing on the other hand.

Type IV: Good self-regulation: Orientation towards current objects that enable subjective well-being, pleasure and security through which a sense of purpose can be experienced. Flexible self-regulation adapted to the situation and needs.

Type V: Emphasizes rational: Rational and antiemotional behavior. When overwhelmed by emotions, psychological crises and depressive mood arise.

Type VI: Irrational-emotional: Irrational, behaviour dominated by one's own feelings, without rational verification of one's own behaviour.

This typology is the result of Grossarth-Maticek's investigations into and considerations for the history and frequency of chronic diseases and health. He emphasizes similarities between types I and II and sees type III as a hybrid of I and II. Of course, in one subject, characteristics of several behavior types may be present at the same time, but one of them is usually dominant in behavior.

=== Autonomy training ===
Grossarth-Maticek and his collaborators, as Helm Stierlin who wrote a preamble in Grossarth's book "Selbstregulation, Autonomie und Gesundheit", developed an autonomy training aimed at stimulating self-regulation. The effectiveness of this cognitive behavioural therapy, which he refers to as autonomy training, was examined in an intervention study (Randomized controlled trial). In this relatively short period of autonomy training, the ability to achieve well-being, pleasure, security, and fulfilment of meaning through self-active problem solving is strengthened in conversations. The trainee is encouraged to perceive himself/herself and to recognize which activities increase his/her well-being. Autonomy training is seen as a preventive intervention, which is suitable for achieving effective behavioural changes in a relatively short time and then incorporating them into a long-term preventive programme.

Grossarth uses the term "autonomy" in the sense of an inner independence from objects with negative experienced consequences, which results from self-knowledge and redesign of communication. Self-regulation includes the personal ability to create the conditions for pleasure, well-being, security and inner balance through one's own behaviour in interpersonal relationships. However, the aim of this autonomy training is not egocentric Epicureanism, which ignores fellow human beings, but an attainment of happiness in a socially accepted framework, which respects and supports both the fellow human beings and one's own person. In 2001 Grossarth-Maticek had this protected under trademark law under the term Autonomietraining Gesundheit und Problemlösung durch Anregung der Selbstregulation.

The statistically average life-prolonging effect of autonomy training in cancer patients demonstrated in the Heidelberg prospective study cannot be interpreted in such a way that autonomy training is a method with which permanent healing can be achieved in any case, but the results show that the improvement of self-regulation is one of the factors that contribute to an improvement in the function of the immune system e.g. by changes in behaviour with regard to habits that are harmful to or promote health, stress reduction and increase in subjective well-being. His clinical study on mistletoe therapy in connection with improvement of self-regulation produced corresponding results. According to Grossarth-Maticek's findings, a high degree of self-regulation is also a significant factor for prevention. This was evident both in those people examined in this longitudinal study who already had good self-regulation and in those who learned it in the course of autonomy training. The database was verified by Werner W. Wittmann, who wrote the preface of Grossarth's book "Synergetic Preventive Medicine" (2008).

Based on Grossarth-Maticek's autonomy training and the effects on salutogenesis, Dierk Petzold, a physician and lecturer for general medicine at the Hannover Medical School, developed the concept of salutogenic communication.

=== Reception in Japan ===
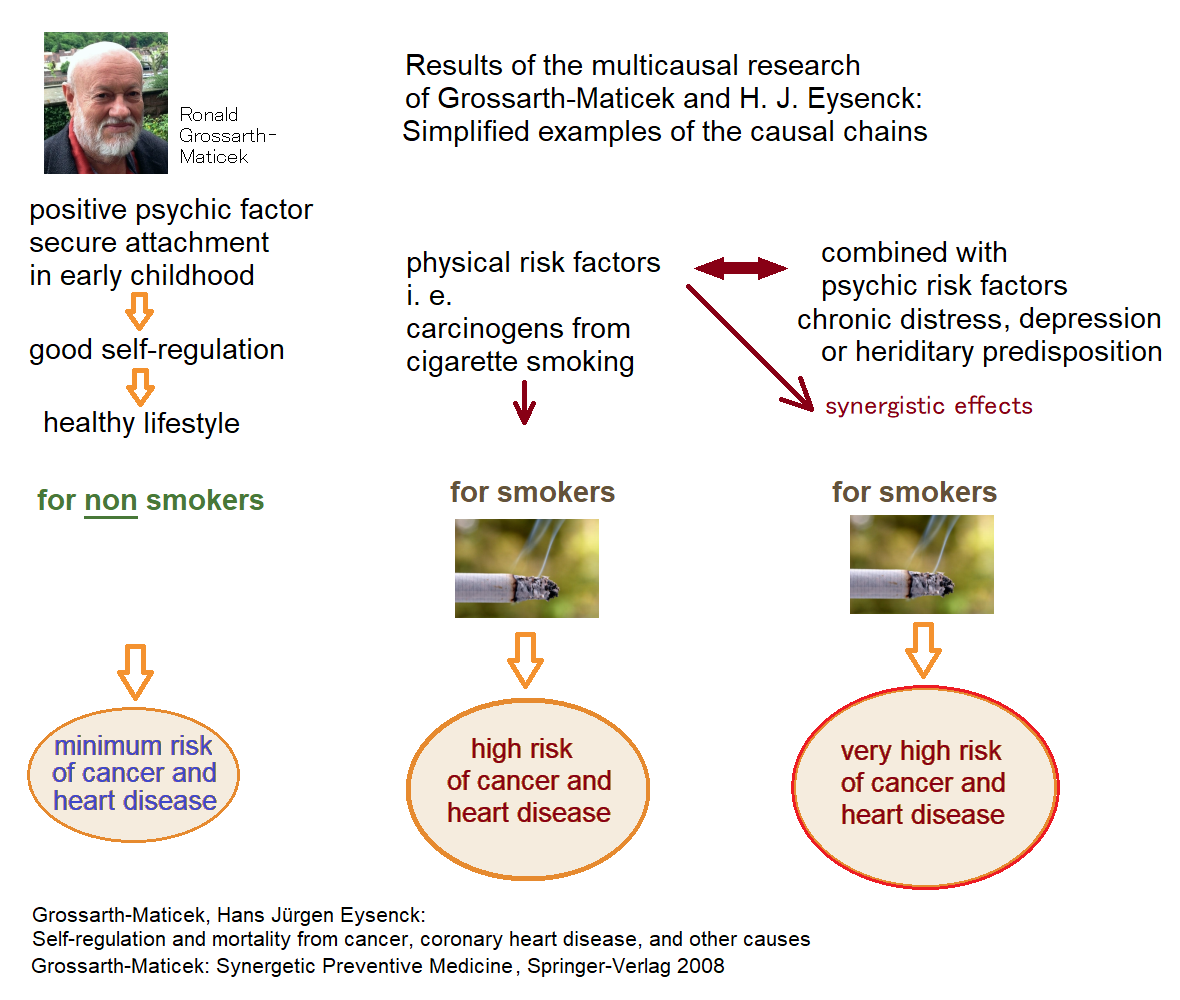

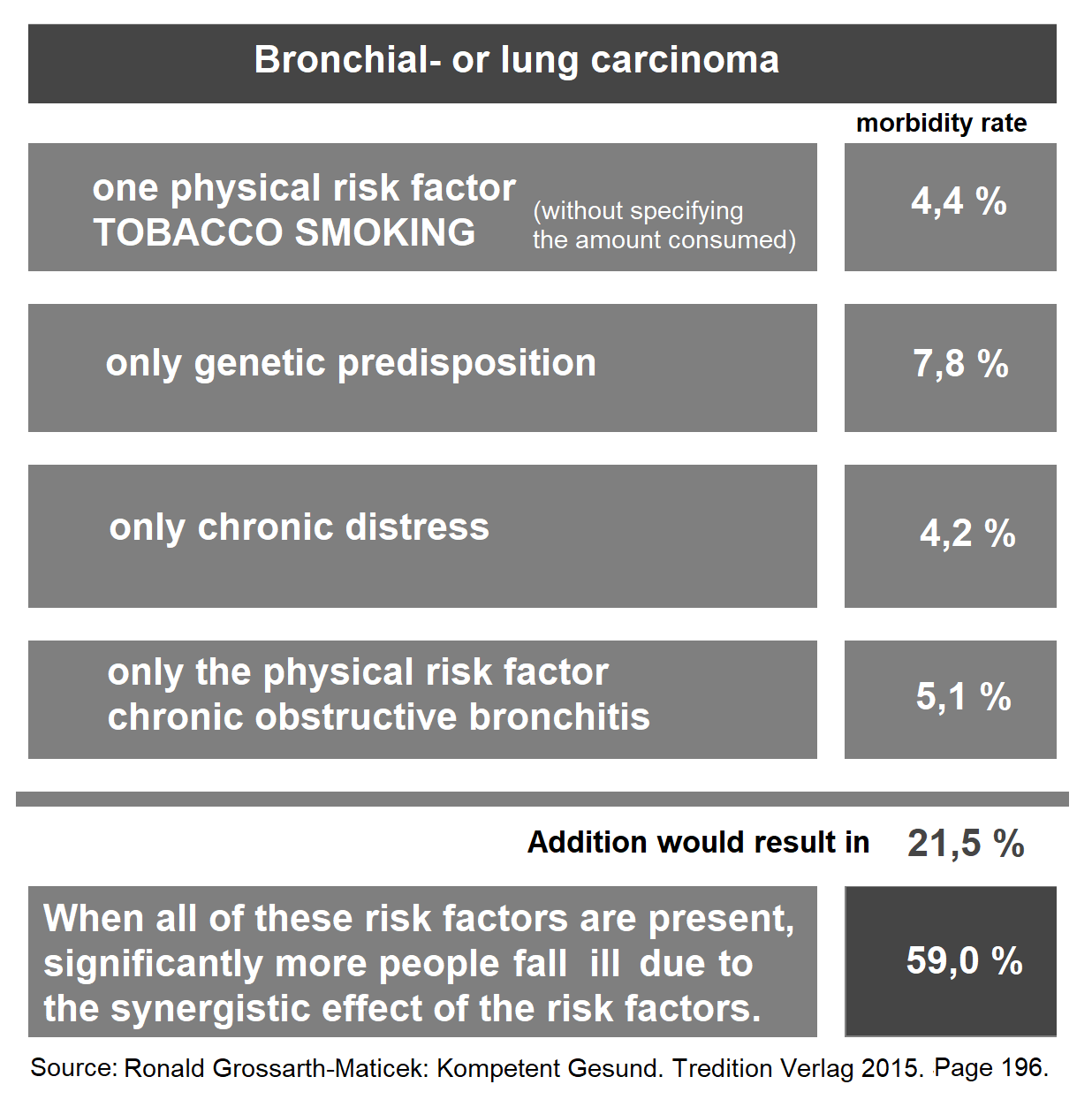
Example for synergistic effects of risk factors according to the research results of R. Grossarth-Maticek. Carcinomas in other organs are also caused by tobacco smoking as a major risk factor, meaning that the total number of people affected by cancer is much higher (R. Grossarth-Maticek 2008 and 2015).

Jun Nagano and his team from the Institute of Health Sciences at University Kyūshū carried out control studies on the correlation between the behavioral types distinguished by Grossarth and the frequency of certain diseases, as well as on the effectiveness of autonomy training. Although Grossarth does not speak of personality types, but of six types of changeable behavior, the Japanese authors lack a precise differentiation of the terms, so that on the one hand the term "behavior" is correctly used, but on the other hand the term "disease-prone personality", which Grossarth disproved, is wrongly used in the same context. As part of a collaboration between the Department of Psychosomatic Medicine of the University Kyūshū and the Ruprecht-Karls-Universität Heidelberg, Japanese physicians and other scientists, led by Jun Nagano, participated in two academic conferences at the Center for Multidisciplinary Research (Zentrum für multidisziplinäre Forschung ZMF) and founded the Japan Autonomy Training Association.

== Public challenges ==
In 2004, Lutz Edler claimed alleged deficiencies in a study on synergy effects of mistletoe therapy with other factors. In an article in the Deutsches Ärzteblatt there is a correction by Helmut Kiene (Witten/Herdecke University) in which Kiene maintains that all the points mentioned by Edler were based on incorrect assumptions and a lack of professional understanding.

Roderick D. Buchanan argued that Grossarth, who had "come a long way from ... war-torn Yugoslavia" was "living in a fine house overlooking the Heidelberg Castle in Germany on the steep embankments of the Neckar river" (in the neighbourhood of the Helm Stierlin-Institute) and that "a few thought him a visionary, but many distrusted him," and that in 1977 when he presented his 100-page manuscript about the longitudinal research programme he had started in 1973 for the purpose of his habilitation to the University of Heidelberg Psychology Department "according to (Manfred) Amelang, the document was rejected largely, because the claims made were so extraordinary".

Beginning around 1984 Grossarth worked in collaboration with the London psychologist Hans Eysenck. Eysenck played no role in the initiation of Grossarth's studies, nor had much influence over the process of most of the data-gathering. Eysenck would suggest analysis of the existing data and suggested that certain variables be explored more systematically. Their joint work was published during the years 1985-2000.

In an article published in 2019 in the Journal of Health Psychology, Anthony J. Pelosi and David F. Marks requested a review of some these works Grossarth-Maticek had coauthored with Eysenck. This led to an inquiry by King's College London, which described the work as "incompatible with modern clinical science", and described 25 of the co-authored papers as "unsafe". Grossarth has presented some rebuttal points on a website.

== Replication study ==
A single potentially positive response to the withdrawn articles can be found in Whitfield et al. (2020): "Despite criticisms of the Grossarth-Maticek and Eysenck data, we found empirical support for some SIRI subtypes. In accord with the Grossarth-Maticek and Eysenck personality-stress model, and consistent with two previous SIRI studies, inverse associations of Type 4 (healthy) scores with all-cause mortality were found and also Type 2 scores predicted CVD mortality. However, no significant relationship was found between Type 1 scores and cancer mortality.

== Selected works ==
- Grossarth-Maticek, Ronald (1975). Anfänge anarchistischer Gewaltbereitschaft in der Bundesrepublik Deutschland (in German). Bonn-Bad Godesberg: Hohwacht. ISBN 978-3-87353-041-6.
- Grossarth-Maticek, Ronald (2003). Autonomietraining. Gesundheit und Problemlösung durch Anregung der Selbstregulation (in German). Berlin: De Gruyter. ISBN 978-3-11-081457-6.
- Ronald Grossarth-Maticek, Hans Jürgen Eysenck, Greg J. Boyle: Method of test administration as a factor in test validity: the use of a personality questionnaire in the prediction of cancer and coronary heart disease. In: Behaviour Research and Therapy, Volume 33, Issue 6, July 1995, page 705-710
- Grossarth-Maticek, Ronald; Kiene, Helmut; Baumgartner, Stephan M.; Ziegler, Renatus (2001). "Einsatz von Iscador, ein Extrakt der europäischen Mistel (Viscum album), zur Krebsbehandlung: Prospektive nicht-randomisierte und randomisierte Matched-Pair-Studien eingebettet in eine Kohortenstudie" (PDF). Merkurstab (in German).
- Grossarth-Maticek, Ronald (2006). "Ergebnisse einer prospektiven, randomisierten Verlaufsstudie zur Erforschung der Wirksamkeit eines Nahrungsergänzungsmittels in Bezug auf subjektive Befindlichkeit und Veränderung physischer Risikofaktoren". Erfahrungsheilkunde (in German). 52 (8). Haug: 497–508. doi:10.1055/s-2003-41226.
- Grossarth-Maticek, Ronald; Fintelmann, Volker; Grossarth-Fintelmann, Fernando C.; Hamm, Michael; Hardewig-Budny, Bettina (2006). Ganz einfach gut leben. Krebsvorbeugung mit Leib und Seele (in German). Trostberg: Erdl. ISBN 978-3-925249-65-5.
- Grossarth-Maticek, Ronald: Lustvoll gesund - vom Leid zum Glück
- Ziegler, Renatus; Grossarth-Maticek, Ronald (June 2010). "Individual Patient Data Meta-analysis of Survival and Psychosomatic Self-regulation from Published Prospective Controlled Cohort Studies for Long-term Therapy of Breast Cancer Patients with a Mistletoe Preparation (Iscador)". Evidence-Based Complementary and Alternative Medicine. 7 (2): 157–66. doi:10.1093/ecam/nen025. PMC 2862937. PMID 18955332.
- Grossarth-Maticek, Ronald (1979). Kognitive Verhaltenstherapie – Rauchen Übergewicht Emotionaler Stress [Smoking, Overweight, Emotional Stress]. Hamburg: Springer. ISBN 978-3-642-81338-2.
- Grossarth-Maticek, Ronald (2015). Kompetent Gesund. Krankheitsentstehung und Gesundheitsentwicklung im psychophysischen System. Das Autonomietraining als Prävention (in German). Hamburg. ISBN 978-3-7323-2398-2.
- Krankheit als Biographie. Ein medizinsoziologisches Modell der Krebsentstehung und -therapie. Köln: Kiepenheuer & Witsch. 1979. ISBN 978-3-462-01348-1.
- Grossarth-Maticek, Ronald; Jürgen Eysenck, Hans (1990). Prophylactic effects of psychoanalysis on cancer-prone and coronary heart disease-prone probands, as compared with control groups and behaviour therapy groups. Vol. 21. pp. 91–99. doi:10.1016/0005-7916(90)90014-c. PMID 2273076. (Retracted, see doi:10.1016/j.jbtep.2021.101669, PMID 34167787)
- Radikalismus. Untersuchungen zur Persönlichkeitsentwicklung westdeutscher Studenten. Basel: Karger. 1979. ISBN 978-3-8055-3035-4.
- Grossarth-Maticek, Ronald (November 1982). Revolution der Gestörten?. Quelle + Meyer.
- Grossarth-Maticek, Ronald (2003). Selbstregulation, Autonomie und Gesundheit. Krankheitsfaktoren und soziale Gesundheitsressourcen im sozio-psycho-biologischen System (in German). Berlin: De Gruyter. ISBN 978-3-11-017495-3.
- Grossarth-Maticek, Ronald; Jürgen Eysenck, Hans (1995). "Self-regulation and mortality from cancer, coronary heart disease, and other causes: A prospective study". Personality and Individual Differences. 19 (6): 781–795. doi:10.1016/S0191-8869(95)00123-9. (This paper currently has an expression of concern, see doi:10.1016/j.paid.2020.109855, Retraction Watch)
- "Synergetische Präventivmedizin. Strategien für Gesundheit" (PDF) (in German). Hamburg: Springer. 2008.
- Grossarth-Maticek, Ronald (1999). Systemische Epidemiologie und präventive Verhaltensmedizin chronischer Erkrankungen – Strategien zur Aufrechterhaltung der Gesundheit (in German). Berlin: De Gruyter. ISBN 978-3-11-080578-9.
- Grossarth-Maticek, Ronald; Stierlin, Helm (1998). Krebsrisiken – Überlebenschancen. Wie Körper, Seele und soziale Umwelt zusammenwirken (in German). Heidelberg: Carl-Auer-Systeme. ISBN 978-3-89670-534-1.
