= Tony Gibson (psychologist) =

British psychologist, anarchist, and model (1914–2001)

- Born: Hamilton Bertie Gibson; 14 October 1914; Romford, Essex, England
- Died: 22 March 2001 (aged 86); Cambridge, England
- Education: Cranleigh School; London School of Economics; Institute of Psychiatry
- Occupation: Psychologist
- Employers: University of Cambridge; Institute of Psychiatry; University of Hertfordshire
- Known for: Political activism, Gibson Spiral Maze, Hypnotism
- Partners: Betty Cummings (d. 1984); Carol Graham
- Children: 2

Hamilton Bertie Gibson (14 October 1914 – 22 March 2001), generally known as Tony Gibson, was a British psychologist, anarchist, and model. He became known for his objection to Great Britain's involvement in World War II and his subsequent imprisonment for being an unregistered conscientious objector.

In 1939, while working as a life model for art students, Gibson was selected to model for Brylcreem advertisements. During the Battle of Britain he was depicted wearing an RAF uniform, despite the fact that he was in prison as a conscientious objector. After serving three sentences he agreed to work as an ambulance driver and then as an agricultural labourer.

After the war Gibson worked at Burgess Hill School teaching woodwork and biology. In the 1950s he studied sociology at the London School of Economics and psychology at the Institute of Psychiatry, following which he undertook research at the Institute of Criminology at the University of Cambridge.

While in Cambridge, Gibson developed the Spiral Maze, a psychomotor test that was able to distinguish between normal boys and those who were maladjusted or delinquent. This test has also been found to be useful in assessing psychomotor impairment due to drugs.

In 1970 Gibson founded the Psychology Department at University of Hertfordshire which he headed until 1976. He was the first president of the British Society of Experimental and Clinical Hypnosis.

In 1981 Gibson had published a biography of Hans Eysenck, with whom he had worked at the Institute of Psychiatry in London

Gibson died in Cambridge aged 86 on 22 March 2001.
