= Werner W. Wittmann =

German psychologist (born 1944)

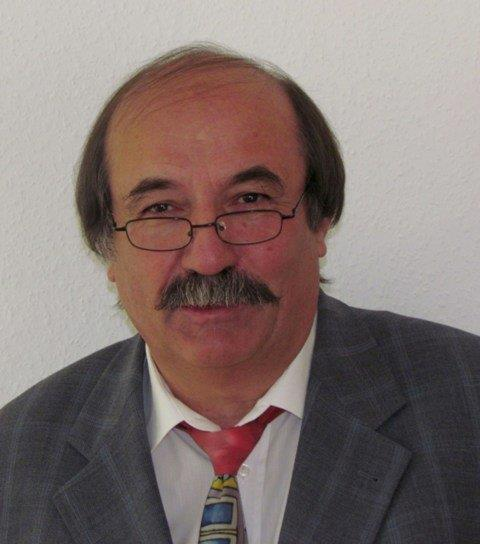
Werner W. Wittmann

Werner W. Wittmann (born 11 January 1944) is a German psychologist, evaluation researcher and research methodologist.

== Biography ==
Werner W. Wittmann grew up in Nuremberg, where he completed his Abitur in 1964. He studied psychology at the University of Freiburg (Diploma degree 1972) and received his doctorate in 1977 with a thesis on factor-analytical models, methodological studies and problems of reproducibility. In his habilitation in 1984, he dealt with the topic of evaluation research, which was published in 1985 as a book by Springer-Verlag. From 1973 to 1984 Werner W. Wittmann was a scientific assistant at the Psychological Institute of the University of Freiburg at the chair of Personality Psychology (Jochen Fahrenberg), where he was appointed to a temporary professorship with a focus on methodology in 1984. From 1988 to 1993 he was a C2 professor at the Faculty of Economics and Social Sciences of the University of Erlangen-Nuremberg and from 1993 to his retirement in 2009 he held the chair of Psychology II, Methods, Diagnostics and Evaluation at the Faculty of Social Sciences of the University of Mannheim. His interest in collaborative research projects, teaching and international exchange led to several visiting professorships, among others at the universities Heidelberg, Berlin. (FU), Bern, Fribourg (Switzerland), Vienna and San Diego (SDSU). From 2006 to 2009 Werner Wittmann was head of the Otto-Selz-Institute at the University of Mannheim and subsequently became head of a department for evaluation, diagnostics and methods at the same institute. Werner W. Wittmann is/was member of the editorial board of several scientific journals, among others. Journal of Experimental Psychology: Applied, Zeitschrift für Personalpsychologie, Diagnostica, Applied Measurement und Praxis Klinische Verhaltensmedizin und Rehabilitation.

== Research ==
At the centre of Werner Wittmann's work is an attempt to unite the sometimes contradictory methods and goals of experimental and non-experimental research approaches in the social and behavioural sciences. His work is based on works by Lee Cronbach, Donald T. Campbell, Thomas D. Cook, R.F. Boruch, Egon Brunswik, L. Sechrest, Gene V. Glass, Raymond Bernard Cattell and Kenneth Hammond.

The central focus of Werner Wittmann's research and scientific theory is on considerations of a multivariate reliability and validity theory (esp. Wittmann, 1985, 1988). It was proposed as a possible solution to the general covariation problem described by Jochen Fahrenberg (Fahrenberg, 1982) of the multi-method approach in psychological diagnostics (so-called Multitrait-Multimethod-MTMM-Approach). The core is the model of the 4, later 5 data boxes (Five-Box-Model, Wittmann, 1990), a model for the conception, execution and evaluation of evaluation studies, which was mainly used in rehabilitation and intelligence research. It is based on Cattell's data box BDRM Basic Data Relation Matrix (Raymond Cattell, 1966) and Brunswik's lens model (Brunswik, 1956). In addition to the five related data boxes, the main determinants are the symmetry principle and the principle of data aggregation.

Werner Wittmann's integrative thinking made him a pioneer of evaluation research in Germany, opened up new perspectives for solving fundamental challenges of translational research methodology, and made him a pioneer of evidence-based decisions in health care. In recognition of his contributions to evaluation research, Werner Wittmann received the 2005 F. Lazarsfeld Award for Evaluation Theory from the American Evaluation Association.

=== Main research areas ===
- Psychological Methodology, Multivariate Reliability and Validity Theory

Evaluation research, especially in the field of medical rehabilitation, focus on psychosomatic rehabilitation, here several large program evaluation studies together with Jürgen Schmidt and Rüdiger Nübling, including "Zauberberg studies", EQUA study, Bad Herrenalber catamnesis study and comprehensive: meta-analysis of psychosomatic rehabilitation, MESTA study Meta-analysis of the effects of German-speaking psychotherapy together with Georg E. Matt

- Development of several assessment procedures, etc. ZUF8 (Schmidt et al. 1989), FPTM (Nübling et al., 2006)

Wittmann has been involved in research on outpatient psychotherapeutic care, including projects conducted in collaboration with Wolfgang Lutz, head of the TK project on behalf of Techniker Krankenkasse, and with Bernhard Strauss, head of the pilot study QS-PSY-BAY on behalf of the Kassenärztliche Vereinigung Bayern (Wittmann et al., 2012). His research has also addressed the Brunswik symmetry principle and examined relationships between working memory and intelligence, intelligence and complex problem solving, intelligence and academic performance, as well as the predictive validity of personality traits such as extraversion and introversion.

== Literature ==
- Wittmann, W. W.: Factor Analytical Models, Method Studies and Problems of Reproducibility. Dissertation, University, Faculty of Philosophy, Freiburg i. Br. (1977).
- Wittmann, W. W. (1985). Evaluation research. Tasks, problems and applications. Berlin: Springer.
- Matt, G. E. & Wittmann, W. W. (1985). German-language psychotherapy effects research controlled by the status quo from the perspective of a meta-analysis. Journal for Clinical Psychology, 14(4), 293-312.
- Wittmann, W. W. & Matt, G. E. (1986). Meta-analysis as integration of research results using the example of German-language work on the effectiveness of psychotherapy. Psychological review, 37(1), 20-40.
- Wittmann, W. W. (1987). Foundations of successful research in psychology: multimodal diagnostics, multiplexing, multivariate reliability and validity theory. Diagnostica, 33(3), 209-226.
- Schmidt, J., Bernhard, P., Wittmann, W. W. & Lamprecht, F. (1987). The distinction between singular and multiple result criteria. A contribution to the problem of criteria in evaluation. In F. Lamprecht (Ed.), Specialization and Integration in Psychosomatics and Psychotherapy. German College of Psychosomatic Medicine, 6–8 March 1986 (pp. 293–299). Berlin: Springer.
- Wittmann, W. W. (1988): Multivariate Reliability Theory. Principles of symmetry and successful validation strategies. In J. R. Nesselroade & R. B. Cattell (Eds.), Handbook of multivariate experimental psychology (pp. 505–560). New York: Plenum Press.
- Schweizer, K. & Wittmann, W. (1989). An evaluation of the replicability of psychophysiological relations for aggregate data. Personality and Individual Differences, 10(4), 427-435.
- Wittmann, W. W. (1990). Brunswik symmetry and the conception of the five data boxes. A framework concept for comprehensive evaluation research. Journal for Educational Psychology, 4(4), 241-251.
- Koch, U. & Wittmann, W. W. (Ed.). (1990). Evaluation Research. Evaluation basis of social and health programmes. Berlin: Springer.
- Wittmann, W.W. (1995). The significance of Brunswik-Symmetry for psychological research and assessment. European Journal of Psychological Assessment, 11(1), 59-60.
- Cook, T. D. & Wittmann, W. W. (1998). Lessons learned about evaluation in the United States and some possible implications for Europe. European Journal of Psychological Assessment, 14(2), 97-115.
- Nübling, R., Schmidt, J. & Wittmann, W. W. (1999). Long-term results of psychosomatic rehabilitation. Psychotherapy, psychosomatics, medical psychology, 343-353.
- Wittmann, W. W. & Süß, H.-M. (1999). Investigating the paths between working memory, intelligence, knowledge, and complex problem-solving performances via Brunswik symmetry. In P. L. Ackerman, P. C. Kyllonen & R. D. Roberts (Eds.), Learning and individual differences (pp. 77–108). Washington, DC: American Psychological Association.
- Schmidt, J., Nübling, R. & Wittmann, W.W. (2000). Results of psychosomatic rehabilitation based on five program evaluation studies. Clinical Behavioral Medicine and Rehabilitation Practice, 13(52), 32-47.
- Wittmann, W. W., Nübling, R. & Schmidt, J. (2002). Evaluation research and programme evaluation in health care. Journal for Evaluation, 39-60.
- Süß, H.-M., Oberauer, K., Wittmann, W. W., Wilhelm, O. & Schulze, R. (2002). Working memory capacity explains reasoning ability - and a little bit more. Intelligence, 30, 261 - 288.
- Schmidt, J., Steffanowski, A., Nübling, R., Lichtenberg, S. & Wittmann, W. W. (2003). Result quality of inpatient psychosomatic rehabilitation. Comparison of different evaluation strategies. Regensburg: Roderer.
- Beauducel, A. & Wittmann, W. W. (2005). Simulation study on fit indices in confirmatory factor analysis based on data with slightly distorted simple structure. Structural Equation Modeling, 12, 41-75.
- André Beauducel, Bernhard Biehl, et al.: Multivariate Research Strategies: Festschrift in Honor of Werner W. Wittmann (Berichte aus der Psychologie) (Englisch). Verlag Shaker 2005.
- Nübling, R., Schulz, H., Schmidt, J., Koch, U. & Wittmann, W. W. (2006). Questionnaire on Psychotherapy Motivation (FPTM) - Test Construction and Quality Criteria. In R. Nübling, F. A. Muthny & J. Bengel (ed.), Reha-Motivation und Behandlungserwartung (pp. 252–270). Bern: Huber.
- Wittmann, W. W. W. & Klumb, P. L. (2006). Wie man sich mit Experimenten zum Testen psychologischer Theorien täuschen kann. In R. R. Bootzin & P. E. McKnight (Hrsg.), Stärkung der Forschungsmethodik: Psychologische Messung und Bewertung (S. 185-211). Washington, DC: Amerikanische Psychologische Vereinigung.
- Völkle, M. C., Ackerman, P. & Wittmann, W. W. (2007). Effect sizes and ratios < 1.0. Sense or nonsense? Methodology : European Journal of Research Methods for the Behavioral and Social Sciences, 3, 35-46.
- Steffanowski, A., Löschmann, C., Schmidt, J., Wittmann, W. W. & Nübling, R. (2007). Meta-Analyse der Effekte stationärer psychosomatischer Rehabilitation. Mesta-Studie. Bern: Huber.
- Hunt, E. & Wittmann, W. (2008). Nationale Intelligenz und nationaler Wohlstand. Intelligenz, 36(1), 1-9.
- Strauss, B.M., Lutz, W., Steffanowski, A. Wittmann, W. W., Boehnke, J. R., Rubel, J., Scheidt, C. E., Caspar, F., Vogel, H., Altmann, U., Steyer, R., Zimmermann, A., Bruckmayer, E., von Heymann, F., Kramer, D. & Kirchmann H.(2014): Benefits and challenges in practice-oriented psychotherapy research in Germany: The TK and the QS-PSY-BAY projects of quality assurance in outpatient psychotherapy.
- Kaufmann, E., Reips U.-D., Wittmann W.W. (2013): A Critical Meta-Analysis of Lens Model Studies in Human Judgment and Decision-Making PLoS ONE December 2013.
- Kaufmann, E., Wittmann W. W. (2016): The Success of Linear Bootstrapping Models: Decision Domain-, Expertise-, and Criterion-Specific Meta-Analysis PLoS ONE June 2016.
- Kaufmann, E., Wittmann W. W. (2018): Underestimated Swiss STEM potential? Bright light on an international PISA comparison
