= Helm Stierlin =

German psychiatrist (1926–2021)

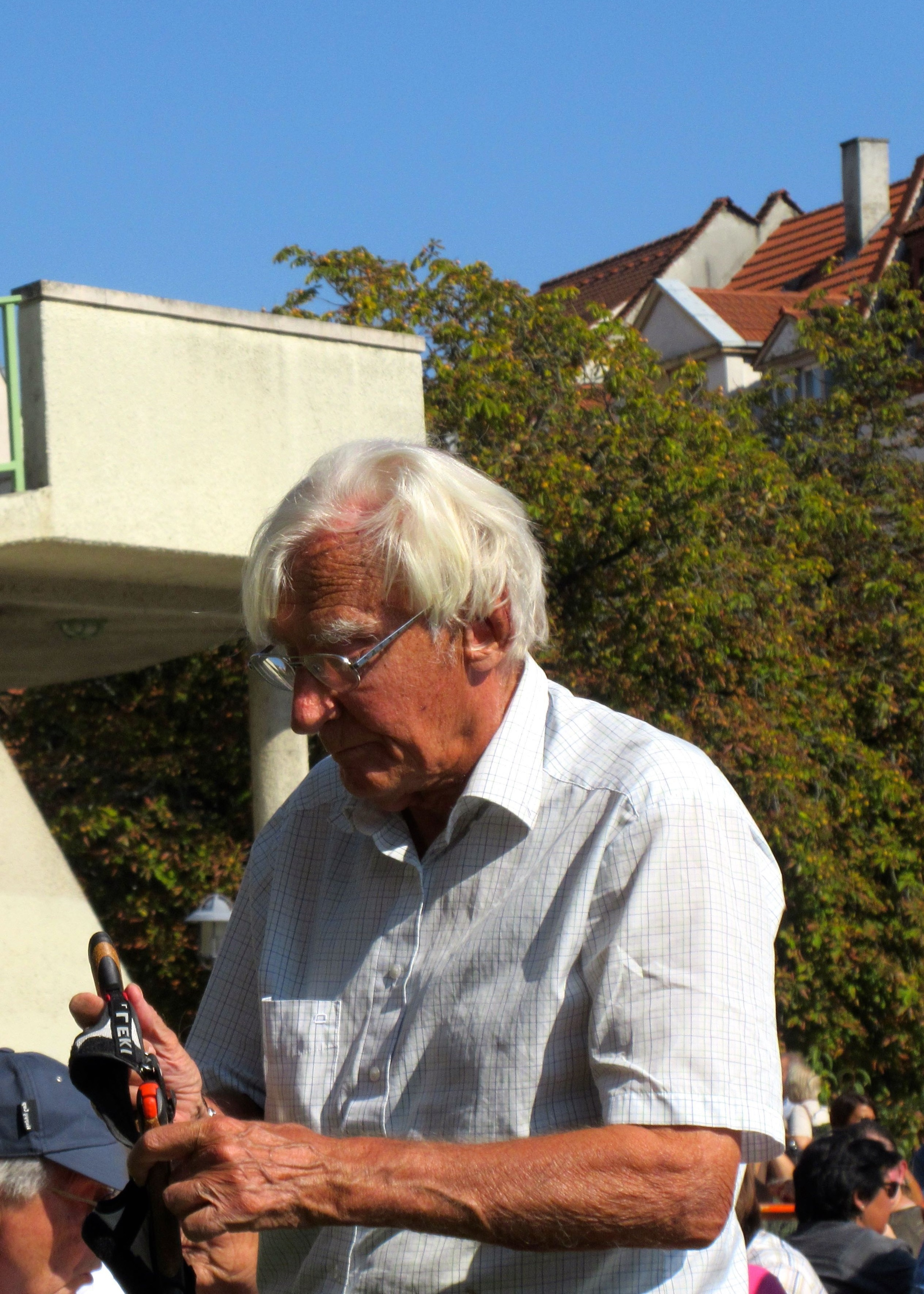
Stierlin 2016 in Heidelberg-Neuenheim

Helm Stierlin (12 March 1926 – 9 September 2021), born as Wilhelm Paul Stierlin, was a German psychiatrist, psychoanalyst and systemic family therapist. From 1974 to 1991 he was the medical director and chairowner of the Department for psychoanalytic basic research and Family Therapy at the Medical Faculty of the University of Heidelberg. Stierlin contributed significantly to the establishment and further development of systemic therapy in Germany.

Until 1995 he was the editor of the journal Familiendynamik. His scientific writings and books were translated into twelve languages.

== Biography ==
=== Early life ===
Helm Stierlin was the oldest of three sons of the bridge-building engineer and government architect Paul Stierlin (1890 in Stuttgart – 1 April 1945 in Mannheim) and his wife Elsbeth-Sophie, née Schöningh (1905 in Meppen – 1995 in Neckarhausen).

His paternal grandparents are Wilhelm Stierlin, director of the Königlich Württembergische Eisenbahn (1853-1906), nobility by awarding the Hausorden der Württembergischen Krone, and his wife Anna Stierlin, née Bilfinger (1856-1928). Johann Wendelin Bilfinger, dean in Cannstatt, later Protestant abbot, is an ancestor of Helm Stierlin and the father of Georg Bernhard Bilfinger. Stierlin's maternal grandparents are the manor owner Eduard Schöningh and his wife Elisabeth.

Helm Stierlin is married to the Swiss psychologist and family therapist Satuila Stierlin. Two daughters are descended from the marriage.

Helm Stierlin grew up in Mannheim, Großwallstadt, Neckarsteinach and from 1935 to 1945 in Stettin. Due to his father's job, the Stierlin family moved several times. As a young soldier Helm took part in the Second World War. After the Unconditional surrender of the Wehrmacht on 7 May 1945, he succeeded as a 19-year-old in reaching his homeland via Prague without being captured. Helm Stierlin's younger brother Gerhard died at the age of 17 in the Second World War.

=== Medical education ===
When the universities reopened their doors in 1945, Helm Stierlin enrolled for the medicine at the University of Heidelberg after completing an emergency baccalaureate. Parallel to the compulsory medical lectures and seminars, Stierlin attended the philosophical lectures of Karl Jaspers as often as he could, which demanded a balancing act from him every now and then, since the lecture venues of the medical faculty and the philosophical faculty were far apart from each other, but the compulsory lectures and the optional lectures at Karl Jaspers in Philosophy that interested him were very close in their schedule. Besides Jasper's approaches, the Hegel school of thought for Stierlin remained a lifelong paradigm.

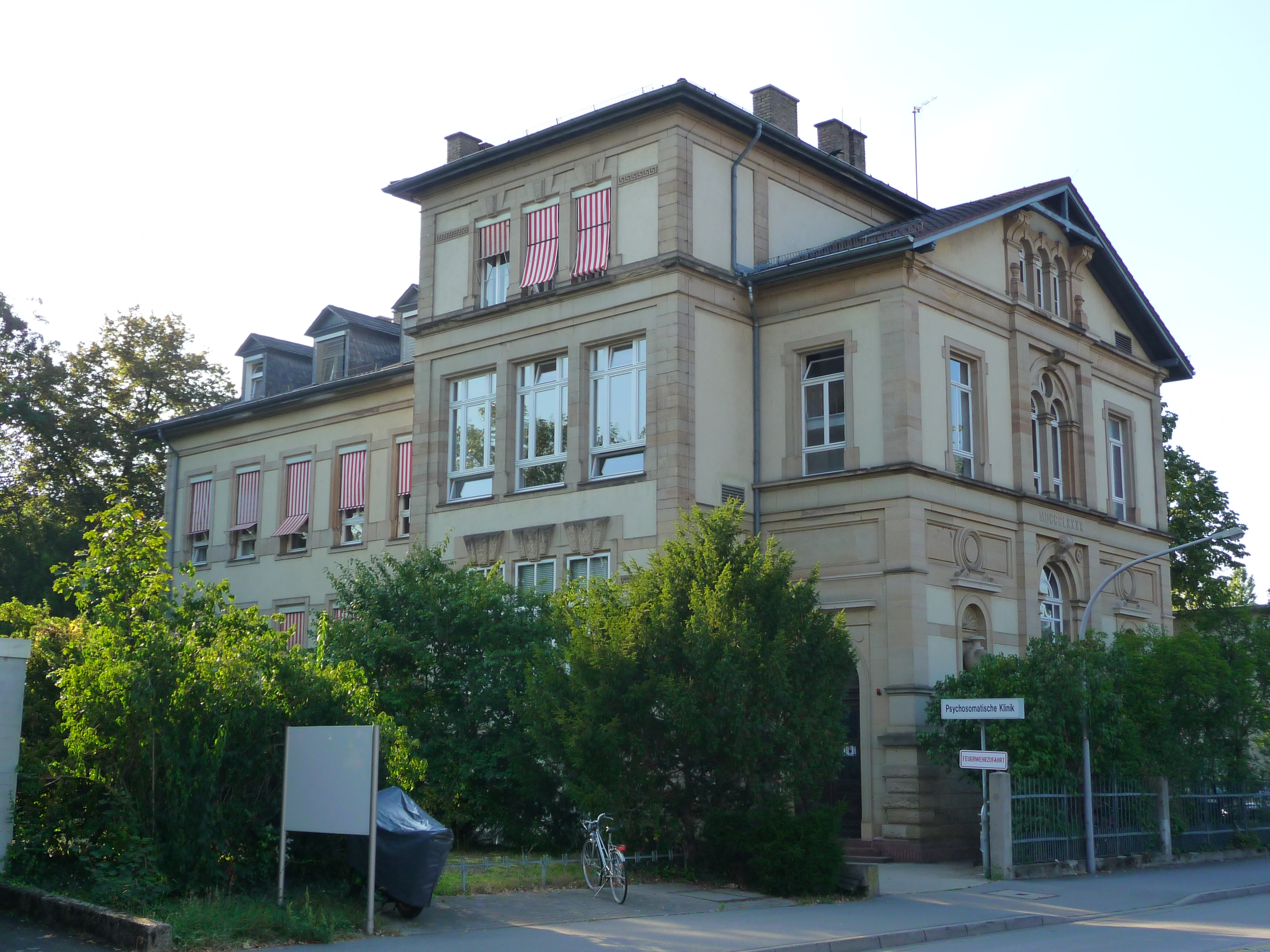
University clinic for Psychosomatic Medicine, old hospital in Heidelberg-Bergheim

Besides yet unresolved derailments of the ethical attitudes and medical practices of some professors at the medical faculties of the universities of Germany during the National Socialism period, there were many positive research approaches and new interdisciplinary ties and connections in Heidelberg after 1945, which had been initiated in particular by the scientific approaches and research work of Viktor von Weizsäcker and Alexander Mitscherlich.

In 1950, a chair for psychosomatic medicine was established at the University of Heidelberg, of which Viktor von Weizsäcker became the first holder. Mitscherlich, who played a major role in the establishment of the institute, left Heidelberg in 1960 and moved to Frankfurt am Main, where he became the first director after the war at the newly founded Sigmund Freud Institute.

Stierlin received his doctorate in philosophy in 1950 from Karl Jaspers at the University of Heidelberg with a dissertation on: "The Concept of Responsibility: Attempt at a Discussion of John Dewey's Pragmatic Ethics of science in Comparison with the Ethik of Kant with Consideration of Max Weber's Concept of Science". The rapporteur was Kurt Rossmann, the co-rapporteur was Hans-Georg Gadamer.

Five years later, Stierlin received his doctorate in medicine from Kurt Kolle and Gustav Bodechtel at the Medical Faculty of the Ludwig-Maximilians-Universität München with a dissertation on the subject: "The violent patient: An investigation into the attacks perpetrated by the mentally ill on doctors and nurses".

== Professional career ==
In 1957 Helm Stierlin went to the United States. Here he worked and researched in particular about psychosomatic medicine, the psychopathology of schizophrenia, psychosis, about the process of detachment in adolescence and the most recent therapeutic experiences in family therapy with the expanding therapeutic concepts within the framework of system-theoretical approaches.

Stierlin interrupted his stay in America for one year from 1963 to 1964 in order to pursue further training at the Sanatory Bellevue in Kreuzlingen. From 1965 to 1973 he headed the Department of Family Therapy at the National Institute of Mental Health in Bethesda, Maryland. During his years in America, he was invited to guest lectureships and visiting professorships at various American universities. He also followed invitations to guest lectures and lectures in New Zealand and Australia.

During his time in the US, Stierlin got to know the most important pioneers in the field of family therapy research, including Gregory Bateson, Milton H. Erickson, Jay Haley, Margaret Mead, Salvador Minuchin, Virginia Satir and John Weakland.

In 1974 Helm Stierlin received a call to the University Clinic Heidelberg for the newly established chair Department of Psychoanalytic Basic Research and Family Therapy. He held this chair until his retirement in 1991.

Stierlin familiarized his students with the interdisciplinary discourses and research results in the field of etiology and pathogenesis of schizophrenic diseases. This includes the work of Gregory Bateson, Wilfred Bion, Murray Bowen, Hilde Bruch, Noam Chomsky, Albert Ellis, George L. Engel, Erik H. Erikson, Milton Erickson, Sándor Ferenczi, Frieda Fromm-Reichmann, Stanislav Grof, Ronald Grossarth-Maticek, Jay Haley, Heinz Hartmann, Bärbel Inhelder, Don D. Jackson, Edith Jacobson, Otto Kernberg, Melanie Klein, Ronald D. Laing, Alexander Mitscherlich, Harry Stack Sullivan, Norbert Wiener and Lyman Wynne.

Stierlin succeeded in organizing interdisciplinary advanced training congresses in Heidelberg, including physicians, psychologists, neurobiologists, molecular biologists, sociologists, communication science, computer science, cybernetics, linguists and other interdisciplinary researchers came to exchange ideas with their colleagues and the student body through lectures and seminars. Among many other scientists, the lecturers Fritjof Capra, Heinz von Foerster, Ernst von Glasersfeld, Niklas Luhmann, Francisco Varela, Paul Watzlawick and Joseph Weizenbaum were guests in Heidelberg.

Stierlin was co-founder of the Systemic Family Therapy Program at the Psychotherapeutic Institute Bergerhausen founded by Hans-Werner Gessmann. Since 2002 exists the Helm Stierlin Institute hsi, one of the leading training institutes for systemic therapy and consulting in Germany. Emerging from the Heidelberg School of Systemic Therapy founded by Helm Stierlin in 1975 the hsi in Haus Schmeil, a large old villa located in a park near Heidelberg Castle, has since been training experts in health care, social work, education, management consulting and other human services in the theory and practice of various systemic consulting approaches.

== Awards ==
- 1985: Distinguished Professional Contribution to Family Therapy Award from the American Association for Marriage and Family Therapy.

== Literature ==
- Helm Stierlin: Der Begriff der Verantwortung. Versuch einer Erörterung der pragmatischen Wissenschaftsethik John Deweys in Gegenüberstellung mit der Ethik Kants unter Berücksichtigung von Max Webers Wissenschaftsbegriff. Dissertation zur Erlangung der Doktorwürde an der Philosophischen Fakultät der Ruprecht–Karl–Universität, Heidelberg 1950.
- Helm Stierlin: Der gewalttätige Patient. Eine Untersuchung über die von Geisteskranken an Ärzten und Pflegepersonen verübten Angriffe. Inaugural–Dissertation an der Medizinischen Fakultät der Ludwig-Maximilians-Universität München, München 1955. S. Karger Verlag, Basel (Schweiz) 1956.
- Helm Stierlin: Das Tun des Einen ist das Tun des Anderen. Eine Dynamik menschlicher Beziehungen. Suhrkamp, Frankfurt am Main 1976, ISBN 3-518-36813-3.
- Helm Stierlin: Eltern und Kinder: Das Drama von Trennung und Versöhnung im Jugendalter. Suhrkamp 1980, ISBN 978-3518371183.
- Helm Stierlin: Delegation und Familie. Beiträge zum Heidelberger familiendynamischen Konzept, Suhrkamp 1982, ISBN 3-518-37331-5.
- Helm Stierlin: Individuation und Familie: Studien zur Theorie und therapeutischen Praxis. 1st edition Suhrkamp 1989, 2nd edition, Suhrkamp 1994, ISBN 978-3518287385.
- Helm Stierlin: Ich und die anderen. Psychotherapie in einer sich wandelnden Gesellschaft. Klett-Cotta, 1994, ISBN 3-608-91631-8.
- Helm Stierlin: Christsein hundert Jahre nach Nietzsche. Systemisch-therapeutische Perspektiven. Verlag Welbrück 2001, ISBN 978-3934730281.
- Helm Stierlin: Oh, dass sie ewig grünen bliebe!- Ein systemisches Paar-Brevier für anhaltendes Glück in Versen und Bildern. Carl Auer Verlag 2002, ISBN 978-3896702746.
- Helm Stierlin with Gunthard Weber: In Liebe entzweit. Ein systemischer Ansatz zum Verständnis und zur Behandlung der Magersuchtfamilie. Carl Auer Verlag 2003, ISBN 978-3896702005.
- Helm Stierlin with Ronald Grossarth-Maticek: Krebsrisiken – Überlebenschancen: Wie Körper, Seele und soziale Umwelt zusammenwirken. 1st edition Heidelberg 1998; 3rd edition, Carl-Auer-Verlag, Heidelberg 2006, ISBN 978-3896705341.
- Helm Stierlin with Ingeborg Rücker-Embden, Norbert Wetzel, Michael Wirsching: Das erste Familiengespräch: Theorie - Praxis - Beispiele. Klett-Cotta 2002, ISBN 978-3608943313.
- Helm Stierlin: Die Demokratisierung der Psychotherapie. Bilanz eines großen Psychotherapeuten. Klett-Cotta, 2003, ISBN 3-608-96003-1.
- Helm Stierlin: Ob sich das Herz zum Herzen findet: Ein systemisches Paar-Brevier in Versen und Bildern. Carl-Auer-Systeme-Verlag, Heidelberg 2006.
- Helm Stierlin: Gerechtigkeit in nahen Beziehungen. Carl-Auer-Verlag, 3rd edition, Heidelberg 2006, ISBN 978-3896705341.
- Helm Stierlin: Psychoanalyse - Familientherapie - systemische Therapie. Entwicklungslinien, Schnittstellen, Unterschiede. Klett-Cotta, 2006, ISBN 3-608-94036-7.
- Helm Stierlin: Nietzsche, Hölderlin und das Verrückte: Systemische Exkurse. Carl Auer Verlag 2008, ASIN: B0772PGQBL.
- Helm Stierlin: Haltsuche in Haltlosigkeit.
- Helm Stierlin: Sinnsuche im Wandel. Herausforderungen für Psychoanalytik und Gesellschaft. Eine persönliche Bilanz. Carl-Auer-Verlag, Heidelberg 2010, ISBN 978-3-89670-754-3.
- Hans Rudi Fischer, Gunthard Weber (Hrsg.): Individuum und System: für Helm Stierlin. Suhrkamp 2000, ISBN 978-3518290491.
