= Jochen Fahrenberg =

German psychologist (1937–2026)

Jochen Fahrenberg (18 September 1937 – 21 September 2026) was a German psychologist in the fields of Personality, psychophysiology and philosophy of science.

== Background ==
Jochen Fahrenberg was born in Berlin on 18 September 1937. He studied psychology, sociology and philosophy in Freiburg, London and Hamburg, followed by a PhD at the University of Freiburg. His dissertation was based on an experimental investigation and factor analysis of writing movement parameters (graphometry). After working as a research assistant to cardiologist Professor Ludwig Delius in Bad Oeynhausen, he completed his postdoctoral thesis (habilitation) on Psychophysiological personality research in Freiburg in 1966.

Together with Dr. med. Michael Myrtek, he founded the Freiburg Psychophysiology Research Group in 1970 with funding from the Volkswagen Foundation. In 1973, he was offered the Chair at the Psychology Department previously held by his academic teacher, the philosopher and psychologist Robert Heiß, founder of the Freiburg Institute. During the following decades he was involved in the Institute's considerable expansion as well as academic reform. In 2002, as professor emeritus, he retired from his dual function as head of the Personality Research section and co-director of the Psychophysiology Research Group in the Department of Psychology at Albert-Ludwigs-University in Freiburg, Germany.

Fahrenberg died on 21 September 2026, at the age of 89.

== Research ==
During its 35-year history, the Psychophysiology Research Group was a centre for multivariate psychophysiological research on personality, research on cardiovascular rehabilitation, illness behaviour, and life satisfaction. The laboratory was generously supported by the Volkswagen Foundation (with eight scientific and technical staff, two computer-based electrophysiological labs and a clinical-chemistry lab). The research group also developed and promoted both methodology and techniques of ambulatory monitoring (ambulatory assessment) to assist behavioural research in everyday situations. A number of tests and personality scales were developed, one of which, the Freiburg Personality Inventory (FPI), comparable to the 16 PF Questionnaire, is the most frequently used in German-speaking countries.

A series of extensive laboratory analyses and field research was conducted focusing on cardiovascular psychophysiology, in particular. Hans Eysenck's Theory of Emotionality (emotional lability, neuroticism), which was generally accepted at that time, was critically tested in a number of experimental and clinical studies. The findings contradicted the assumed (hypothetical) correlation between specific personality factors (questionnaire scales) and autonomic lability (hyperreactivity of the autonomic nervous system).

A second focus of his research was Ambulant Assessment (ambulatory monitoring): psychophysiological examinations under everyday conditions, also during work and leisure periods, with multi-channel digital systems for recording behavioural, physiological and subjective data. The research group's list of publications consists of more than 400 references (Fahrenberg & Myrtek, 2005); the most important research data have been collected and made available (open access).

His later work was devoted to other areas: psychological anthropology – including surveys on student attitudes and belief systems, or assumptions about human nature and the impact of philosophical concepts on professional issues – the philosophy of science, methodology, categories in psychology; and theoretical psychology. In addition, a number of books and articles were written about Wilhelm Wundt, a pioneer of modern psychology. This series was completed on the 100th anniversary of Wundt's death with a Centennial review of Wundt's work, its reception and topicality.

Fahrenberg initiated the Workshop for Psychophysiological Methods in 1972, which became the German Society for Psychophysiology and its Application in 1982. Workshops on ambulatory assessment in Freiburg led to the founding of the international Society for Ambulatory Assessment in 2009.

== Awards ==
Honorary member of the German Society for Psychology (DGP)
Honorary member of the German Society for Psychophysiology and its Application (DGPA)
Psychological Anthropology Award 2011, Dr. Margrit Egnér Foundation, Zürich.

== Selected publications ==
- Fahrenberg, J., (1967). Psychophysiologische Persoenlichkeitsforschung (Psychophysiological personality research). Goettingen: Hogrefe.
- Fahrenberg, J., Hampel, R., & Selg, H. (1970). Das Freiburger Persoenlichkeitsinventar FPI-R. Handanweisung (Freiburg Personality Inventory Manual). (8th ed. 2010). Goettingen: Hogrefe.
- Fahrenberg, J., & Foerster, F. (1982). Covariation and consistency of activation parameters. Biological Psychology, 15, 151-169.
- Fahrenberg, J. (1986). Psychophysiological individuality: A pattern analytic approach to personality research and psychosomatic medicine. Advances in Behaviour Research and Therapy, 8, 43-100.
- Fahrenberg, J. (1988). Psychophysiological processes. In J. R. Nesselroade, & R. B. Cattell (Eds.), Handbook of multivariate experimental psychology (2nd ed., pp. 867–914). New York: Plenum. ISBN 0-306-42526-2
- Fahrenberg, J. (1992). Psychophysiology of neuroticism and anxiety. In A. Gale, & M. W. Eysenck (Eds.), Handbook of individual differences: Biological perspectives (pp. 179–226). Chichester: Wiley. ISBN 0-471-91155-0.
- Fahrenberg, J., & Myrtek, M. (Eds.). (1996). Ambulatory assessment. Computer-assisted psychological and psychophysiological methods in monitoring and field studies. Seattle, WA: Hogrefe & Huber. ISBN 0-88937-167-9.
- Foerster, F., & Fahrenberg, J. (2000). Motion pattern and posture: Correctly assessed by calibrated accelerometers. Behavior Research Methods, Instruments, & Computers, 32, 450-457.
- Fahrenberg, J., & Myrtek, M. (Eds.). (2001). Progress in ambulatory assessment. Seattle, WA: Hogrefe & Huber. ISBN 0-88937-225-X.
- Fahrenberg, J. (2002). Psychologische Interpretation. Biographien – Texte – Tests (Psychological interpretation. Biographies – Texts – Tests). Bern: Huber. ISBN 3-456-83897-2. PsyDok ZPID
- Fahrenberg, J., Leonhart, R., & Foerster, F. (2002). Alltagsnahe Psychologie mit hand-held PC und physiologischem Mess-System (Psychology in daily life using a hand-held PC and physiological recorder). Bern. Huber. ISBN 3-456-83818-2. PsyDok ZPID
- Fahrenberg, J., & Steiner, J. M (2004). Adorno und die authoritaere Persoenlichkeit (Adorno and the Authoritarian Personality). Kölner Zeitschrift für Soziologie und Sozialpsychologie, 56, 127-152. PsyDok ZPID
- Fahrenberg, J., & Myrtek, M. (2005). Psychophysiologie in Labor, Klinik und Alltag. 40 Jahre Projektarbeit der Freiburger Forschungsgruppe Psychophysiologie – Kommentare und Neue Perspektiven (Psychophysiology in the laboratory, clinic, and daily life. 40 years’ research in the Freiburg Psychophysiology Research Group – Commentaries and new perspectives). Frankfurt am Main: Lang. ISBN 3-631-54229-1. PsyDok ZPID
- Fahrenberg, J. (2007). Menschenbilder. Psychologische, biologische, interkulturelle und religioese Ansichten. Psychologische und Interdisziplinaere Anthropologie (Concepts of man. Psychological, cross-cultural, and religious perspectives. Psychological and interdisciplinary anthropology). e-book. PsyDok ZPID
- Fahrenberg, J., & Cheetham, M. (2007). Assumptions about human nature and impact of philosophical concepts on professional issues. A questionnaire-based study with 800 students from psychology, philosophy, and science. Philosophy, Psychiatry, & Psychology, 14 (3), 183-214.
- Fahrenberg, J., Myrtek, M., Pawlik, K., & Perrez, M. (2007). Ambulatory Assessment – Monitoring Behaviour in Daily Life Settings. A Behavioural-Scientific Challenge for Psychology. European Journal of Personality Assessment, 23, 206-213.
- Prill, T., & Fahrenberg, J. (2007). New methods in ambulatory BP monitoring: Interactive monitoring and detection of posture and movement patterns. Behavior Research Methods, Instruments, & Computers, 39, 390-398.
- Fahrenberg, J. (2008). Gehirn und Bewusstsein. Neurophilosophische Kontroversen brain and consciousness. Neurophilosophical controversies. In S. Gauggel, & M. Herrmann (Eds.), Handbuch der Neuro- und Biopsychologie (pp. 28–43). Goettingen: Hogrefe. ISBN 978-3-8017-1910-4.
- Fahrenberg, J. (2011). Wilhelm Wundt – Pionier der Psychologie und Außenseiter? Leitgedanken der Wissenschaftskonzeption und deren Rezeptionsgeschichte (Wilhelm Wundt – pioneer in psychology and outsider? Basic concepts and their reception). e-book. PsyDok ZPID
- Fahrenberg, J. (2012). Wilhelm Wundts Wissenschaftstheorie. Ein Rekonstruktionsversuch (Wilhelm Wundt's theory of science. An attempt at reconstruction). Psychologische Rundschau, 63 (4), 228-238.
- Fahrenberg, J. (2013). Zur Kategorienlehre der Psychologie. Komplementaritaetsprinzip. Perspektiven und Perspektiven-Wechsel (On categories in psychology. Complementarity principle, perspectives, and perspective-taking). Lengerich: Pabst Science Publishers. ISBN 978-3-95853-799-6; ISBN 978-3-89967-891-8. PsyDok ZPID
- Fahrenberg, J. (2015). Wilhelm Wundts Neuropsychologie (Wilhelm Wundt's neuropsychology). D. Emmans & A. Laihinen (Eds.). Comparative Neuropsychology and Brain Imaging: Commemorative publication in honour of Prof. Dr. Ulrike Halsband (pp. 348–373). Vienna; LIT-Verlag. ISBN 978-3-643-90653-3.
- Fahrenberg, J. (2015). Theoretische Psychologie – Eine Systematik der Kontroversen (Theoretical psychology – A system of controversies). Lengerich: Pabst Science Publishers. ISBN 978-3-95853-077-5. PsyDok ZPID
- Fahrenberg, J. (2017). The influence of Gottfried Wilhelm Leibniz on the Psychology, Philosophy, and Ethics of Wilhelm Wundt.PsyDok ZPID
- Fahrenberg, J. (2019). Wilhelm Wundt (1832 - 1920). Introduction, Quotations, Reception, Commentaries, Attempts at Reconstruction. Pabst Science Publishers, 2019. PsyDok
- Fahrenberg, J., Hampel, R., Selg, H.(2020). Freiburger Persönlichkeitsinventar. (9., vollständig überarbeitete Auflage mit neuer Normierung und Validitätshinweisen, Prinzipien der Testkonstruktion und modernen Assessmenttheorie). Goettingen: Hogrefe.
- Fahrenberg, J. (2020). "The influence of Gottfried Wilhelm Leibniz on the psychology, philosophy, and ethics of Wilhelm Wundt". e-Journal Philosophie der Psychologie, 26, 1–53. jp.philo.at
- Fahrenberg, J. & Stegie, R. (2002). Geschichte des Instituts für Psychologe in Freiburg i.Br. Ergänzt bis zum Jahr 2002. doi:10.23668/psycharchives.5157
- Fahrenberg, J. & Fahrenberg, A. (2021). Täterforschung nach Auschwitz. John M. Steiners Untersuchungen (1962 bis 2014). Dokumentationsband. PsychArchives doi:10.23668/psycharchives.5158
- Fahrenberg, J & Fahrenberg, A. (2022). Täterforschung nach Auschwitz. John Steiners Untersuchungen. Nachlass eines Auschwitz-Überlebenden. Pabst Science Publishers, Lengerich, ISBN 978-3-95853-800-9.
- Fahrenberg, J. (2022). Wilhelm Wundt (1832-1920). Eine Centenarbetrachtung 2022. PsychArchives
