= Michael Eysenck =

British psychologist (born 1944)

Michael William Eysenck (/ˈaɪzɛŋk/ EYE-zenk; born 8 February 1944) is a British academic psychologist, and is an Emeritus Professor in Psychology at Royal Holloway, University of London. He also holds an appointment as Professorial Fellow at Roehampton University. His research focuses on the interaction between anxiety and cognitive processes. Eysenck has written and co-written many publications, including several textbooks. In the late 1990s, he developed the theory of the "hedonic treadmill", stating that humans are predisposed by genetics to plateau at a certain level of happiness, and that the occurrence of novel happy events merely elevates this level temporarily.

He is the son of the psychologist Hans Jürgen Eysenck.

== Education ==
Eysenck attended Dulwich College.

== Research interests ==
Eysenck's research focuses mainly on cognitive factors associated with anxiety in normal and clinical populations. He has recently developed two new theories. First, there is attentional control theory (with Nazanin Derakshan, Rita Santos, and Manuel Calvo), which provides a cognitive account of the effects of anxiety on performance. Second, there is vigilance-avoidance theory (with Nazanin Derakshan and Lynn Myers), which provides a detailed theory of repressive coping. His current research with collaborators is designed to test these two theories in detail.

Specific interests: Cognitive factors in anxiety, including clinical anxiety and implications for therapy. Memory functioning and attentional mechanisms. Personality and mood. Modular approaches to trait anxiety.

== Career history ==
Eysenck was a Lecturer and then Reader in Psychology at Birkbeck, University of London between 1965 and 1987. Between 1987 and 2009 he was Professor of Psychology at Royal Holloway, University of London and Head of Department there between 1987 and 2005, and is now Emeritus Professor and Honorary Fellow at Royal Holloway. He has an additional appointment at Roehampton University that started in 2010. His main research area is anxiety and cognition, an area in which he has published approximately 100 journal articles and book chapters plus two research monographs. Overall, he has written 42 books, many of which are in the area of cognitive psychology, and have a grand total of over 200 publications

== Portrait ==
There is a photographic portrait of Hans and Michael Eysenck in the National Portrait Gallery permanent collection, by Anne-Katrin Purkiss.
