= Sybil B. G. Eysenck =

British psychologist

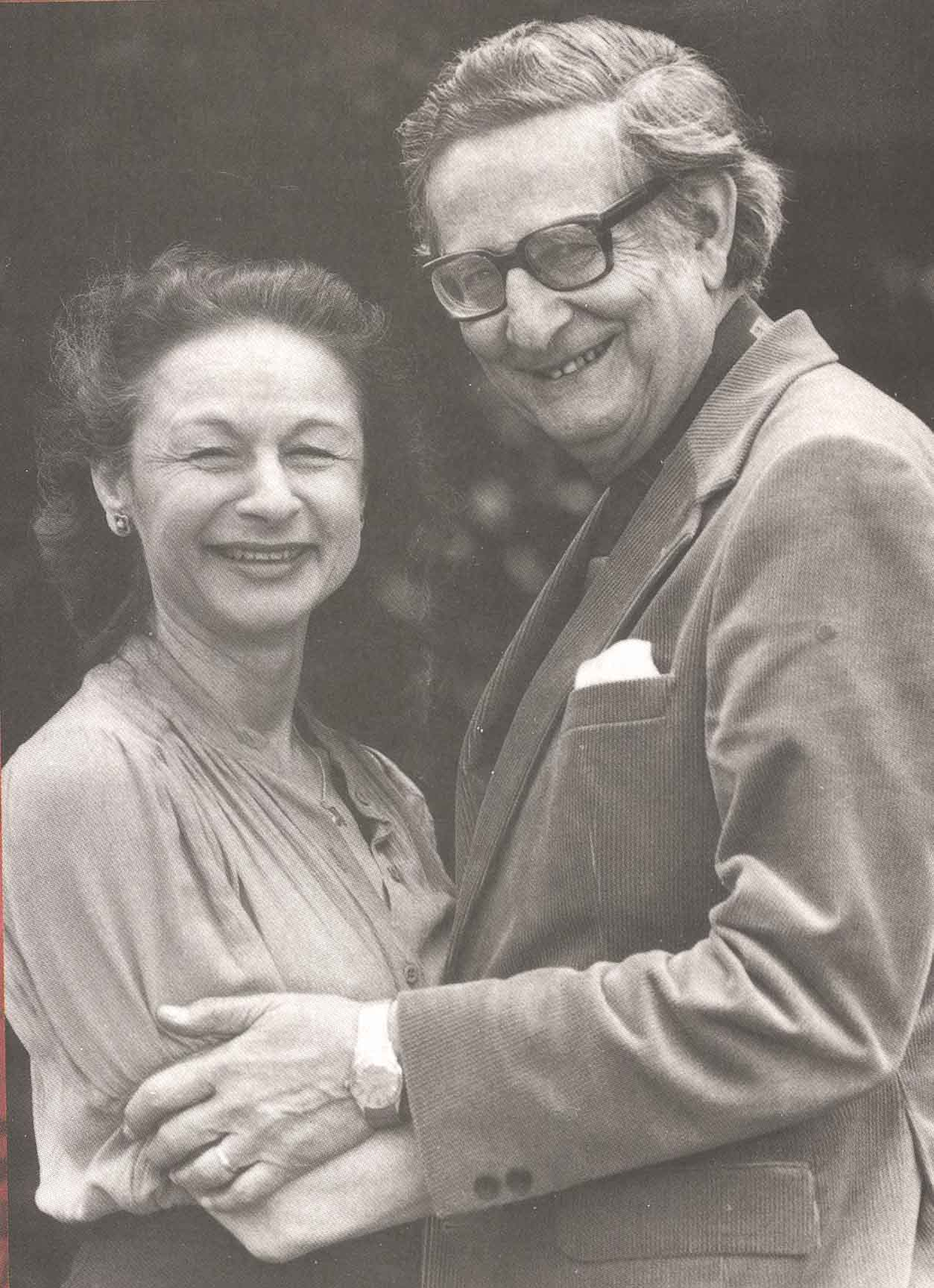
Sybil and Hans Eysenck

Sybille Bianca Giulietta Eysenck (/ˈaɪzɛŋk/ EYE-zenk; née Rostal; 16 March 1927 – 5 December 2020) was a British personality psychologist and spouse of psychologist Hans Eysenck, with whom she collaborated as psychologists at the Institute of Psychiatry, University of London, as co-authors and researchers.

== Life ==
Sybille Bianca Giulietta Rostal was born on 16 March 1927 as the only child of violinist Max Rostal and cellist Giesella "Sela" Trau (1898–1991) in Vienna. In 1934, she went with her parents into exile to Great Britain. In 1946, she became a naturalised British subject.

She received a BSc in psychology in 1952, and a PhD in psychology in 1955, both from the University of London. After a long career (1953–1992) as a psychologist and senior lecturer at the Institute of Psychiatry in London, England, she retired in 1992. She was the editor-in-chief of the Elsevier journal Personality and Individual Differences and the author of the Junior Eysenck Personality Inventory and its accompanying manuals.

Sybil Eysenck died on 5 December 2020 in London, England, at the age of 93.
