= Hans Eysenck =

German-born British psychologist (1916–1997)

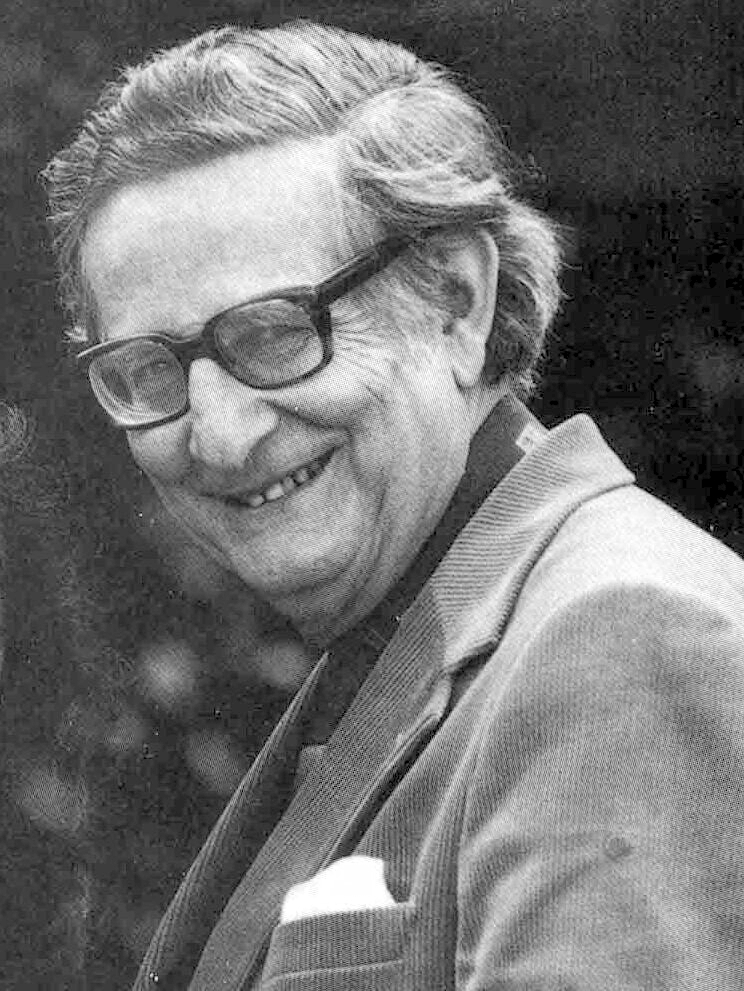
- Eysenck sometime between 1965 and 1975
- Born: Hans Jürgen Eysenck; 4 March 1916; Berlin, German Empire
- Died: 4 September 1997 (aged 81); London, England
- Citizenship: British
- Education: University College London (PhD)
- Known for: Intelligence, personality psychology, Eysenck Personality Questionnaire, differential psychology, education, psychiatry, behaviour therapy
- Scientific career
- Fields: Psychology
- Workplaces: Institute of Psychiatry; King's College London
- Thesis: An experimental and statistical investigation of some factors influencing aesthetic judgment (1940)
- Doctoral advisor: Cyril Burt
- Doctoral students: Jeffrey Alan Gray, Donald Prell

Hans Jürgen Eysenck (/ˈaɪzɛŋk/ EYE-zenk; 4 March 1916 – 4 September 1997) was a German-born British psychologist. He is best remembered for his work on intelligence and personality, although he worked on other issues in psychology. At the time of his death, Eysenck was the most frequently cited living psychologist in peer-reviewed scientific journal literature.

Eysenck's research included claims that certain personality types had an elevated risk of cancer and heart disease and research on IQ scores and race (first published in 1971), which were a significant source of controversy. Scholars have identified errors and suspected data manipulation in Eysenck's work, and large replications have failed to confirm the relationships that he purported to find.

An enquiry on behalf of King's College London found the papers by Eysenck coauthored with Ronald Grossarth-Maticek to be "incompatible with modern clinical science", with 26 of the joint papers considered suspect. Fourteen papers were retracted in 2020, and over 60 statements of concern were issued by scientific journals in 2020 about publications by Eysenck. David Marks and Rod Buchanan, a biographer of Eysenck, have argued that 87 publications by Eysenck should be retracted.

== Life ==
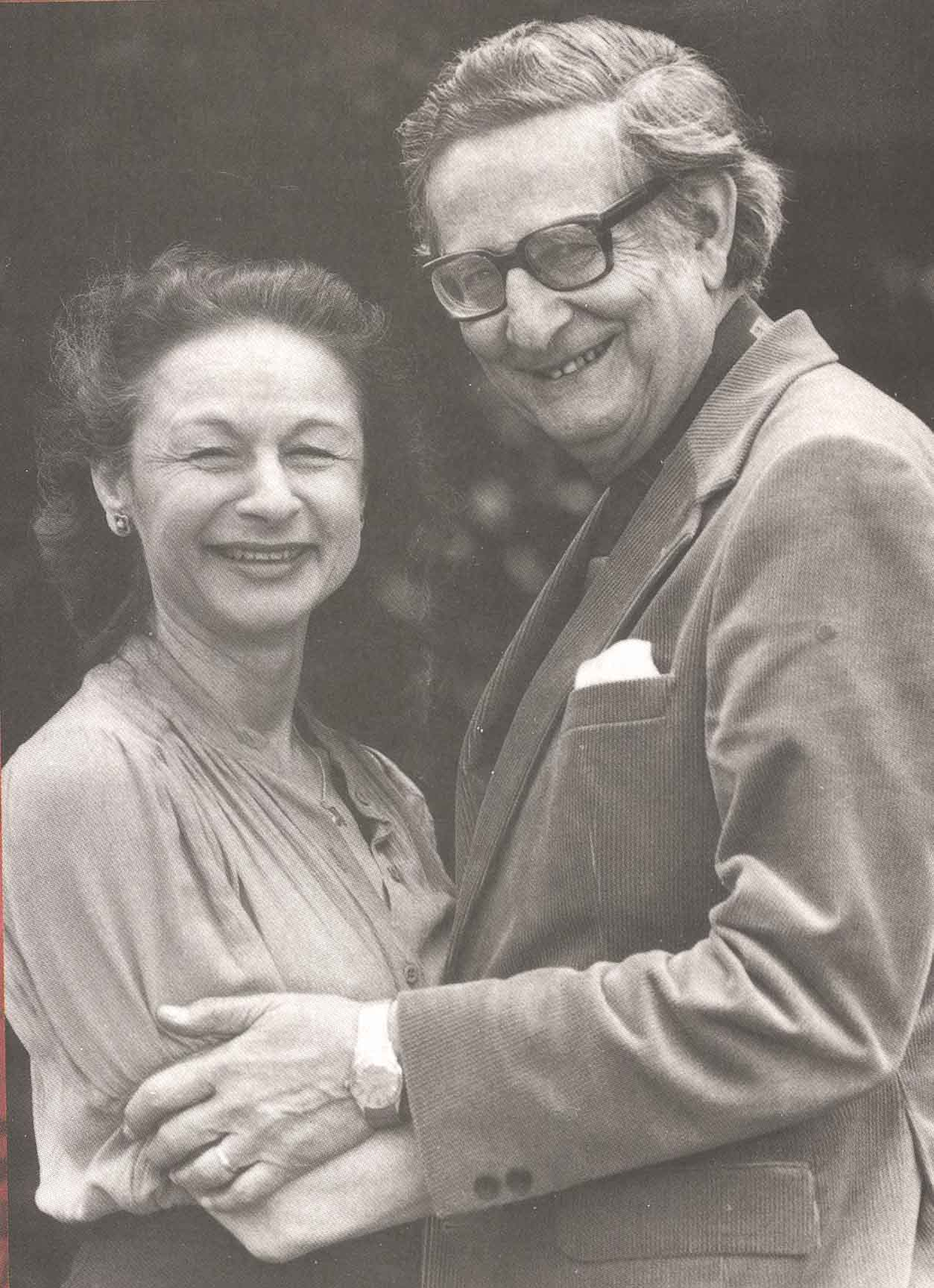
With his wife Sybil

Eysenck was born in Berlin, Germany. His mother was Silesian-born film star Helga Molander, and his father, Eduard Anton Eysenck, was an actor and nightclub entertainer who was once voted the "handsomest man on the Baltic coast". His mother was Lutheran and his father was Catholic. Eysenck was brought up by his maternal grandmother who was a Jewish convert to Catholicism. Subjected to the Nuremberg laws, she was deported and died in a concentration camp. An initial move to England in the 1930s became permanent because of his opposition to the Nazi party and its persecutions. "My hatred of Hitler and the Nazis, and all they stood for, was so overwhelming that no argument could counter it." Because of his German citizenship, he was initially unable to gain employment, and he came close to being interned during the war. He received his PhD in 1940 from University College London (UCL) working in the Department of Psychology under the supervision of Professor Sir Cyril Burt, with whom he had a tumultuous professional relationship throughout his working life.

Eysenck was Professor of Psychology at the Institute of Psychiatry, King's College London, from 1955 to 1983. He was a major contributor to the modern scientific theory of personality and helped find treatment for mental illnesses. Eysenck also created and developed a distinctive dimensional model of personality structure based on empirical factor-analytic research, attempting to anchor these factors in biogenetic variation. In 1981, Eysenck became a founding member of the World Cultural Council. He was the founding editor of the international journal Personality and Individual Differences, and wrote about 80 books and more than 1,600 journal articles. With his first wife, Hans Eysenck had a son Michael Eysenck, who is also a psychology professor. He had four children with his second wife, the psychologist Sybil B. G. Eysenck: Gary, Connie, Kevin, and Darrin. Hans and Sybil Eysenck collaborated as psychologists for many years at the Institute of Psychiatry, University of London, as co-authors and researchers. Sybil Eysenck died in December 2020, and Hans Eysenck died of a brain tumour in a London hospice in 1997. He was an atheist.

The Eysencks' home was at 10 Dorchester Drive, Herne Hill, London, from 1960 until their respective deaths.

== Views and their reception ==
Examples of publications in which Eysenck's views roused controversy include (chronologically):

- A paper in the 1950s concluding that available data "fail to support the hypothesis that psychotherapy facilitates recovery from neurotic disorder".
- A chapter in Uses and Abuses of Psychology (1953) entitled "What is wrong with psychoanalysis".
- The Psychology of Politics (1954)
- Race, Intelligence and Education (1971) (in the US: The IQ Argument).
- Sex, Violence and the Media (1978).
- Astrology – Science or Superstition? (1982).
- Decline and Fall of the Freudian Empire (1985).
- Smoking, Personality and Stress (1991).

Eysenck's attitude was summarised in his autobiography Rebel with a Cause: "I always felt that a scientist owes the world only one thing, and that is the truth as he sees it. If the truth contradicts deeply held beliefs, that is too bad. Tact and diplomacy are fine in international relations, in politics, perhaps even in business; in science only one thing matters, and that is the facts." He was one of the signers of the Humanist Manifesto.

=== The Psychology of Politics ===
In this book, Eysenck suggests that political behavior may be analysed in terms of two independent dimensions: the traditional left-right distinction, and how 'tenderminded' or 'toughminded' a person is. Eysenck suggests that the latter is a result of a person's introversion or extraversion respectively.

Colleagues critiqued the research that formed the basis of this book, on a number of grounds, including the following:

- Eysenck claims that his findings can be applied to the British middle class as a whole, but the people in his sample were far younger and better educated than the British middle class as a whole.
- Supporters of different parties were recruited in different ways: Communists were recruited through party branches, fascists in an unspecified manner, and supporters of other parties by giving copies of the questionnaire to his students and telling them to apply it to friends and acquaintances.
- Scores were obtained by applying the same weight to groups of different sizes. For example, the responses of 250 middle-class supporters of the Liberal Party were given the same weight as those of 27 working-class Liberals.
- Scores were rounded without explanation, in directions that supported Eysenck's theories.

=== Genetics, race and intelligence ===
Eysenck advocated a strong influence from genetics and race on IQ differences. Eysenck supported Arthur Jensen's questioning of whether variation in IQ between racial groups was entirely environmental. In opposition to this position, Eysenck was punched in the face by a protester during a talk at the London School of Economics. Eysenck also received bomb threats and threats to kill his young children.

Eysenck claimed that the media had given people the misleading impression that his views were outside the mainstream scientific consensus. Eysenck cited The IQ Controversy, the Media and Public Policy as showing that there was majority support for all of the main contentions he had put forward, and further claimed that there was no real debate about the matter among relevant scientists.

Regarding this controversy, in 1988 S. A. Barnett described Eysenck as a "prolific popularizer" and he exemplified Eysenck's writings on this topic with two passages from his early 1970s books:

All the evidence to date suggests the ... overwhelming importance of genetic factors in producing the great variety of intellectual differences which we observe in our culture, and much of the difference observed between certain racial groups.

— HJ Eysenck, Race, Intelligence and Education, 1971, London: Temple Smith, p. 130

the whole course of development of a child's intellectual capabilities is largely laid down genetically, and even extreme environmental changes ... have little power to alter this development. H. J. Eysenck The Inequality of Man, 1973, London: Temple Smith, pp. 111–12

Barnett quotes additional criticism of Race, Intelligence and Education from Sandra Scarr, who wrote in 1976 that Eysenck's book was "generally inflammatory" and that there "is something in this book to insult almost everyone except WASPs and Jews." Scarr was equally critical of Eysenck's hypotheses, one of which was the supposition that slavery on plantations had selected African Americans as a less intelligent sub-sample of Africans. Scarr also criticised another statement of Eysenck on the alleged significantly lower IQs of Italian, Spanish, Portuguese and Greek immigrants in the US relative to the populations in their country of origin. "Although Eysenck is careful to say that these are not established facts (because no IQ tests were given to the immigrants or nonimmigrants in question?") Scarr writes that the careful reader would conclude that "Eysenck admits that scientific evidence to date does not permit a clear choice of the genetic-differences interpretation of black inferiority on intelligence tests," whereas a "quick reading of the book, however, is sure to leave the reader believing that scientific evidence today strongly supports the conclusion that US blacks are genetically inferior to whites in IQ."

Some of Eysenck's later work was funded by the Pioneer Fund, an organization which promoted scientific racism.

=== Cancer-prone personality ===
Eysenck also received funding for consultation research via the New York legal firm Jacob & Medinger, which was acting on behalf of the tobacco industry. In a talk given in 1994 he mentioned that he asked Reynolds for funding to continue research. Asked what he felt about tobacco industry lawyers being involved in selecting scientists for research projects, he said that research should be judged on its quality, not on who paid for it, adding that he had not personally profited from the funds. According to The Independent newspaper, Eysenck received more than £800,000 in this way. Eysenck conducted many studies making claims about the role of personality in cigarette smoking and disease, but he also said "I have no doubt, smoking is not a healthy habit."

His article "Cancer, personality and stress: Prediction and prevention" defines Cancer-prone (Type C) personality. The science behind this claim has now come under public scrutiny in the 2019 King's College London enquiry (see below).

=== Genetics of personality ===
In 1951, Eysenck's first empirical study into the genetics of personality was published. It was an investigation carried out with his student and associate Donald Prell, from 1948 to 1951, in which identical (monozygotic) and fraternal (dizygotic) twins, ages 11 and 12, were tested for neuroticism. It is described in detail in an article published in the Journal of Mental Science. Eysenck and Prell concluded: "The factor of neuroticism is not a statistical artifact, but constitutes a biological unit which is inherited as a whole....neurotic predisposition is to a large extent hereditarily determined."

=== Model of personality ===
The two personality dimensions extraversion and neuroticism were described in his 1947 book Dimensions of Personality. It is common practice in personality psychology to refer to the dimensions by the first letters, E and N.

E and N provided a two-dimensional space to describe individual differences in behaviour. Eysenck noted how these two dimensions were similar to the four personality types first proposed by the Greek physician Galen.

- High N and high E = Choleric type
- High N and low E = Melancholic type
- Low N and high E = Sanguine type
- Low N and low E = Phlegmatic type

The third dimension, psychoticism, was added to the model in the late 1970s, based upon collaborations between Eysenck and his wife, Sybil B. G. Eysenck.

Eysenck's model attempted to provide detailed theory of the causes of personality. For example, Eysenck proposed that extraversion was caused by variability in cortical arousal: "introverts are characterized by higher levels of activity than extraverts and so are chronically more cortically aroused than extraverts". Similarly, Eysenck proposed that location within the neuroticism dimension was determined by individual differences in the limbic system. While it seems counterintuitive to suppose that introverts are more aroused than extraverts, the putative effect this has on behaviour is such that the introvert seeks lower levels of stimulation. Conversely, the extravert seeks to heighten his or her arousal to a more favourable level (as predicted by the Yerkes-Dodson Law) by increased activity, social engagement and other stimulation-seeking behaviours.

==== Comparison with other theories ====
Jeffrey Alan Gray, a former student of Eysenck's, developed a comprehensive alternative theoretical interpretation (called Gray's biopsychological theory of personality) of the biological and psychological data studied by Eysenck – leaning more heavily on animal and learning models. Currently, the most widely used model of personality is the Big Five model. The purported traits in the Big Five model are as follows:

1. Conscientiousness
2. Agreeableness
3. Neuroticism
4. Openness to experience
5. Extraversion

Extraversion and neuroticism in the Big Five are very similar to Eysenck's traits of the same name. However, what he calls the trait of psychoticism corresponds to two traits in the Big Five model: conscientiousness and agreeableness (Goldberg & Rosalack 1994). Eysenck's personality system did not address openness to experience. He argued that his approach was a better description of personality.

=== Psychometric scales ===
Eysenck's theory of personality is closely linked with the psychometric scales that he and his co-workers constructed. These included the Maudsley Personality Inventory (MPI), the Eysenck Personality Inventory (EPI), the Eysenck Personality Questionnaire (EPQ), as well as the revised version (EPQ-R) and its corresponding short-form (EPQ-R-S). The Eysenck Personality Profiler (EPP) breaks down different facets of each trait considered in the model. There has been some debate about whether these facets should include impulsivity as a facet of extraversion as Eysenck declared in his early work, or of psychoticism, as he declared in his later work.

=== Publication in far right-wing press ===
Eysenck was accused of being a supporter of political causes on the extreme right. Connecting arguments were that Eysenck had articles published in the German newspaper National-Zeitung, which called him a contributor, and in Nation und Europa, and that he wrote the preface to a book by a far-right French writer named Pierre Krebs, Das unvergängliche Erbe, that was published by Krebs' Thule Seminar. Linguist Siegfried Jäger interpreted the preface to Krebs' book as having "railed against the equality of people, presenting it as an untenable ideological doctrine." In the National Zeitung Eysenck reproached Sigmund Freud for alleged trickiness and lack of frankness. Other incidents that fuelled Eysenck's critics like Michael Billig and Steven Rose include the appearance of Eysenck's books on the UK National Front's list of recommended readings and an interview with Eysenck published by National Front's Beacon (1977) and later republished in the US neo-fascist Steppingstones; a similar interview had been published a year before by Neue Anthropologie, described by Eysenck's biographer Roderick Buchanan as a "sister publication to Mankind Quarterly, having similar contributors and sometimes sharing the same articles." Eysenck also wrote an introduction for Roger Pearson's Race, Intelligence and Bias in Academe. In this introduction to Pearson's book, Eysenck retorts that his critics are "the scattered troops" of the New Left, who have adopted the "psychology of the fascists". Eysenck's book The Inequality of Man, translated in French as L'Inegalite de l'homme, was published by GRECE's publishing house, Éditions Corpernic. In 1974, Eysenck became a member of the academic advisory council of Mankind Quarterly, joining those associated with the journal in attempting to reinvent it as a more mainstream academic vehicle. Billig asserts that in the same year Eysenck also became a member of the comité de patronage of GRECE's Nouvelle École.

Remarking on Eysenck's alleged right-wing connections, Buchanan writes: "For those looking to thoroughly demonize Eysenck, his links with far right groups revealed his true political sympathies." According to Buchanan, these harsh critics interpreted Eysenck's writings as "overtly racist". Furthermore, Buchanan writes that Eysenck's fiercest critics were convinced that Eysenck was "willfully misrepresenting a dark political agenda". Buchanan argued that "There appeared to be no hidden agenda to Hans Eysenck. He was too self-absorbed, too preoccupied with his own aspirations as a great scientist to harbor specific political aims."

As Buchanan commented:

Harder to brush off was the impression that Eysenck was insensitive, even willfully blind to the way his work played out in a wider political context. He did not want to believe, almost to the point of utter refusal, that his work gave succor to right-wing racialist groups. But there is little doubt that Jensen and Eysenck helped revive the confidence of these groups. [...] It was unexpected vindication from a respectable scientific quarter. The cautionary language of Eysenck's interpretation of the evidence made little difference. To the racialist right, a genetic basis for group differences in intelligence bore out racialist claims of inherent, immutable hierarchy.

According to Buchanan, Eysenck believed that the quality of his research would "help temper social wrongs and excesses". Eysenck's defence was that he did not shy away from publishing or being interviewed in controversial publications, and that he did not necessarily share their editorial viewpoint. As examples, Buchanan mentions contributions by Eysenck to pornographic magazines Mayfair and Penthouse.

Eysenck described his views in the introduction to Race, Education and Intelligence:

My recognition of the importance of the racial problem, and my own attitudes of opposition to any kind of racial segregation, and hatred for those who suppress any sector of the community on grounds of race (or sex or religion) were determined in part by the fact that I grew up in Germany, at a time when Hitlerism was becoming the very widely held doctrine which finally prevailed and led to the deaths of several million Jews whose only crime was that they belonged to an imaginary "race" which had been dreamed up by a group of men in whom insanity was mixed in equal parts with craftiness, paranoia with guile, and villainy with sadism.

=== Parapsychology and astrology ===
Eysenck believed that empirical evidence supported parapsychology and astrology. He was criticised by scientific skeptics for endorsing fringe science. Henry Gordon for example stated that Eysenck's viewpoint was "incredibly naive" because many of the parapsychology experiments he cited as evidence contained serious problems and were never replicated. Magician and skeptic James Randi noted that Eysenck had supported fraudulent psychics as genuine and had not mentioned their sleight of hand. According to Randi, he had given "a totally-one sided view of the subject". In 1983, Eysenck and Carl Sargent published their book Know Your Own Psi-IQ, which was designed to test readers' extrasensory perception abilities. According to Randi, "the authors instead gave users a highly biased procedure that would make experiments meaningless and certainly discourage further investigation by the amateur."

=== Later work ===
In 1994, he was one of 52 signatories on "Mainstream Science on Intelligence", an editorial written by Linda Gottfredson and published in The Wall Street Journal, which described the consensus of the signing scholars on issues related to intelligence research following the publication of the book The Bell Curve. Eysenck included the entire editorial in his 1998 book Intelligence: A New Look.

== Posthumous reevaluation ==
Eysenck's work has undergone reevaluation since his death.

Psychologist Donald R. Peterson noted in letters written in 1995 and published in 2005 that years earlier he had stopped trusting Eysenck's work after he tried to replicate a study done in Eysenck's lab and concluded that the results of the original study must have been "either concocted or cooked".

=== 2019 King's College London enquiry ===
In 2019 the psychiatrist Anthony Pelosi, writing for the Journal of Health Psychology, described Eysenck's work as unsafe. Pelosi described some of Eysenck's work as leading to "one of the worst scientific scandals of all time", with "what must be the most astonishing series of findings ever published in the peer-reviewed scientific literature" and "effect sizes that have never otherwise been encountered in biomedical research." Pelosi cited 23 "serious criticisms" of Eysenck's work that had been published independently by multiple authors between 1991 and 1997, noting that these had never been investigated "by any appropriate authority" at that time. The reportedly fraudulent papers covered the links between personality and cancer. Grossarth and Eysenck claimed the existence of a "cancer prone personality" were supposed to have a risk of dying of cancer 121 times greater than controls, when exposed to the carcinogen physical factor tobacco smoking. Bosely (2019): The "heart disease-prone personality" exposed to physical risk factors is asserted to have 27 times the risk of dying of heart disease as controls. Pelosi concluded "I honestly believe, having read it so carefully and tried to find alternative interpretations, that this is fraudulent work."

Pelosi's writing prompted additional analysis from other academics and journalists. Citing Pelosi, psychologist David F. Marks wrote an open letter (also published in the Journal of Health Psychology) calling for the retraction or correction of 61 additional papers by Eysenck. In 2019, 26 of Eysenck's papers (all coauthored with Ronald Grossarth-Maticek) were "considered unsafe" by an enquiry on behalf of King's College London. It concluded that these publications describing experimental or observational studies were unsafe. It decided that the editors of the 11 journals in which these studies appeared should be informed of their decision. All of the 26 papers were cited in Marks' open letter.

Diagram of Anthony Pelosi's view and accusation against the Eysenck's perspective on personality and cancer as characterized by critics

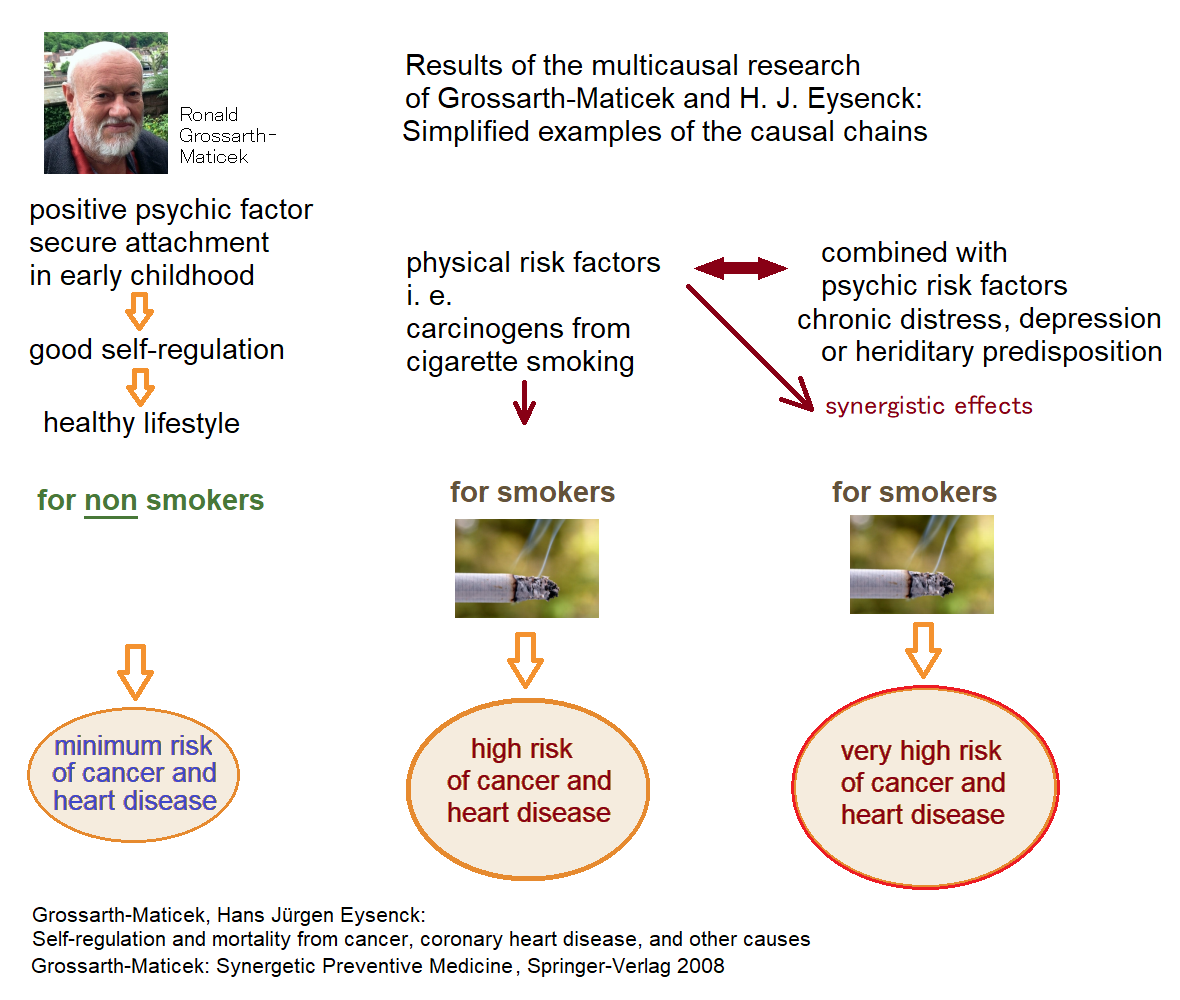
Research findings by Grossarth-Maticek

The publications under discussion were criticized, among other things, for the reason that Eysenck's research work was partly financed by the tobacco industry and he therefore may have had an interest to show an association between personality and cancer (instead of an association of smoking and cancer). Eysenck said in 1990, "Note that I have never stated that cigarette smoking is not causally related to cancer and coronary heart disease; to deny such a relationship would be irresponsible and counter to the evidence. I have merely stated that the available evidence is insufficient to prove a causal relationship, and this I believe to be true." In his statement at the time, Eysenck failed to take into account the highly addictive effect of nicotine, which was only later clearly proven by neurophysiological studies.

Grossarth emphasized that the development of disease is often multicausal, whereby the factors reinforce each other in their effect, and he explicitly speaks of behavioral characteristics that may change due to psychological intervention, for example, to overcome addictive behavior and, through better self-regulation, to favor other sources of pleasure and well-being. Grossarth emphasises the changeability through cognitive behavioral therapy in his intervention studies. Noting that Eysenck died many years ago and cannot defend himself, Grossarth-Maticek wrote a rebuttal and announced legal actions.

Following the King's College London enquiry the International Journal of Sport Psychology retracted a paper that was coauthored by Eysenck in 1990. Later, 13 additional papers were retracted. As of the end of 2020, there had been fourteen retractions and seventy-one expressions of concern on papers from as far back as 1946. Some of these are early papers having nothing to do with health and the King's College enquiry "did not specifically name the articles this expression of concern relates to as problematic".

== Portraits ==
There are five portraits of Eysenck in the permanent collection of the National Portrait Gallery, London, including photographs by Anne-Katrin Purkiss and Elliott and Fry.

== Biographies ==
- Buchanan, Roderick D. (2010). Playing with Fire: The Controversial Career of Hans J. Eysenck. Oxford University Press. ISBN 978-0-19-856688-5., review in: Rose, Steven (August 2010). "Hans Eysenck's controversial career". The Lancet. 376 (9739): 407–408. doi:10.1016/S0140-6736(10)61207-X.
- Corr, P. J. (2016). Hans Eysenck: A Contradictory Psychology. Macmillan Education-Palgrave. ISBN 978-0-230-24940-0.
- Eysenck, Hans (1997). Rebel with a cause. Transaction Publishers. ISBN 978-1-56000-938-2.
- Gibson, H. B. (1981). Hans Eysenck: The man and his work. Peter Owen. ISBN 978-0-7206-0566-2.

== Works ==
=== Books ===
- Dimensions of Personality (1947)
- The Scientific Study of Personality (1952)
- The Structure of Human Personality (1952) and later editions
- Uses and Abuses of Psychology (1953)
- The Psychology of Politics (1954)
- Psychology and the Foundations of Psychiatry (1955)
- Sense and Nonsense in Psychology (1956)
- The Dynamics of Anxiety and Hysteria (1957)
- Perceptual Processes and Mental Illnesses (1957) with G. Granger and J. C. Brengelmann
- Manual of the Maudsley Personality Inventory (1959)
- Know Your Own I.Q. (1962)
- Crime and Personality (1964) and later editions
- Manual of the Eysenck Personality Inventory (1964) with S. B. G. Eysenck
- The Causes and Cures of Neuroses (1965) with S. Rachman
- Fact and Fiction in Psychology (1965)
- Smoking, Health and Personality (1965)
- Check Your Own I.Q. (1966)
- The Effects of Psychotherapy (1966)
- The Biological Basis of Personality (1967)
- Eysenck, H. J. & Eysenck, S. B. G. (1969). Personality Structure and Measurement. London: Routledge.
- Readings in Extraversion/Introversion (1971) three volumes
- Race, Intelligence and Education (1971) in US as The IQ Argument
- Psychology is about People (1972)
- Lexicon de Psychologie (1972) three volumes, with W. Arnold and R. Meili
- The Inequality of Man (1973). German translation Die Ungleichheit der Menschen. Munich: Goldman. 1978. With an introduction by Eysenck.
- Eysenck, Hans J.; Wilson, Glenn D. (1973). The Experimental Study of Freudian Theories. London: Methuen.
- Eysenck, Hans J.; Wilson, Glenn D. (1976). Know your own personality. Harmondsworth, Eng. Baltimore etc: Penguin Books. ISBN 978-0-14-021962-3.
- Manual of the Eysenck Personality Questionnaire (1975) with S. B. G. Eysenck
- Eysenck, Hans J.; Wilson, Glenn D. (1976). A Textbook of Human Psychology. Lancaster: MTP Press.
- Sex and Personality (1976)
- Eysenck, H. J. & Eysenck, S. B. G. (1976). Psychoticism as a Dimension of Personality. London: Hodder and Stoughton.
- Reminiscence, Motivation and Personality (1977) with C. D. Frith
- You and Neurosis (1977)
- Die Zukunft der Psychologie (1977)
- Eysenck, Hans J.; Nias, David K. B. (1979). Sex, violence, and the media. New York: Harper Collins. ISBN 978-0-06-090684-9.
- The Structure and Measurement of Intelligence (1979)
- Eysenck, Hans J.; Wilson, Glenn D. (1979). The psychology of sex. London: J. M. Dent. ISBN 978-0-460-04332-8.
- The Causes and Effects of Smoking (1980)
- Mindwatching (1981) with M. W. Eysenck, and later editions
- The Battle for the Mind (1981) with L. J. Kamin, in US as The Intelligence Controversy
- Personality, Genetics and Behaviour (1982)
- Explaining the Unexplained (1982, 2nd edition 1993) with Carl Sargent
- H. J. Eysenck & D. K. B. Nias, Astrology: Science or Superstition? Penguin Books (1982), ISBN 0-14-022397-5
- Know Your Own Psi-Q (1983) with Carl Sargent
- …'I Do'. Your Happy Guide to Marriage (1983) with B. N. Kelly.
- Personality and Individual Differences: A Natural Science Approach (1985) with M. W. Eysenck
- Decline and Fall of the Freudian Empire (1985)
- Rauchen und Gesundheit (1987)
- The Causes and Cures of Criminality (1989) with G. H. Gudjonsson
- Genes, Culture and Personality: An Empirical Approach (1989) with L. Eaves and N. Martin
- Mindwatching (1989) with M. W. Eysenck. Prion, ISBN 1-85375-194-4
- Genius: The natural history of creativity (1995). Cambridge University Press, ISBN 0-521-48014-0
- Intelligence: A New Look (1998)

=== Edited books ===
- Handbook of Abnormal Psychology (1960), later editions
- Experiments in Personality (1960) two volumes
- Behaviour Therapy and Neuroses (1960)
- Experiments with Drugs (1963)
- Experiments in Motivation (1964)
- Eysenck on Extraversion (1973)
- The Measurement of Intelligence (1973)
- Case Histories in Behaviour Therapy (1974)
- The Measurement of Personality (1976)
- Eysenck, Hans J.; Wilson, Glenn D. (1978). The Psychological basis of ideology. Baltimore: University Park Press. ISBN 978-0-8391-1221-1.
- A Model for Personality (1981)
- A Model for Intelligence (1982)
- Suggestion and Suggestibility (1989) with V. A. Gheorghiu, P. Netter, and R. Rosenthal
- Personality Dimensions and Arousal (1987) with J. Strelau
- Theoretical Foundations of Behaviour Therapy (1988) with I. Martin

=== Other ===
- Preface to Pierre Krebs. Das Unverganglich Erbe

== See also ==
- Biological basis of personality
- EPQ
- Scientific racism
