= Nancy E. Davidson =

American oncologist

- Education: Harvard Medical School; Wellesley College
- Scientific career
- Workplaces: Seattle Cancer Care Alliance; Fred Hutchinson Cancer Research Center; University of Washington School of Medicine

Nancy E. Davidson is the executive director and president of Seattle Cancer Care Alliance, senior vice president, director of clinical oncology at Fred Hutchinson Cancer Research Center and head of the Division of Medical Oncology at the University of Washington School of Medicine. She focuses her research on breast cancer treatments and the genes that are mutated in various forms of breast cancer. She was president of American Association for Cancer Research from 2015 to 2016 and president of American Society of Clinical Oncology from 2007 to 2008.

Davidson received her BA from Wellesley College in 1975 and her MD from Harvard Medical School in 1979. She did a medical internship at University of Pennsylvania Hospital followed by a residency in internal medicine from 1980 to 1982. She then worked as a medical staff fellow at the National Cancer Institute from 1982 to 1985.

She was director of the University of Pittsburgh Cancer Institute from March 2009 to December 2016, when she became executive director of clinical oncology at the Fred Hutch/UW Cancer Consortium, senior vice president, member and director of the Clinical Research Division, and professor and head of the Division of Medical Oncology at University of Washington School of Medicine. She serves on the board of directors of the Ludwig Institute. She was appointed to the Board of Directors of the Andy Hill Cancer Research Endowment (CARE) Fund by Washington State Governor Jay Inslee in 2024.

== Awards ==
- 2008, recipient, AACR-Women in Cancer Research Charlotte Friend Award
- 2008, recipient, Rosalind E. Franklin Award for Women in Science, National Cancer Institute
- 2009, elected member, American College of Physicians
- 2009, recipient, Distinguished Alumna Award, Johns Hopkins University Alumni Association
- 2010, elected member, Association of American Physicians
- 2010, recipient, Gianni Bonadonna Breast Cancer Award, American Society of Clinical Oncology
- 2011, elected member, Institute of Medicine of the National Academy of Sciences
- 2016, elected fellow, American College of Physicians
- 2019, elected fellow, American Academy of Arts and Sciences.
