= Bay Freeway =

Bay Freeway was the name of two cancelled freeway projects in the United States, neither of which was ever built:

- The Bay Freeway (Milwaukee)
- The Bay Freeway (Seattle)
