= Thomas J. Lynch (academic) =

American oncologist

Thomas J. Lynch Jr. is an American oncologist, researcher, and the president and director of the Fred Hutchinson Cancer Center. He is known for his roles leading cancer research institutes and his contributions towards targeted cancer therapies.

== Education and career ==
Lynch earned a BS in biology from Yale College in 1982 and an MD from Yale School of Medicine in 1986. He completed his internal medicine residency at Massachusetts General Hospital and a medical oncology fellowship at Dana-Farber Cancer Institute. Lynch joined the staff of Massachusetts General Hospital. During that time, he was a founding physician of the Schwartz Center for Compassionate Healthcare as Kenneth Schwartz's oncologist. While at Harvard, he was also a professor of medicine at Harvard Medical School and the chief of hematology/oncology at Massachusetts General Hospital. His research was centered around precision cancer treatment of lung cancer and led several notable efforts in targeted oncology through mutations of the epidermal growth factor receptor (EGFR) gene.

Lynch was the director of the Yale Cancer Center from 2009 to 2015 and the physician in chief of the Smilow Cancer Hospital. In 2015, he returned to MGH as the chairman and chief executive officer of the Massachusetts General Physicians Organization. Lynch was the executive vice president and chief scientific officer of Bristol-Myers Squibb from 2017 until the acquisition of Celgene in 2019.

In 2020, Lynch was named the president and director of the Fred Hutchinson Cancer Center. In that role, he led the merger with the Seattle Cancer Care Alliance and formation of the Cancer AI Alliance.

== Personal life ==
Lynch grew up in Hackensack, New Jersey where his father was an oncologist. He is married to education writer Laura Pappano who also went to Yale.
