= Fred Hutchinson =

American baseball player and manager (1919–1964)

- Hutchinson with the Cincinnati Reds, c. 1964
- Pitcher / Manager
- Born: August 12, 1919; Seattle, Washington, U.S.
- Died: November 12, 1964 (aged 45); Bradenton, Florida, U.S.
- Batted: Left Threw: Right

MLB debut
- May 2, 1939, for the Detroit Tigers

Last MLB appearance
- September 27, 1953, for the Detroit Tigers

MLB statistics
- Win–loss record: 95–71
- Earned run average: 3.73
- Strikeouts: 591
- Managerial record: 830–827–9
- Winning %: .501
- Stats at Baseball Reference
- Managerial record at Baseball Reference

Teams
- As player: Detroit Tigers (1939–1940, 1946–1953); As manager: Detroit Tigers (1952–1954); St. Louis Cardinals (1956–1958); Cincinnati Reds (1959–1964)

Career highlights and awards
- All-Star (1951); Cincinnati Reds No. 1 retired; Cincinnati Reds Hall of Fame
Military career
Allegiance	United States
Branch	United States Navy
Service years	1941–1945
Rank	Lieutenant Commander
Conflicts	World War II

Frederick Charles Hutchinson (August 12, 1919 – November 12, 1964) was an American professional baseball pitcher and manager. He played for the Detroit Tigers of Major League Baseball (MLB) in 1939 and 1940, then took a five-season hiatus to serve in the United States Navy during World War II. After the war ended, he resumed playing for the Tigers from 1946–1953, playing in parts or all of ten seasons throughout his two stints. He was a player-manager of the Tigers for his last two playing years in 1952 and 1953, and then managed them again in 1954 after retiring as a player. He also managed the St. Louis Cardinals for three seasons (1956–1958) and the Cincinnati Reds for six seasons (1959–1964).

Born and raised in Seattle, Washington, Hutchinson was stricken with fatal lung cancer at the height of his managerial career as leader of the pennant-contending 1964 Cincinnati Reds. He was commemorated one year after his death when his surgeon brother, Dr. William Hutchinson (1909–1997), created the Fred Hutchinson Cancer Research Center in Seattle, as a division of the Pacific Northwest Research Foundation. The "Fred Hutch", which became independent in 1975, is now one of the best-known facilities of its kind in the world.

== Early years ==
Born in Seattle, Hutchinson was the youngest son of Dr. Joseph Lambert Hutchinson (1872–1951) and Nona Burke Hutchinson (1879–1962). Both were born in Wisconsin and they relocated to Seattle in 1907. A graduate of the medical school at Marquette University in Milwaukee, he was a general practitioner in the Rainier Beach area in the southeast part of Seattle. The oldest of the four Hutchinson children was daughter Mary Joy (Crosetto) (1904–1989).

Sons Bill and John were older than Fred by 10 and seven years, respectively, and both played baseball at Franklin High School and at the University of Washington in Seattle under head coach Tubby Graves. Bill captained the 1931 Huskies team which won the Pacific Coast Conference title and John (1912–1991) later played in the St. Louis Browns organization.

The older brothers mentored young Fred in the game and fostered a competitive spirit; they even taught him to hit left-handed to reach first base quicker. A catcher until he was 15, Hutchinson starred as a right-handed pitcher, catcher, first baseman, outfielder, and left-handed hitter at Franklin. He led the Quakers to four city championships and played American Legion ball in the summer.

== Pitching career ==
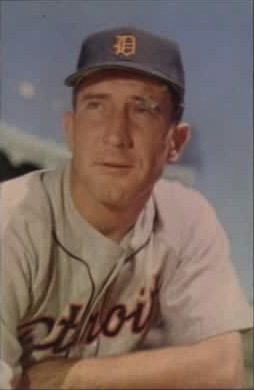
Hutchinson in 1953 photo

Hutchinson, known throughout baseball as Hutch, played semi-pro ball in 1937 in Yakima, attended UW briefly, then entered the organized baseball ranks in 1938 with the unaffiliated Seattle Rainiers of the AA Pacific Coast League. He caused an immediate sensation at age 19, winning a league-best 25 games and receiving The Sporting News Minor League Player of the Year Award.

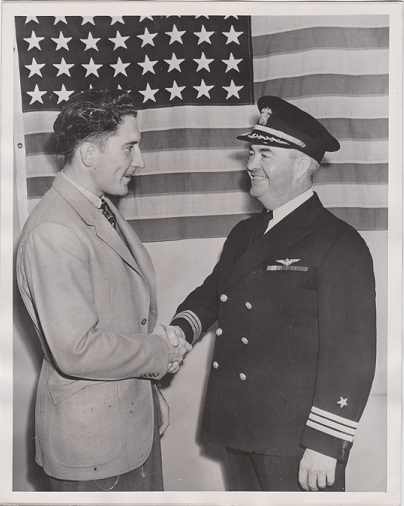
Hutchinson, age 22, is congratulated upon his 1941 enlistment in the U.S. Navy.

Several teams were interested in him, including the Pittsburgh Pirates. After his contract was purchased by the Detroit Tigers of the American League for players and cash, Hutchinson struggled in his early major league career with a 6–13 record and an earned-run average of 5.43 during the 1939–1941 seasons. His ineffectiveness caused his return to the minor leagues in each season. In 1941, at Buffalo of the AA International League, he enjoyed another stellar campaign, leading the league in victories (26) and innings pitched (284). A successful Major League career seemed to await Hutchinson, then 22, when the U.S. entered World War II. He saw active duty in the U.S. Navy, rose to the rank of lieutenant commander, and lost four full seasons (1942–1945) to military service.

In 1946, Hutchinson – approaching 27 – returned to baseball with a vengeance, winning a place in the defending World Series champion Tigers' starting rotation and beginning a string of six straight campaigns of 10 or more wins, including seasons of 18 (1947) and 17 victories (1950). He was selected to the 1951 American League All-Star team, and pitched three innings in an 8–3 loss at the Tigers' home park, Briggs Stadium.

In 11 major league seasons, Hutchinson compiled a 95–71 (.572) career record and a 3.73 earned run average, all with Detroit – a stellar mark considering his early-career mishaps. Appearing in 242 games, 169 as a starting pitcher, and 1,464 innings pitched, he allowed 1,487 hits and 388 bases on balls. He amassed 591 strikeouts, 81 complete games, and 13 shutouts, along with seven saves. He led the American League in WHIP in 1949, a season in which Hutchinson's 2.96 ERA was fourth in the league.

Hutchinson was known as a ferocious competitor. "His displays of temper became legendary in the American League", wrote Sports Illustrated in 1957. "'I always know how Hutch did when we follow Detroit into a town,' cracked Yankee catcher Yogi Berra. 'If we got stools in the dressing room, I know he won. If we got kindling, he lost.'" (Note: Hutchinson's disposition does not appear to have mellowed during his managerial career. As Phillies manager Gene Mauch noted in 1963, "Some managers throw chairs or bats or shoes. Hutch throws rooms.")

He also was one of the best-hitting pitchers of his time; a left-handed batter, he frequently pinch-hit and batted over .300 four times during his major league career. His career batting average was .263, with 171 hits, four home runs and 83 runs batted in — excellent totals for a pitcher.

On a dubious note, he is also recalled as the pitcher who gave up the longest homer in Ted Williams' career, a 502-foot (153 m) blast on June 9, 1946, that broke the straw hat of a startled fan sitting in Fenway Park's right-center-field bleachers. The seat where the home run landed has been painted red since to mark the long ball. Hutchinson led the AL in home runs allowed with 32 during the 1948 season.

== Career as manager ==
=== Detroit Tigers ===
A slow decline in Hutchinson's pitching career coincided with an alarming drop in the fortunes of his usually contending Tigers. On July 5, 1952, with Detroit in the surprising position of last place in the eight-team American League, the club fired manager Red Rolfe and handed the job to Hutchinson, still an active player and five weeks shy of his 33rd birthday. Hutchinson was chosen based on his leadership skills; he had been the AL's Player Representative since 1947. Hutchinson managed the Tigers for the next 2½ years, serving into 1953 as a playing manager. He guided them from their eighth-place finish in 1952 to sixth and fifth place during the next two seasons. His reign included the 1953 debut of future Baseball Hall of Fame outfielder Al Kaline. However, Detroit's ownership and front office were in flux; at the end of 1954, Hutchinson asked for a two-year contract, through 1956, and was only offered a single season deal. He left the Tigers, ending a 16-year association with the team.

=== Seattle Rainiers ===
Out of the majors for the first time since 1941, Hutchinson went home to Seattle and the Rainiers of the PCL, becoming their manager in 1955. Even though the club did not enjoy a major league affiliation, Hutchinson led Seattle to a 95–77 record and a first-place finish. His success led to his second major league managerial job when he replaced Harry Walker as skipper of the St. Louis Cardinals shortly after the 1955 season.

=== St. Louis Cardinals ===
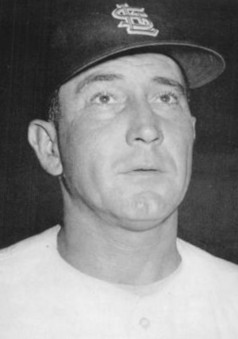
Hutchinson with the St. Louis Cardinals in 1957

The Cardinals, one of baseball's storied franchises, had fallen into the second division. With general manager "Frantic" Frank Lane constantly revamping the roster through trades and Hutchinson's steady hand at the helm, the Cardinals improved by eight games in 1956, and catapulted to second place in the National League in 1957, behind only the eventual world champion Milwaukee Braves.

Hutchinson won The Sporting News Manager of the Year Award, and his popularity in the Mound City resulted in a new nickname, "The Big Bear", bestowed by Cardinal broadcaster Joe Garagiola. Hutchinson's typical unsmiling expression also led Garagiola to joke that Hutchinson was "a happy guy inside, only his face didn't show it." He was given a raise in his one-year contract for the next season. However, Lane's departure from the front office and the Cardinals' disappointing season resulted in Hutchinson's dismissal; it came on September 17, with the team six games below .500 and in fifth place. Lane's successor, Bing Devine, strongly recommended retaining Hutchinson, but he was overruled by the Cardinals' owner, August A. Busch Jr.

=== Cincinnati Reds ===
Once again, Hutchinson returned to Seattle as field manager of the Rainiers, this time also serving as the club's general manager. The 1959 team did not have the on-field success of 1955's edition but the Rainiers were by then the top farm club of the Cincinnati Reds, who had stumbled badly in the National League standings coming out of the gate. On July 9, 1959, with the Reds 10 games under .500 at the All-Star break, Hutchinson was called to Cincinnati to take over the club, replacing Mayo Smith. Under Hutchinson, Cincinnati went 39–35 and improved two notches in the standings, but the following season saw the Reds struggle again to a 67–87 record and sixth-place finish. Like Detroit and St. Louis before, the Reds also were in front office turmoil, as the general manager who originally hired Hutchinson, Gabe Paul, departed for the expansion Houston Colt .45s and was replaced by Bill DeWitt. The sudden death of longtime owner Powel Crosley less than three weeks before the start of the 1961 regular season meant the team would soon be sold.

As a result, 1961 was a crucial season for Hutchinson. The Reds were projected as a second division team, lagging well behind the defending world champion Pittsburgh Pirates, the 1959 champion Los Angeles Dodgers, and strong San Francisco Giants, St. Louis Cardinals, and Milwaukee Braves outfits. But the Reds stunned the league, led by NL MVP Frank Robinson. They were buoyed by three other factors: the maturation of young players such as outfielder Vada Pinson and pitchers Jim O'Toole, Ken Hunt and Jim Maloney; the acquisition of key contributors such as pitcher Joey Jay (who became a 20-game winner) and third baseman Gene Freese; and surprise slugging and clutch hitting performances by first baseman Gordy Coleman, Jerry Lynch (one of the greatest pinchhitters in baseball history), and veteran Wally Post. The Reds surged into contention with a nine-game winning streak in May, and took first place for good August 16 when they swept the Dodgers in a doubleheader in Los Angeles.

The season was marked by numerous dramatic late-inning comeback victories, overcoming large margins, sometimes in a single inning. The Reds seemed never to be out of any game, until the last out. The 1961 Reds won 93 games and their first NL pennant since 1940. It was Hutchinson's second trip to the World Series; ironically, he was a Detroit pitcher in 1940 when his Tigers lost the Fall Classic to Cincinnati in seven games. However, the 1961 Reds drew one of the best teams of its era as its World Series foe: the New York Yankees of Roger Maris, Mickey Mantle, Whitey Ford, et al., who had won 109 games. The Reds could muster only one victory, in Game 2, with utility infielder Elio Chacón racing home on a passed ball with the go-ahead run, barely before the crunching body tag of Elston Howard. Cincinnati lost the 1961 Series in five games.

== Final years ==
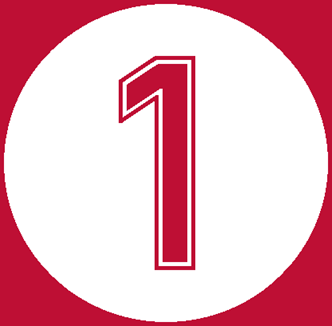
Fred Hutchinson's number 1 was retired by the Cincinnati Reds in 1964.

Winning the 1961 pennant secured Hutchinson's place in Cincinnati. In 1962, his Reds won 98 games but finished third, 3½ games behind the Giants. While the team fell to fifth in 1963, with an 86–76 mark, it continued to blend in young talent, such as young shortstop Leo Cárdenas and freshman second baseman Pete Rose, who was named the National League's Rookie of the Year. In July, Hutchinson was given a contract extension through the 1965 season, and with a solid corps of veterans and a strong farm system, the Reds were considered a contending club in 1964, provided that its pitching staff made a comeback.

=== Cancer ===
At his Florida home on Anna Maria Island, Hutchinson found a lump on his neck in late December 1963. A medical examination in Seattle revealed malignant tumors in his lungs, chest, and neck. Given the cancer treatments available at the time, the prognosis was grim. According to his brother, Hutchinson was a chain smoker, up to four packs of cigarettes a day. The Reds made their manager's illness public on January 3, 1964. After radiation treatment in early February, he still felt relatively well in March during spring training. As The Sporting News noted, the team played the 1964 season knowing Hutchinson "probably was at death's door."

His health failing, Hutchinson nevertheless managed the Reds through July 27, when he was hospitalized in Cincinnati. He returned to the dugout August 4, but could only endure nine more days before, on the day after his 45th birthday, he turned the team over to his first-base coach, Dick Sisler. The birthday was celebrated at Crosley Field on August 12, then he was re-hospitalized two days later for two weeks. With their manager now critically ill, the inspired Reds caught fire and won 29 out of their last 47 games as the first-place Philadelphia Phillies collapsed, but the team finished in a tie with the Phillies for second, one game behind the Cardinals, who went on to win that year's World Series.

Hutchinson formally resigned as manager on October 19, and died three weeks later at Manatee Memorial Hospital in Bradenton, Florida. He was buried next to his parents in the family plot at Mount Olivet Cemetery near Seattle in Renton, overlooking Lake Washington.

SPORT magazine posthumously named him "Man of the Year" for 1964 in tribute to his courage in battling his final illness and the Reds permanently retired his uniform number (1). The Hutch Award is given annually by Major League Baseball in his memory as well.

== Legacy ==
Hutchinson was inducted into the Cincinnati Reds Hall of Fame in 1965. His career record as a major league manager, in all or parts of 12 seasons, was 830–827 (.501) with nine tie games. He was remembered for his winning baseball teams, as the man who launched Cincinnati into an historic winning era (which culminated years after his death with the "Big Red Machine" in the 1970s). He is described favorably by pitcher/author Jim Brosnan in his two memoirs, The Long Season (an account of Brosnan's 1959 season) and Pennant Race (about the 1961 campaign). Brosnan describes the team's wariness of the manager's hot temper and its respect for his competitive nature and leadership skills, and notes Hutchinson's sense of humor as well.

Wrote Brosnan in 1959: "Most ballplayers respect Hutch. In fact, many of them admire him, which is even better than liking him. He seems to have a tremendous inner power that a player can sense. When Hutch gets a grip on things it doesn't seem probable that he's going to lose it. He seldom blows his top at a player, seldom panics in a game, usually lets the players work out of their own troubles if possible."

Said future Hall of Famer Stan Musial in 1957: "If I ever hear a player say he can't play for Hutch, then I'll know he can't play for anybody." Jim Delsing played under Hutchinson with the Tigers. "I would describe him as very sincere, very frank, very loyal to the players, and very involved with the players. I think everybody really liked playing for him. Hutch was not rehired after the 1954 season, and the next year we played for Bucky Harris. Fred was always more involved with the players. I thought he was an excellent manager. The manager makes a lot of difference."

In honor of his achievements with Buffalo, Hutchinson became a charter member of the Buffalo Baseball Hall of Fame in 1985.

On December 24, 1999, the Seattle Post-Intelligencer named Hutchinson Seattle's Athlete of the 20th Century.

Meanwhile, the Fred Hutchinson Cancer Center continues to make news as a cancer treatment hub — in medical and baseball circles. When Boston Red Sox rookie left-handed pitcher Jon Lester, a Washington native, was diagnosed with anaplastic large cell lymphoma during the 2006 season, he chose to undergo chemotherapy at the Seattle facility. Coming full circle, on November 11, 2008, Lester — a 16-game winner and postseason pitching star — was chosen as the winner of the 2008 Hutch Award.

All of the end plates of the rows of seats at Seattle's T-Mobile Park are embossed with a likeness of Hutchinson.

== Managerial Record ==
Team	Year	Regular season					Postseason			
Team	Year	Games	Won	Lost	Win %	Finish	Won	Lost	Win %	Result
DET	1952	82	27	55	.329	interim	–	–	–	
DET	1953	154	60	94	.390	6th in AL	–	–	–	
DET	1954	154	68	86	.442	5th in AL	–	–	–	
DET total		390	155	235	.397		0	0	–	
STL	1956	154	76	78	.494	4th in NL	–	–	–	
STL	1957	154	87	67	.565	2nd in NL	–	–	–	
STL	1958	144	69	75	.479	fired	–	–	–	
STL total		452	232	220	.513		0	0	–	
CIN	1959	74	39	35	.527	5th in NL	–	–	–	
CIN	1960	154	67	87	.435	6th in NL	–	–	–	
CIN	1961	154	93	61	.604	1st in NL	1	4	.200	Lost World Series (NYY)
CIN	1962	162	98	64	.605	3rd in NL	–	–	–	
CIN	1963	162	86	76	.531	5th in NL	–	–	–	
CIN	1964	109	60	49	.550	illness	–	–	–	
CIN total		815	443	372	.544		1	4	.200	
Total		1657	830	827	.501		1	4	.200	

== See also ==
- Hutch Award
- List of Major League Baseball managers with most career ejections
- List of Major League Baseball player-managers
- List of Major League Baseball players who spent their entire career with one franchise

== Notes ==
Preceded by Jerry Priddy; Connie Ryan	Seattle Rainiers manager 1955; 1959 (through July 8)	Succeeded by Luke Sewell; Alan Strange
