= Supply Laundry Building =

- U.S. National Register of Historic Places
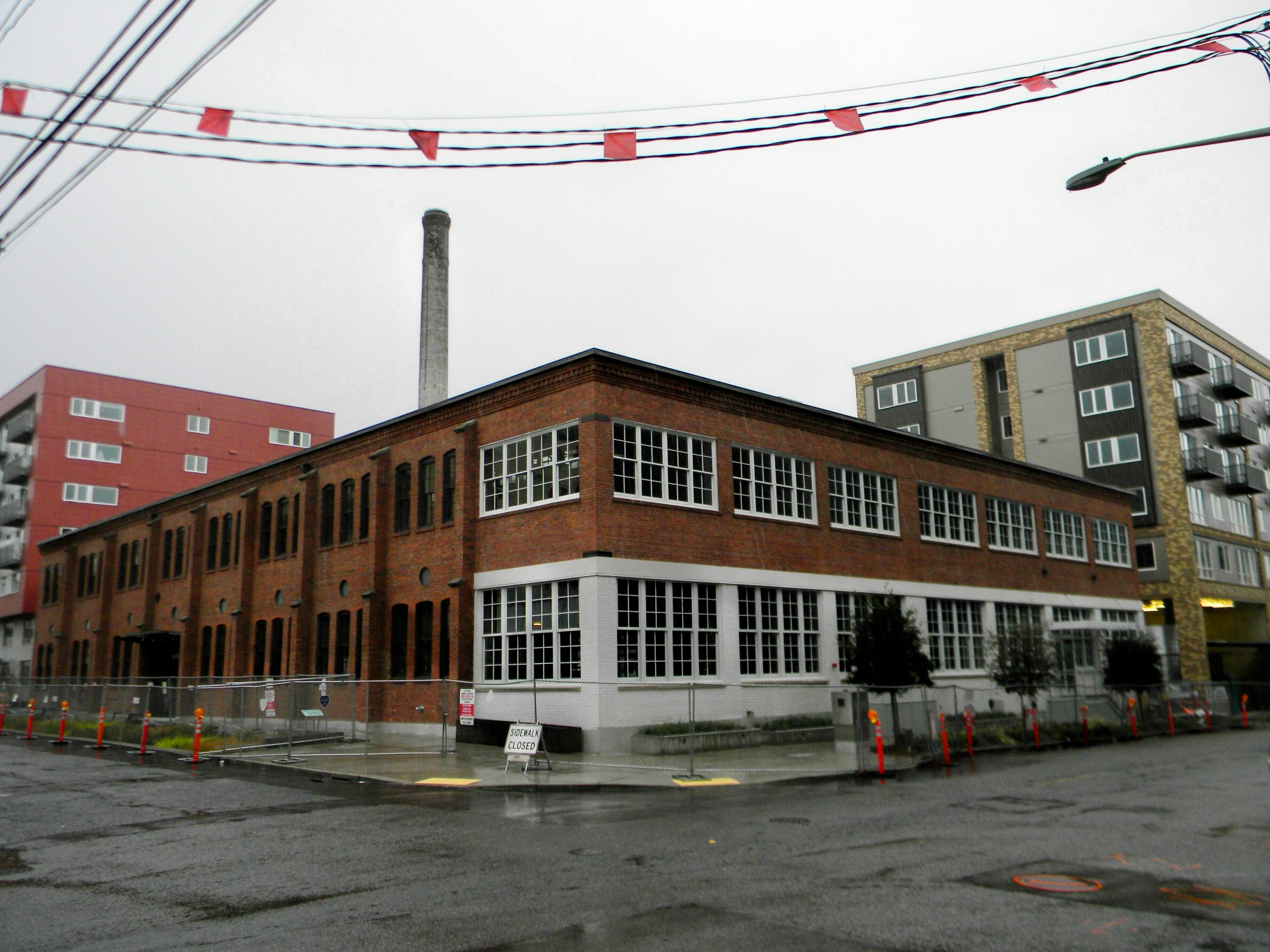
- Viewed from the northeast in 2013

- Location within Washington (state) Location within the United States
- Location: 1265 Republican St., Seattle, Washington
- Coordinates: 47°37′22.2″N 122°19′50.5″W
- Area: less than one acre
- Built: 1906
- Architect: Buchinger, T.; Van House, Max; Skoog, Joseph L.; Lamont & Fey
- NRHP reference No.: 13000209
- Added to NRHP: April 23, 2013

The Supply Laundry Building is a historic building in the Cascade neighborhood in South Lake Union, Seattle, Washington, United States, that is listed on the National Register of Historic Places.

It has now been converted into an Amazon office but retains the historical appearance of the historical building.

== See also ==
- National Register of Historic Places listings in Seattle, Washington
