= Pacific Northwest Diabetes Research Institute =

US non-profit medical research institute

Pacific Northwest Research Institute
- Formation: 1956; 70 years ago
- Type: Nonprofit organization
- Headquarters: Seattle, Washington, U.S.
- Website: pnri.org
- Formerly called: Pacific Northwest Diabetes Research Institute

The Pacific Northwest Research Institute (PNRI) is a private non-profit biomedical and clinical research institute in the northwest United States, located in Seattle, Washington.

Founded to investigate heart surgery, cancer, and endocrine diseases, its current focus is pioneering genetic research to find new solutions to improve human health.

== History ==
The first such institute in the Pacific Northwest, it was created in 1956 by William B. Hutchinson as the Pacific Northwest Research Foundation (PNRF). A second-generation physician, founder Hutchinson (1909–1997) was a surgeon and an older brother of Major League Baseball pitcher and manager Fred Hutchinson, who died of lung cancer at age 45 in 1964.

In 1972, PNRF received federal funding under the National Cancer Act of 1971 with the help of U.S. Senator Warren G. Magnuson to create in Seattle one of the 15 new cancer centers called for under 1971 Act; the Fred Hutchinson Cancer Research Center was founded in 1972 and its building opened 3 years later.

=== Name ===
The organization was founded in 1956 as the Pacific Northwest Research Foundation, whose name is still on the exterior of the building. In 1997 the organization changed its name to Pacific Northwest Research Institute. In 2008 the organization changed its name to Pacific Northwest Diabetes Research Institute. In 2017, the organization returned to the name, Pacific Northwest Research Institute.

== Staff ==
The institute has 85 employees in 6 investigative teams. The current president and CEO is John Wecker.

== Community involvement ==
Each year the institute hosts one of the Northwest's most successful wine events featuring one of the largest blind wine tasting games in the Puget Sound area. Boutique wineries from Washington State partner with the institute to make An Evening of Wine feature Washington State's latest varietals.
