= William B. Hutchinson =

American physician (1909–1997)

William B. Hutchinson (September 6, 1909 – October 26, 1997) was an American physician and surgeon, and the founder of both the Pacific Northwest Research Foundation and the Fred Hutchinson Cancer Center in his native Seattle, Washington. The latter facility is named in memory of his younger brother, Fred Hutchinson, a Major League Baseball pitcher and manager whose life and career were cut short by lung cancer in 1964 at the age of 45.

The son of a general practitioner, Hutchinson was raised in Seattle and attended the University of Washington, where he played baseball for the Huskies under head coach Tubby Graves and graduated in 1931. He passed up a professional baseball tryout to attend medical school at McGill University in Montreal and graduated in 1935. After completing his surgical residency in Baltimore, Maryland, Hutchinson returned to Seattle to practice.

His experience as a cancer surgeon led him to spearhead a drive for research and treatment centers for the disease in his native city. The PNRF, now the Pacific Northwest Diabetes Research Institute, was founded in 1956; the FHCC was created in 1965 and officially founded in 1975.
