= H. Joachim Deeg =

German-American physician

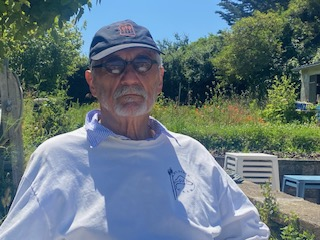
- Born: July 18, 1945 (age 81); Bad Mergentheim, Germany
- Education: University of Bonn
- Medical career
- Sub-specialties: Hematology, Oncology, Bone marrow transplantation

H. Joachim Deeg (born 18 July 1945) is a German-American hematologist and physician-scientist known for his work in hematopoietic stem cell transplantation, graft-versus-host disease, and the treatment of bone marrow failure syndromes, myelodysplastic syndromes (MDS), and myeloproliferative neoplasms (MPN). He is professor emeritus in the Clinical Research Division at the Fred Hutchinson Cancer Center and professor emeritus of Medicine at the University of Washington School of Medicine.

== Early life and education ==
Deeg was born in Bad Mergentheim, Germany. He attended the Deutschorden Gymnasium, graduating in 1965 at the top of his class. He initially studied law at the University of Marburg before switching to medicine, completing his studies at the Universities of Würzburg and Bonn, where he earned the Dr. med. degree in 1972.

== Career ==
After completing his medical studies in Germany, Deeg began his postgraduate training as a Medizinalassistent (intern) in medicine and surgery at the University of Bonn School of Medicine in 1972, followed by a surgical internship at Katharinen Hospital in Cologne-Frechen. He continued his residency in medicine at the University of Bonn before moving to the United States in 1973 to join the University of Rochester School of Medicine, where he served as an intern and resident at The Genesee Hospital and was appointed Chief Medical Resident in 1975. From 1976 to 1978, he trained as a fellow in oncology and hematology at the University of Washington School of Medicine under Nobel laureate E. Donnall Thomas.

Deeg joined the Fred Hutchinson Cancer Research Center in 1978, first as Associate in Medical Oncology and subsequently as Assistant Member (1979–1983) and Associate Member (1983–1986), while holding concurrent academic appointments in the Division of Oncology at the University of Washington School of Medicine. From 1986 to 1989, he was Professor of Medicine and Microbiology at Georgetown University, where he established and directed the Bone Marrow Transplantation Program at Georgetown University Hospital and was a member of the Lombardi Cancer Research Center.

Between 1988 and 1991, Deeg was Guest Scientist at Argonne National Laboratory, affiliated with the University of Chicago.

He returned to the Fred Hutchinson Cancer Research Center in 1990, becoming Associate Member in 1992 and Professor in 1994, a position he held until his retirement in 2023. He also served as Professor of Medicine at the University of Washington School of Medicine from 1994 to 2023.

== Research contributions ==
Deeg conducted experimental and clinical studies on the prevention and treatment of GVHD. He demonstrated the efficacy of cyclosporine alone and in combination with methotrexate, a regimen that became a worldwide standard in transplantation practice.

He was among the first to document the increased risk of secondary malignancies after TBI-based transplantation in both animal models and human patients. His findings influenced subsequent modifications of conditioning regimens using non-TBI modalities, and the development of preventive strategies against chronic GVHD.

Deeg advanced transplantation protocols for patients with severe aplastic anemia, particularly through studies optimizing TBI doses in unrelated donor transplants.

His group made key contributions to understanding MDS pathophysiology, including the roles of Fas signaling, TNF-α, FLIP isoforms, and stromal cell dysfunction. Clinically, he was instrumental in establishing transplantation as a curative approach for both MDS and MPN, and developed conditioning strategies using busulfan, cyclophosphamide, and later treosulfan.
