= Immanuel Lutheran Church (Seattle) =

Historic church in Washington, United States

- U.S. National Register of Historic Places
- Seattle Landmark
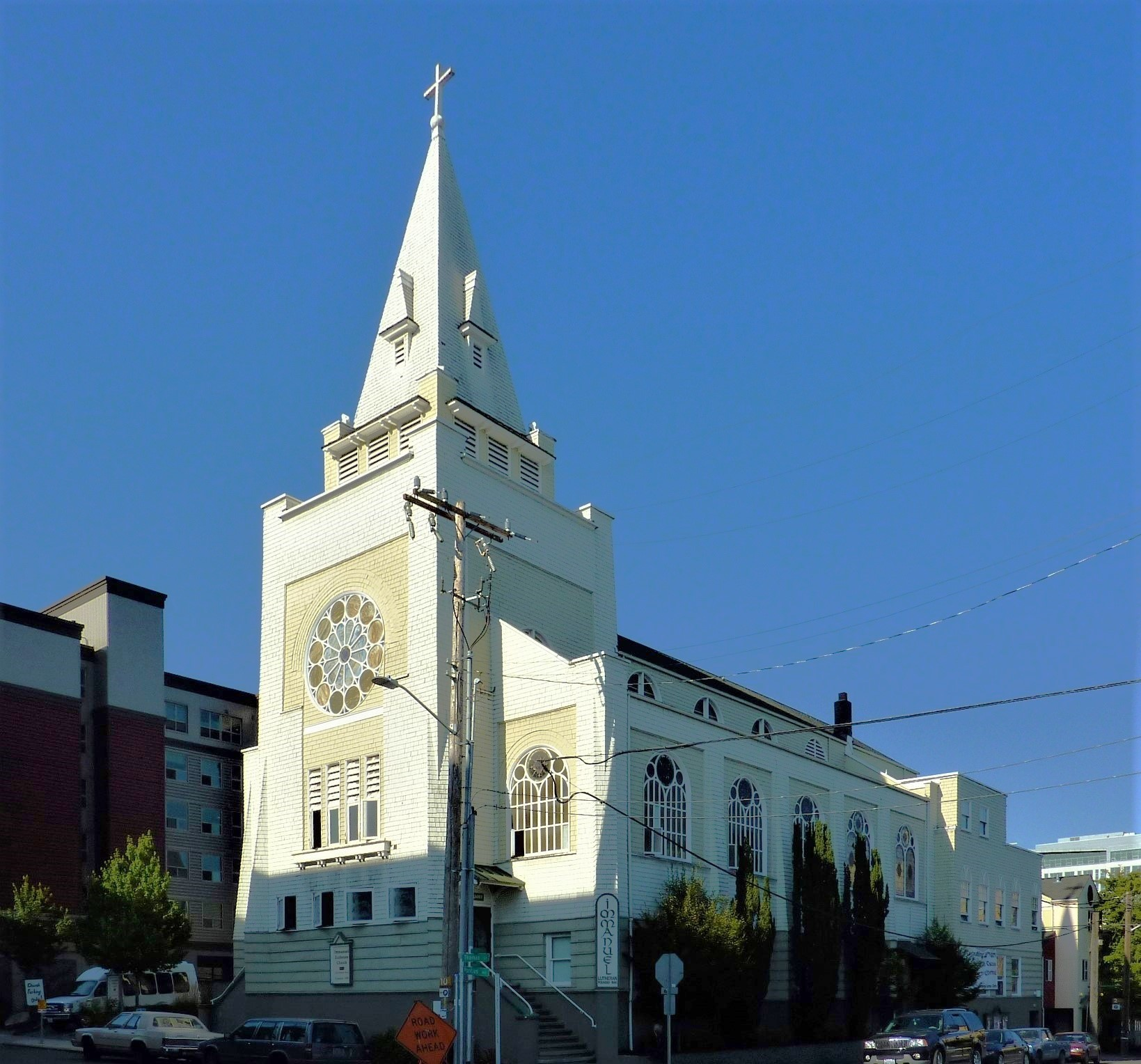

- Location within Washington (state) Location within the United States
- Location: 1215 Thomas St., Seattle, Washington
- Coordinates: 47°37′15″N 122°19′51″W
- Area: less than one acre
- Built: 1907
- Architect: Vernon, Watson
- NRHP reference No.: 82004239

Significant dates
- Added to NRHP: February 25, 1982
- Designated SEATL: March 2, 1981

Immanuel Lutheran Church is a historic church at 1215 Thomas Street in Seattle, Washington.

It was built in 1907 and added to the National Register in 1982.
