= PEMCO =

American mutual insurance company

PEMCO Mutual Insurance Company (aka PEMCO Insurance)
- Type: Mutual
- Industry: Insurance
- Founded: 1948
- Headquarters: Seattle, Washington, U.S.
- Area served: Washington; Oregon
- Key people: Stan W. McNaughton, President/CEO
- Products: Personal lines insurance – home, auto, boat, umbrella
- Revenue: $458.4 million (in 2017)
- Number of employees: 674
- Website: www.pemco.com

PEMCO Insurance is a personal-lines mutual insurance company based in Seattle, Washington that serves only Washington and Oregon residents.

== History ==
In 1936, Seattle school teacher Robert J. Handy took advantage of the newly legalized “credit union” concept to found Seattle Teachers Credit Union. Handy started the credit union with $5 in capital. Out of that enterprise grew a group of seven different but related companies, including PEMCO Insurance.

PEMCO has grown from premiums of $8,500 in 1949 to nearly $500 million in 2021.

Today, PEMCO is the Northwest’s largest local personal-lines insurer, providing auto, home, boat and umbrella coverage to the general public.

The current president and CEO of PEMCO Insurance is Stan W. McNaughton. He is the son of Stanley O. McNaughton, who served as CEO from 1985 until his death in 1998.

PEMCO serves customers from its Seattle headquarters in the South Lake Union tech district, and from a regional office in Spokane.

== Awards ==
PEMCO has earned several service and marketing-campaign awards in recent years, including:

- J.D. Power ranked PEMCO Insurance "highest in customer satisfaction among auto Insurers in the Northwest region," a five-state area, each year from 2013-2019.
- “Best Announcer," “Best Client Campaign,” “Best of Show” and others at the Soundies, sponsored by the Puget Sound Radio Broadcasters Association, in 2008, 2009 and 2010.
- Several showcase awards including the coveted SAMMY "Best of Show" top honor for the TV ad featuring "Northwest Profile #4: 4-Way Stop, You Go. No You Go. No You Go. Guy" awarded by the Insurance Marketing and Communications Association in 2009 and 2010.
