= Bay Freeway (Seattle) =

Unbuilt highway in Washington

- Mercer Street Connection
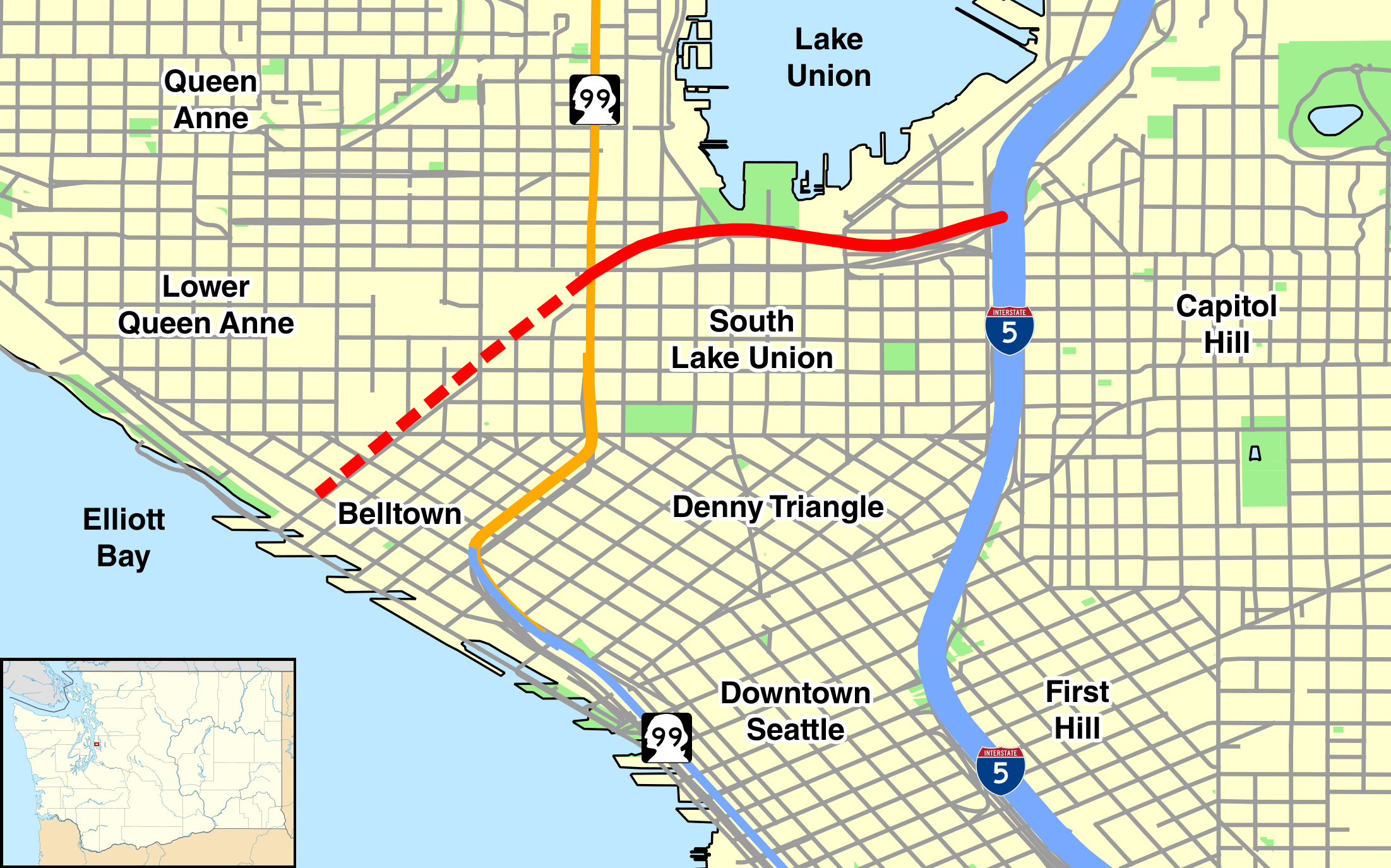

Route information
- Length: 0.7 mi (1,100 m)
- History: Canceled in 1972

Major junctions
- West end: SR 99 in Seattle
- East end: I-5 in Seattle

Location
- Country: United States
- State: Washington

Highway system
- State highways in Washington; Interstate; US; State; Scenic; Pre-1964; 1964 renumbering; Former

The Bay Freeway, also referred to as the Mercer Street Connection, was a proposed elevated freeway in the South Lake Union neighborhood of Seattle, Washington. The 0.7-mile-long (1.1 km) freeway would have run parallel to a section of Mercer Street between Interstate 5 (I-5) and Aurora Avenue North at the Seattle Center.

Planning for the freeway began in 1954, with the proposal for a freeway from Elliott Bay to the Central Freeway, later I-5, via Broad and Mercer streets added to the city's comprehensive plan in 1957. Funded by a bond measure passed by Seattle voters in 1960, plans were drawn for the newly renamed Bay Freeway to serve a multi-purpose stadium at the Seattle Center via an elevated structure.

Citizen groups voiced their opposition to the project at public hearings in 1967, forcing the Seattle Engineering Department to consider other designs. After determining that a cut-and-cover tunnel would not be feasible, a second series of public hearings to discuss the impact of an elevated option were held in 1970, leading to widespread controversy and a civil suit launched in opposition to the freeway. The lawsuit ended in November 1971, with a King County Superior Court judge ruling that a major deviation from the voter-approved 1960 plan occurred, forcing a referendum to be held on whether to continue the project.

On February 8, 1972, the Bay Freeway project was rejected by a 10,000-vote margin in a municipal referendum, alongside the repeal of the R.H. Thomson Expressway. Mercer Street would later undergo several projects that attempted to provide congestion relief promised by the rejected freeway, culminating in the Mercer Corridor Project in 2012, which widened the street into a boulevard.

== Route description ==
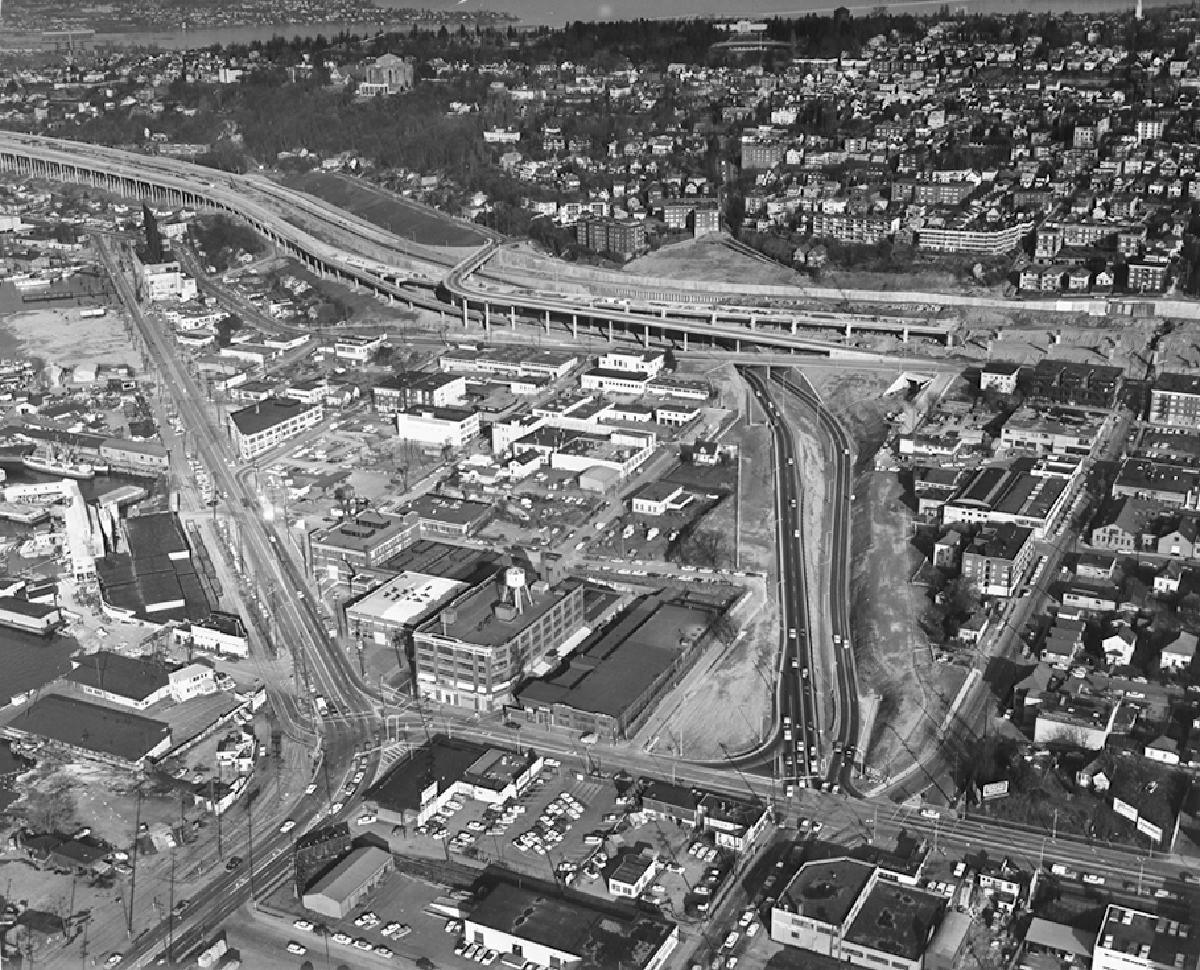
I-5's interchange with Mercer Street, the proposed eastern terminus of the Bay Freeway, under construction in 1962

The 0.7-mile-long (1.1 km) Bay Freeway, as proposed in 1972, would have been a six-lane elevated freeway on a curved box-beam bridge, measuring 180 feet (55 m) at its widest point. The freeway would have begun at the Seattle Center in Lower Queen Anne, as through lanes for Broad Street under Aurora Avenue North. The roadway would have immediately merged with ramps connecting to the Roy and Mercer couplet and to a parking garage for a multipurpose domed stadium, later relocated and built south of Downtown in 1976, to form the Bay Freeway. The lanes then would have then turned southeastward next to a park on Lake Union, passing only 16 feet (5 m) over Westlake Avenue North and 25 feet (8 m) over Fairview Avenue North, before splitting into ramps at an interchange with I-5. Valley Street, located 175 feet (53 m) north of the planned right-of-way, was to be moved under the Bay Freeway structure and replaced with additional park space.

Earlier plans called for an extension traveling southwest on Broad Street through Belltown, including a tunnel between 5th Avenue and Denny Way, to the proposed Northwest Expressway and an extension of the existing Alaskan Way Viaduct on the Elliott Bay waterfront. The extension was deferred in 1969, but remained a "possible future plan" until the entire project was canceled.

== History ==
=== Mercer Street expansion ===
External image
- Plan drawing of the Mercer Street Connection, as proposed in 1960. (Seattle Municipal Archives)

The City of Seattle began planning for the Bay Freeway in 1954, with planning studies determining that Broad and Mercer streets should become the northern east–west link of the proposed Downtown freeway system. The Seattle City Council adopted the city's comprehensive plan in 1957, proposing a "major highway" in the vicinity of Broad and Mercer streets from the Northwest Expressway along Elliott Bay to the Central Freeway at the foot of Capitol Hill. In anticipation of the Bay Freeway, underpasses of Aurora Avenue North on Broad and Mercer streets were completed in July 1958, using funds from a 1954 bond issue for the construction of arterial roadways. A special municipal election concerning a $26.6 million bond measure (equivalent to $215 million in 2024 dollars) for traffic improvement was held on March 8, 1960, passed by 71,000 of 109,000 voters in King County. The funds, matched by $31 million (equivalent to $251 million in 2024 dollars) from the State of Washington and federal government, were distributed to 12 projects from the Comprehensive Plan of 1957, including $1.9 million (equivalent to $15.4 million in 2024 dollars) for the "Mercer Street Connection" between Aurora Avenue and the Central Freeway.

The Century 21 Exposition was hosted at the Seattle Center grounds from April to October 1962, generating heavy traffic equivalent to rush hour loads on Mercer Street, where a city-owned, 1,500-stall parking garage was located. The use of Mercer Street as one of the primary routes to the fairgrounds and its selection as one of the sites for a proposed multi-purpose stadium convinced city officials that the construction of the Bay Freeway was a necessity. The Mercer exit on I-5 was partially opened in November 1963, with the northbound ramps open to traffic and the southbound ramps remaining closed until 1968. A design team led by Perry Johanson was formed in 1966 for the Bay Freeway project, intending to blend the freeway with its surroundings and encourage mixed-use development to lower its impact on the South Lake Union neighborhood. The first public hearing on the project was held by the Seattle City Council on February 17, 1967, where City Engineer Roy Morse said that the "Mercer mess" would be solved with the opening of the Bay Freeway in 1969. The three proposed elevated alternatives were criticized by the public and local architects Ibsen Nelsen and Victor Steinbrueck for blocking views of Lake Union, forcing Morse to reconsider subsurface designs despite his declaration that "a depressed roadway with the freeway would require excessively steep traffic grades".

=== Freeway proposals ===
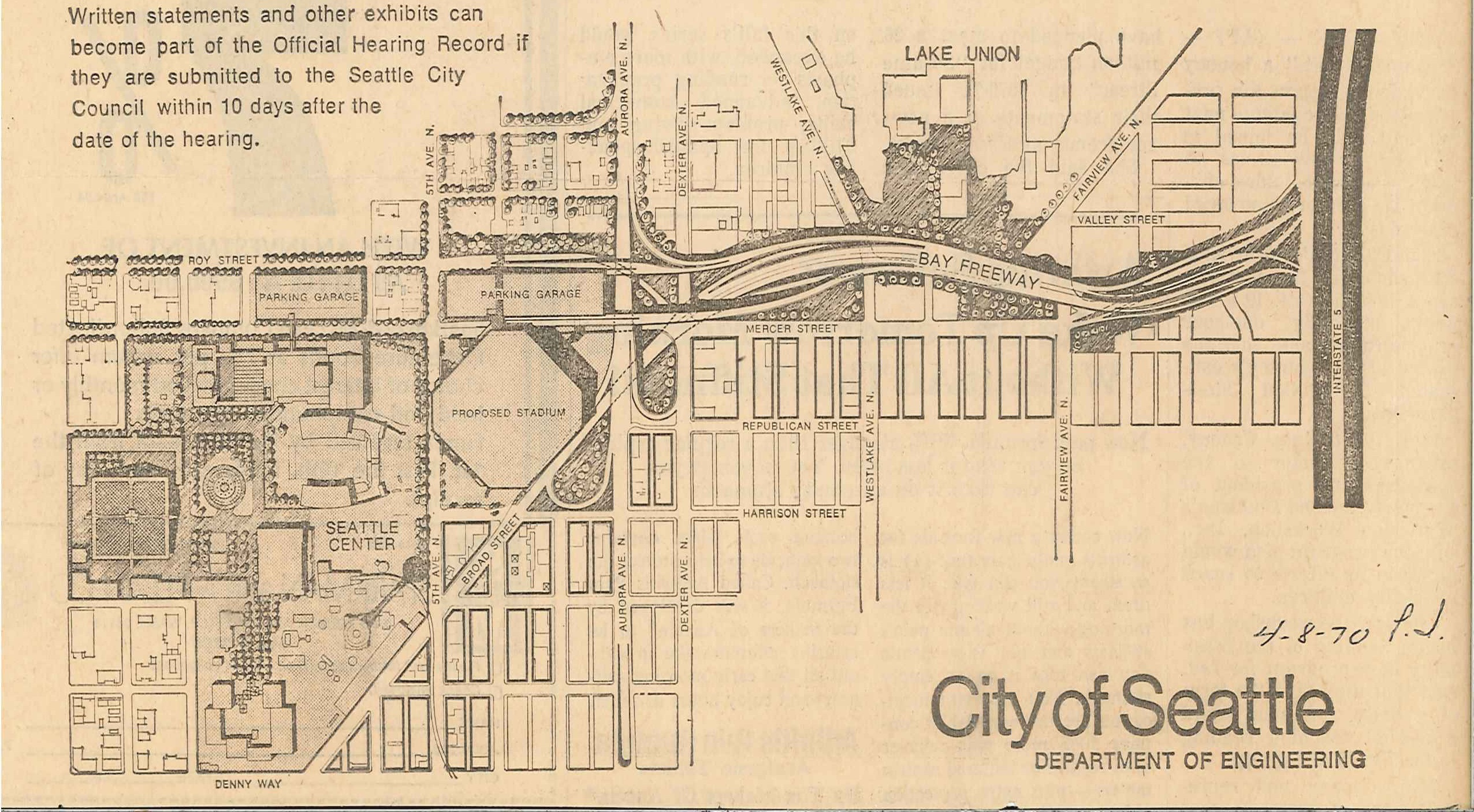
A map of the elevated option for the Bay Freeway, subject to public hearings in 1970

The project was officially designated the "Bay Freeway" by the Seattle City Council on April 12, 1967, as part of an ordinance that also renamed part of State Route 99 to the Alaskan Freeway and officially named the proposed R.H. Thomson Expressway as the Thomson Freeway. During the second public hearing, held on June 23, the city council endorsed the $5 million (equivalent to $35.8 million in 2024 dollars) elevated option for the Bay Freeway amid appeals from local architects and the Citizens Planning Council. Among the 16 proposals considered, a cut and cover tunnel was rejected because of its $16 million cost (equivalent to $115 million in 2024 dollars), steep grades and larger disruption of local businesses and railroads. The Seattle Center was selected as the preferred site of the multi-purpose domed stadium in 1968, assuming that the Bay Freeway was built to prevent event congestion, forcing the project to be redesigned for the next two years.

The design report for the Bay Freeway project was published on February 10, 1970, and was subsequently distributed to the project. The report featured a new design for the freeway, including ramps to a parking garage serving the domed stadium and aesthetic standards meant to complement the existing Seattle Center. Five additional public hearings were held by the Seattle City Council in 1970, as support for the R.H. Thomson Expressway and other proposed freeways were the subject of highway revolts similar to those in other American cities. During the April hearing, former State Department of Highways director Charles Prahl spoke out against the Bay Freeway and predicted that it would cause traffic to back up onto I-5 during rush hour. Voters rejected a Forward Thrust initiative that would have built the proposed domed stadium at the Seattle Center on May 19, removing one of the main reasons to build the freeway and forcing the city council to consider scaling down the proposal. The June hearing resulted in the removal of the R.H. Thomson Freeway from the comprehensive plan as well as the widening of the Bay Freeway to six lanes to support an expected 2,610 drivers during rush hour.

The city council approved $28 million (equivalent to $174 million in 2024 dollars) for the Bay Freeway proposal, to be matched by an additional $28 million from the federal government, by a 5–3 vote on December 21, 1970. Right of way acquisition began the following March, with $6 million (equivalent to $37.3 million in 2024 dollars) appropriated to purchase and condemn properties on seven blocks between Mercer and Valley streets.

=== Civil suit and special election ===
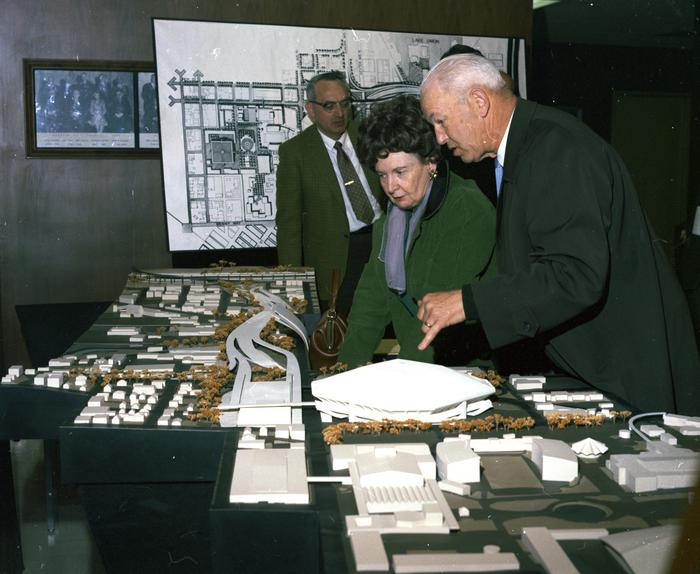
A model of the elevated Bay Freeway option produced for a public hearing

The 6-lane proposal caused several opposition groups, led by the Citizens Against R.H. Thomson (CARHT), to launch a civil suit to halt further planning for the Bay Freeway. The two citizens groups opposed what they claimed was improper planning and financing, described as "a series of shortcut procedures and hearings to give the design rubber-stamp approval", and that the project did not conform to the voter-approved 1960 proposal for a "Mercer Street Connection". CARHT was named the plaintiff in the case, using funds largely from an anonymous single donor that were originally meant for opposing the R.H. Thomson Expressway. On November 3, 1971, King County Superior Court Judge Solie M. Ringold ruled in favor of the opposition and prohibited the city from moving forward with the Bay Freeway project, citing that it had deviated significantly from the voter-approved 1960 proposal; the estimated cost of the project rose to $28 million (equivalent to $166 million in 2024 dollars), a seven-fold increase from 1960's figures. The city was allowed to reconsider plans and submit a new proposal for voter approval. The Council Committee of the Whole unanimously voted the following month to hold a special referendum seeking approval of the Bay Freeway, as well as endorsement of the city council's decision to cancel the R.H. Thomson Expressway, scheduled for February 8, 1972.

The final environmental impact statement for the project was published by the City of Seattle Department of Engineering on January 24, 1972, two weeks before the election. It included three alternatives, all elevated between Valley and Mercer streets from Aurora Avenue to I-5. Construction would begin the following spring, with a completion date in early 1975. A rapid transit alternative was deemed "not probable in the near future" for the corridor, though express bus service was considered. A depressed roadway was rejected outright, as it could only achieve a grade of 6% at 3,000 feet (914.40 m), required a larger amount of right-of-way acquisition and relocation of utilities, and it was located below the water table, making it too expensive to be feasible.

Referendum 1, which sought approval of the Bay Freeway, was rejected by a margin of 52,748 to 42,502 on February 8, 1972, effectively canceling the project. In the aftermath of the vote, opponents of the project urged the city council to look into alternate solutions for the "Mercer Street mess".

The Seattle City Council officially terminated the Bay Freeway project by passing an ordinance on May 1, 1972, to halt condemnation proceedings related to properties in the freeway's proposed corridor.

=== Aftermath and subsequent proposals ===
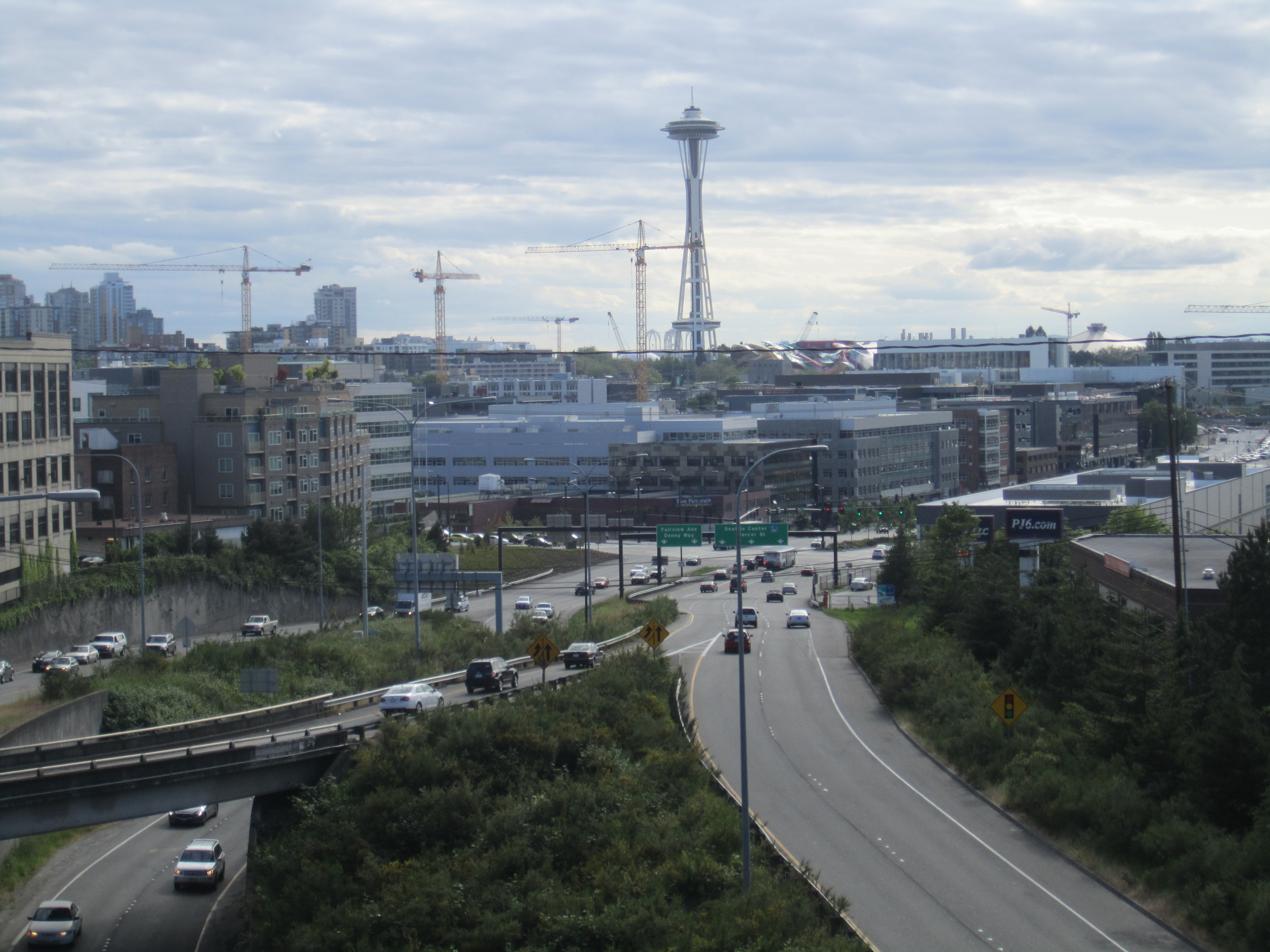
Westbound Mercer Street, viewed from near the I-5 interchange, after its reconfiguration for two-way traffic in 2012

As a result of the vote in February 1972, the State Highway Department transferred $5.7 million (equivalent to $32.3 million in 2024 dollars) in trust funds meant for the Bay Freeway to expanding U.S. Route 195 between Spokane and Pullman in Eastern Washington. State Highway Director George H. Andrews warned that the dual cancelation of the Bay Freeway and R.H. Thomson Expressway, the latter having been defeated on the same day, would overload I-5 far beyond its design capacity, particularly in serving freight traffic near the Industrial District. Seattle Mayor Wes Uhlman predicted that congestion on Mercer Street would continue to worsen, stating that "there is no real alternative to the Bay Freeway", criticizing the rejection as a part of a "nationwide reaction to freeways and concrete".

Mercer Street had previously been split into a couplet, with westbound traffic diverted to Valley Street one block north, as a temporary solution to Seattle Center congestion in 1968. Between then and 1990, the city of Seattle has had 58 studies proposing various methods of reducing congestion on Mercer Street, all of them rejected by the Seattle City Council. Among the most notable proposals include a four-block, $100 million tunnel (equivalent to $220 million in 2024 dollars) that was supported by Mayor Charles Royer in the late 1980s, and the "Broad Street Throughway" plan to lower Broad and Mercer streets and add a park lid at the south end of Lake Union. The failed Seattle Commons levy, which proposed building a 61-acre (0.25 km^{2}) urban park in the South Lake Union neighborhood in 1995, included plans for a below-grade freeway along Mercer Street estimated to cost $93.8 million (equivalent to $176 million in 2024 dollars).

The Seattle Department of Transportation secured $190.5 million in early 2010 to fund its "Mercer Corridor Project", which proposed improving traffic flow by restoring westbound lanes on Mercer Street. A groundbreaking ceremony was held the following September, with construction on the project starting shortly thereafter, hoping to reduce congestion on Mercer Street. After two years of construction, the expanded six-lane Mercer Street opened to traffic on August 27, 2012, allowing for two-way traffic between Dexter Avenue North and I-5 to be carried by Mercer Street for the first time in 44 years. The two-way segment was extended west to 9th Avenue North on May 30, 2014, removing the final section of one-way traffic on Mercer Street, while also permanently closing Broad Street in preparation for the Alaskan Way Viaduct replacement tunnel project.

== Exit list ==
This list reflects the final incarnation of the Bay Freeway, as proposed before the 1972 referendum. The entire highway was in Seattle, King County.

| mi | km | Destinations | Notes |
|---|---|---|---|
| 0.0 | 0.0 | Roy Street, Mercer Street | Eastbound entrance and westbound exit; continues as Broad Street |
| 0.0 | 0.0 | SR 99 (Aurora Avenue North) | Westbound exit only |
| 0.7 | 1.1 | I-5 | |
1.000 mi = 1.609 km; 1.000 km = 0.621 mi: Incomplete access
