= Fred Hutchinson Cancer Center =

Cancer research institute in Seattle, US

- Named after: Fred Hutchinson
- Predecessor: Fred Hutchinson Cancer Research Center Seattle Cancer Care Alliance
- Formation: 1975; 51 years ago
- Type: Nonprofit organization
- Headquarters: Seattle, Washington, U.S.
- Leader: Thomas Lynch Jr., M.D.
- Budget: $654.62 million (2020)
- Website: fredhutch.org

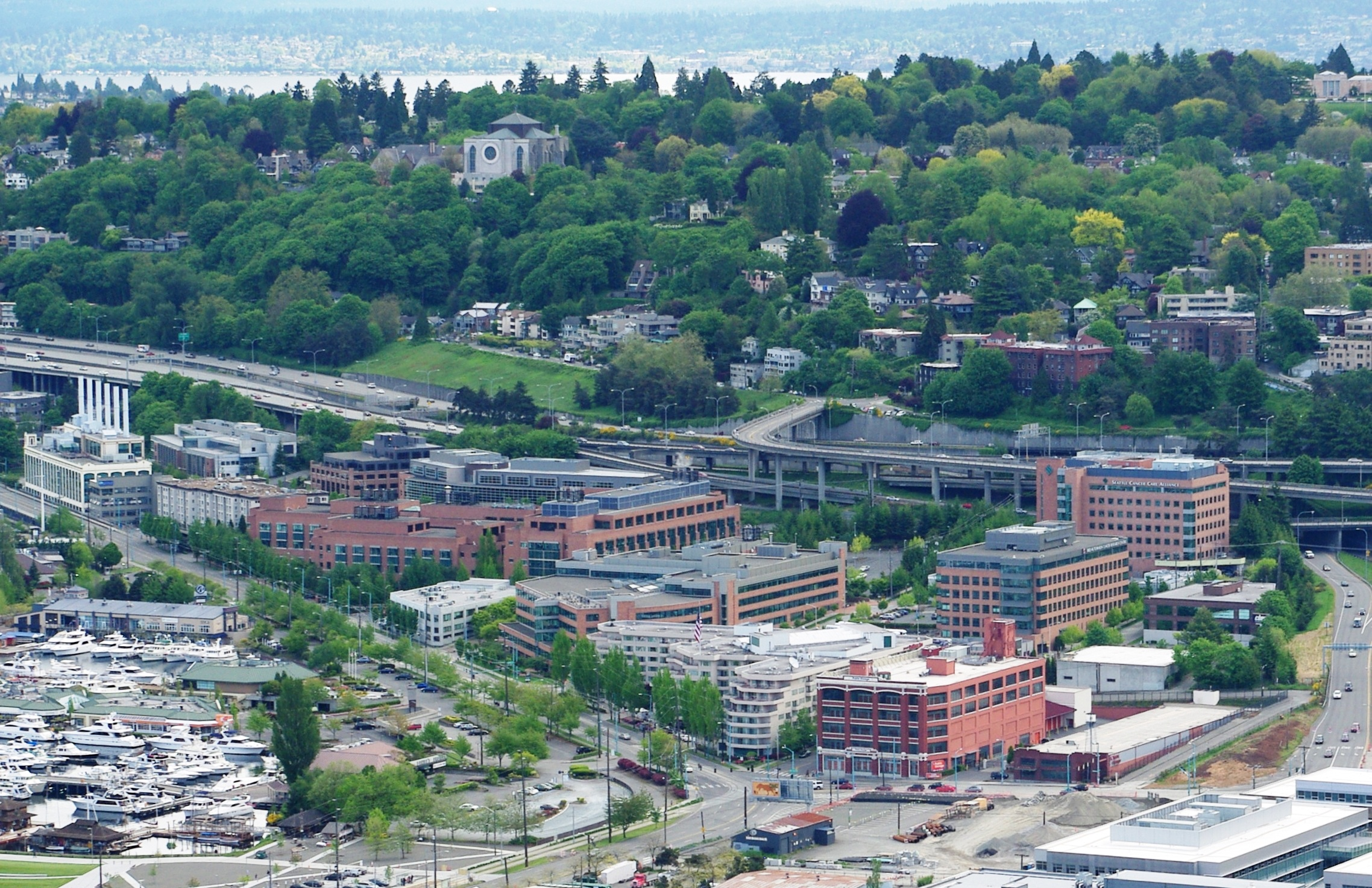
The center's South Lake Union campus as seen from the Space Needle

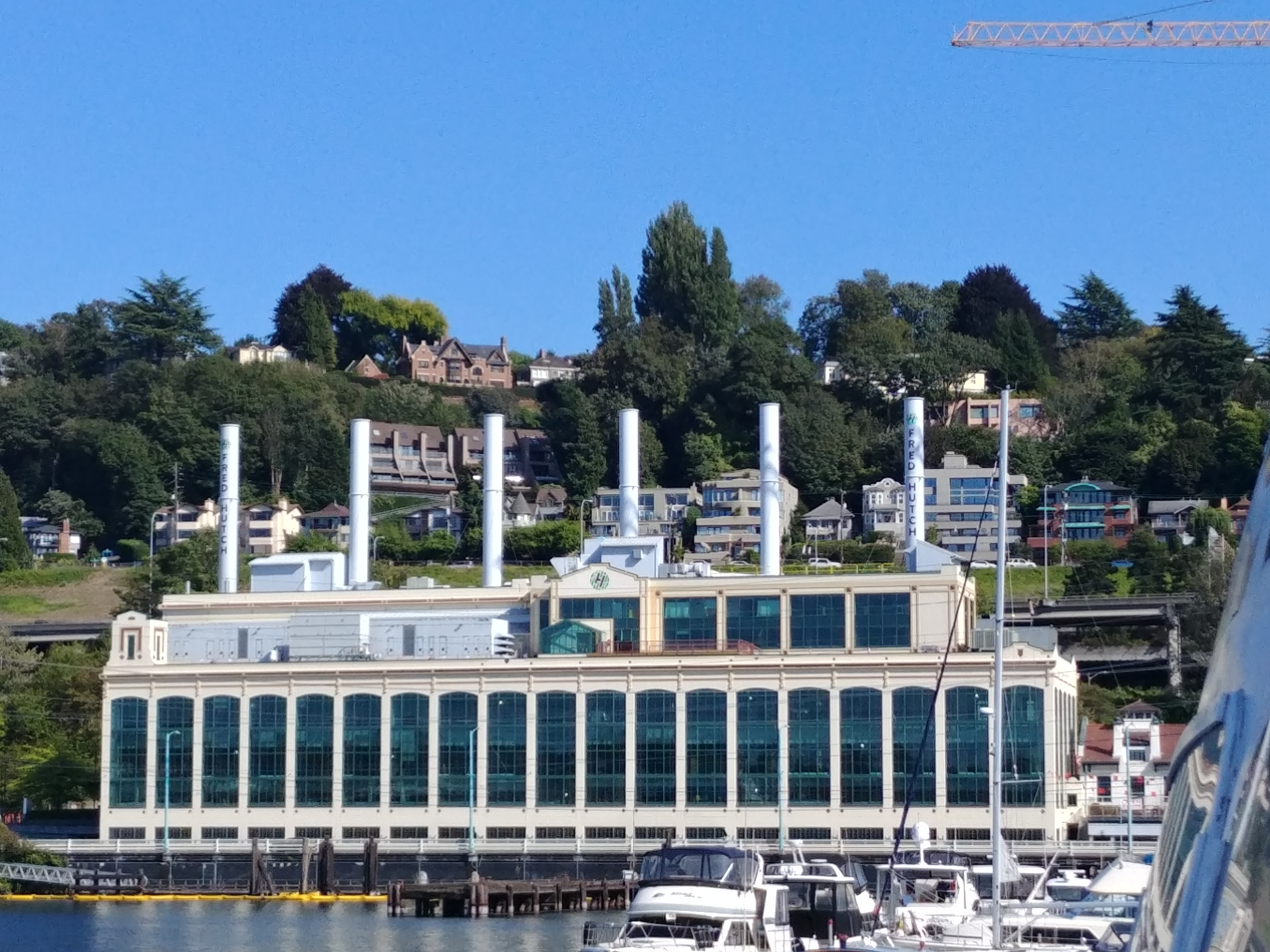
The center's steam plant building

The Fred Hutchinson Cancer Center, formerly known as the Fred Hutchinson Cancer Research Center and also known as Fred Hutch or The Hutch, is a cancer research institute established in 1975 in Seattle, Washington.

== History ==
The center grew out of the Pacific Northwest Research Foundation, founded in 1956 by William B. Hutchinson (1909–1997). The Foundation was dedicated to the study of heart surgery, cancer, and diseases of the endocrine system. Hutchinson's younger brother Fred (1919–1964) was a major league pitcher and manager who died of lung cancer at age 45. The next year, William Hutchinson established the Fred Hutchinson Cancer Research Center as a division of the Pacific Northwest Research Foundation.

In 1972, with the help of Senator Warren G. Magnuson, PNRF received federal funding under the National Cancer Act of 1971 to create in Seattle one of the 15 new NCI-designated Cancer Centers aimed at conducting basic research called for under 1971 Act; the Fred Hutchinson Cancer Research Center became independent 1972 and its building opened three years later in 1975. The center was named an NCI-designated Comprehensive Cancer Center in 1976.

In 1998, the center formed the Seattle Cancer Care Alliance (SCCA), a separate nonprofit corporation, with University of Washington School of Medicine (UW Medicine), and Seattle Children's. This solidified the center's reach into clinical care and was essential for it retaining its NCI comprehensive center designation; the designation was extended to the center's consortium including the SCCA in 2003. SCCA's outpatient clinic first opened in January 2001.

In 2001, The Seattle Times published a series of articles alleging that investigators at the center (including the center's co-founder E. Donnall Thomas) were conducting unethical clinical studies on cancer patients. The paper alleged that in two cancer studies conducted in the 1980s and early 1990s, patients were not informed about all the risks of the study, nor about the study doctors' financial interest in study outcome. The paper also alleged that this financial interest may have contributed to the doctors' failure to halt the studies despite evidence that patients were dying sooner and more frequently than expected. In response, the center formed a panel of independent experts to review its existing research practices, leading to adoption of new conflict-of-interest rules.

In 2010 Lawrence Corey was appointed as the fourth President, following the retirement of Lee Hartwell. He was followed by Gary Gilliland in 2015 as president, who led the institute until 2020. Under his leadership the center announced that it would expand into the former Lake Union steam plant, which previously housed ZymoGenetics. The move was completed in October 2020. In February 2020, Thomas J. Lynch Jr. took over as director.

The year 2014 saw the organization adopt its longtime local nickname, "Fred Hutch", as its official name as part of a rebranding.

On April 1, 2022, Fred Hutchinson Cancer Research Center and Seattle Cancer Care Alliance (SCCA) merged to form Fred Hutchinson Cancer Center, a unified adult cancer research and care center that is clinically integrated with University of Washington (UW) Medicine and UW Medicine's cancer program.

== Notable faculty ==
The center has employed three recipients of the Nobel Prize in Physiology or Medicine:

- Linda B. Buck, who received the award in 2004 for solving many details of the olfactory system; and
- Leland H. Hartwell, who received the honor in 2001 for his discoveries regarding the mechanisms that control cell division. After retiring from leading the center in 2010, Hartwell left to join Arizona State University. and
- E. Donnall Thomas, who received the award in 1990 for his pioneering work in bone-marrow transplantation and who died in 2012;

Another notable employee is H. Joachim Deeg, who pioneered the use of bone marrow transplantation from healthy donors as an effective curative treatment for myelodysplastic syndromes (MDS), aplastic anemia, and a range of blood cancers known as myeloproliferative neoplasms.

== Commercialization ==
The center is active in technology transfer. In 2013, it was one of the top ten biomedical research institutions in the field (excluding universities); it made 18 new deals with companies to develop inventions made at the center, and earned $10,684,882 in income from past deals it had signed. Most notably, Juno Therapeutics, a company developing CAR-T immunotherapy for cancer and that raised $314 million in venture capital investments and had a $265 million initial public offering in 2014, was started based on inventions made at the center. As of 2015, about twenty companies had been started based on center inventions since 1975, including Immunex and Icos.

== Campus ==
The institute's main campus consists of 13 buildings that are on fifteen acres (6.1 ha) in the South Lake Union neighborhood of Seattle.

In 1987, the center began exploring possible new homes to replace its 9-building campus on First Hill that it was set to outgrow. A site in the South Lake Union neighborhood, envisioned by the city as a future high-tech and biotechnology hub, was chosen in September 1988 after a deal to move to Fremont fell through earlier that year. The first phase of the campus, designed by firm Zimmer Gunsul Frasca Partnership, began construction in 1991 and opened on June 1, 1993, in a ceremony that included the burying of a time capsule set to open in 2093.

The campus is accessible via the Mercer Street exit of Interstate 5 as well as several public transportation routes, including the South Lake Union Streetcar.

== See also ==
- Hutch Award
- Uganda Program on Cancer and Infectious Diseases
