= ISK (disambiguation) =

ISK may mean:

== Finance ==
- Icelandic króna (ISO 4217 currency code ISK)
- Interstellar Kredit, a fictional currency from the MMO online videogame Eve Online
- Investeringssparkonto, in Sweden, a type of individual savings account

== Places ==
- Gandhinagar Airport (former IATA airport code ISK), Nashik, Maharashtra, India; a former airport
- Nashik Airport (IATA airport code ISK), Nashik, Maharashtra, India

== Groups, companies, organizations ==
- Islamic State of Iraq and the Levant – Khorasan Province, sometimes referred to as Islamic State Khorasan (ISK or IS-K)
- Intelligence Services Knox, a British WW2 decryption office operated by Dilly Knox
- Internationaler Sozialistischer Kampfbund (German: International Socialist Militant League), former German socialist party during the Weimar Republic and WW2
- InterSky (ICAO airline code ISK), a German airline

=== Schools ===
- International School of Kabul, Afghanistan
- International School of Kenya, Nairobi
- International School of Koje, South Korea
- International School of Kraków, Poland

== Other uses ==
- Ishkashimi language (ISO 639 language code isk), an Iranian language
- Izvan Svake Kontrole (TV show), a Bosnian TV show on Kanal 1 (Bosnia and Herzegovina)

== See also ==
- lSK (disambiguation)
