= Nizza =

Nizza may refer to:

== Places ==
- Nice, a city of the Côte d’Azur, known in Italian, German, and in certain other languages as Nizza
- Nizza di Sicilia, in the Province of Messina, Sicily, Italy
- Nizza Monferrato, in the Province of Asti, Piedmont, Italy
- Ponte Nizza, in the Province of Pavia, Lombardy, Italy
- Val di Nizza, in the Province of Pavia, Lombardy, Italy
- County of Nice, a historical region of France
- Nizza, Frankfurt, a park in Frankfurt am Main, Germany
- Nizza (Turin Metro), a station of the Turin Metro, Italy

== Other uses ==
- Nizza DOCG, an Italian red Piemonte wine
- Rio Nizza, a stream which flows through Nizza Monferrato

== See also ==
- Nisa (disambiguation)
- Nise (disambiguation)
- Niza (disambiguation)
- Nysa (disambiguation)
- Nyssa (disambiguation)
