= Niza =

Niza may refer to:

- Spanish for the city of Nice, France
- Niza, Croatia, a village near Koška
- Niiza, Saitama, Japan
- Marcos de Niza, a 16th-century Franciscan friar

== See also ==
- Nesa (disambiguation)
- Neza
- Nisa (disambiguation)
- Nise
- Nizza (disambiguation)
- Nysa (disambiguation)
- Nyssa (disambiguation)
