= Nisa =

Nisa may refer to:

== Locations ==
- Nısa, a village in Azerbaijan
- Nisa (Boeotia), a city of ancient Boeotia, Greece
- Nisa (Lycia), an ancient town now in Turkey
- Nisa (Megaris), a city of ancient Megaris, Greece
- Nisa, Iran, a village in Hormozgan Province, Iran
- Nisa, Portugal, a municipality in the district of Portalegre
- Nisa, Turkmenistan, an ancient city, first capital of the Parthians
- Nisa River (disambiguation), several rivers

== Organizations ==
- National Intelligence and Security Agency, of the Federal Republic of Somalia
- National Intelligence Security Authority, a defunct agency of the Republic of the Philippines
- Nippon Ichi Software, a Japanese video game developer
- NISA Investment Advisors, an American asset management firm
- Nisa (retailer), a British symbol group of small grocery stores
- Nisa Aşgabat, a Turkmen football club
- Nuclear and Industrial Safety Agency, a defunct agency of the Government of Japan

== Sports ==
- National Ice Skating Association, a British sports governing body
- National Independent Soccer Association, an American soccer (association football) league
- North Imphal Sporting Association, a Manipuri football club in India

== Other meanings ==
- An-Nisa, the 4th sura of the Qur'an
- Nisa, a synonym of the plant genus Homalium
- Nisa, a character in the Hyperdimension Neptunia video game series
- New individual savings account (New ISA), a British tax-advantaged savings and investment product type
- Nippon individual savings account, a Japanese tax-advantaged savings and investment product type
- A fictional National Intelligence and Security Agency in the Canadian comedy series InSecurity
- Nicola Salerno, also known as Nisa (1910–1969), Italian lyricist

== See also ==
- NISA (disambiguation)
- Nesa (disambiguation)
- Nise (disambiguation)
- Niza (disambiguation)
- Nysa (disambiguation)
- Nyssa (disambiguation)
