= NISA =

NISA may refer to:

- National Independent Soccer Association, a third tier United States soccer league
- National Intelligence and Security Agency of Somalia
- Nuclear and Industrial Safety Agency, part of the Japanese Ministry of Economy, Trade and Industry
- NIS America, the US subsidiary of Nippon Ichi Software
- National Ice Skating Association, former name of British Ice Skating, the governing body of ice skating sports within the UK
- The New ISA, a revised form of the Individual Savings Account introduced in the UK's 2014 budget
- North Imphal Sporting Association, a football club in India
- National Industrial Security Academy, an academy in India
- NISA Investment Advisors, an American asset management firm
- Nippon individual savings account, a tax-advantaged investment account in Japan

== See also ==
- Nisa (disambiguation)
