= Stráž =

Stráž may refer to places in the Czech Republic:

- Stráž (Domažlice District), a municipality and village in the Plzeň Region
- Stráž (Tachov District), a market town in the Plzeň Region
- Stráž nad Nežárkou, a town in the South Bohemian Region Region
- Stráž nad Nisou, a municipality and village in the Liberec Region
- Stráž nad Ohří, a municipality and village in the Karlovy Vary Region
- Stráž pod Ralskem, a town in the Liberec Region
- Stráž, a village and part of Křimov in the Ústí nad Labem Region
- Stráž, a village and part of Mirotice in the South Bohemian Region
- Stráž, a village and part of Sušice in the Plzeň Region
- Stráž u České Lípy, a village and part of Stružnice in the Liberec Region
- Hojsova Stráž, a village and part of Železná Ruda in the Plzeň Region
