= Nesian =

Nesian may refer to:

- someone or something related to the ancient city-state of Nesa, in Anatolia (modern Turkey)
- someone or something related to the Nesians (an endonymic term for ancient Hittites)
- Nesian language, a variant (endonymic) term for the ancient Hittite language
- Nesian Mystik, a musical group from New Zealand

== See also ==
- Nesa (disambiguation)
- Nessa (disambiguation)
