= Nesa =

Nesa may refer to:

== Places ==
- Nesa (Kültepe), an ancient city in Anatolia
- Nesa, Alborz, a village in Alborz Province, Iran
- Nesa-e Olya, a village in Alborz Province, Iran
- Nesa-ye Sofla, a village in Alborz Province, Iran
- Nesa, Gilan, a village in Gilan Province, Iran
- Nesa, Hormozgan, a village in Hormozgan Province, Iran
- Nesa-ye Olya, a village in Kohgiluyeh and Boyer-Ahmad Province, Iran
- Nesa, Qazvin, a village in Qazvin Province, Iran
- Nesa Rural District, in Alborz Province, Iran
- Nisa, Turkmenistan, also transliterated as Nesa

== Other ==
- Nesa (butterfly), a genus of gossamer-winged butterflies
- National Eagle Scout Association
- National Electronic Sectional Appendix, United Kingdom
- National Electronic Security Authority, the country's intelligence agency, United Arab Emirates
- National Emergency Supply Agency, Finland
- Near East South Asia Center for Strategic Studies, National Defense University in Washington, DC
- New England Sociological Association
- NSW Education Standards Authority, Australia
- NeSA Eisenbahn-Betriebsgesellschaft Neckar-Schwarzwald-Alb-mbH, the operating company for the Zollernbahn Railway Society (EFZ)

== See also ==
- Nisa (disambiguation)
- Nysa (disambiguation)
- Nyssa (disambiguation)
