= Neisse (disambiguation) =

The Lusatian Neisse is a river in Central Europe.

Neisse or Neiße (German) may also refer to:

== Places ==
- Neisse (town), a former German town in Upper Silesia, now named Nysa, Poland
  - Duchy of Neisse
  - Landkreis Neisse, a rural district in the Province of Upper Silesia
- Spree-Neiße, a district in Brandenburg, Germany

== Rivers ==
- Lusatian Neisse, a left tributary of the Oder on the Polish-German border
- Eastern Neisse, a left tributary of the Oder in Silesia
- Raging Neisse, a left tributary of the Kaczawa (Katzbach) in Poland
  - Little Neisse, left tributary of the Raging Neisse

== People ==
- Eberhard of Neisse, bishop of Warmia (1301–1326)
- Eric Neisse (born 1964), French athlete
- Hermann Neiße (1889–1932), German footballer

== Other uses ==
- Neisse University, a network of academic institutions in Czech Republic, Germany, and Poland
- Battle of the Oder-Neisse, in early 1945
- Oder-Neisse line, after 1945

== See also ==
- Nisa (disambiguation)
- Nysa (disambiguation)
- Nyssa (disambiguation)
