= Kanal 1 =

Kanal 1 can refer to:

- SVT1 or Kanal1, a Swedish television channel
- Kanal 1 (Bosnia and Herzegovina) or K1 Sarajevo, a Bosnian-language cable music television channel
- Kanal 1 (Turkey), a Turkish-language public television station and channel of an international version of Wheel of Fortune
- BNT 1, a Bulgarian television channel from the Bulgarian National Television, formerly named Kanal 1 (channel 1)
