= DICO =

Dico may refer to:

- Dico, a village the Lerik Rayon of Azerbaijan
- Dico's, a fast food chain in China
- Diritti e doveri delle persone stabilmente conviventi (DiCo), a proposed Italian bill for cohabiting couples

People

- Brandon DiCamillo (b. 1976), an American comedian/actor
- Dico Jap Tjong (b. 1998), a Dutch footballer
- Dico Koppers (b. 1992), a Dutch professional footballer
- Dico Woolley (b. 1982), a Brazilian professional football coach and former footvolley player
- Dobbie Dico (1843–1912), a Scots-born South Australian brassfounder, engineer, inventor, lecturer, mesmerist, businessman and travel writer
- Florin Dico, an engineer of Dico și Țigănaș
- Edson Dico Minga (b. 1979), retired Congolese professional footballer
- Mihai Dico (b. 1987), a Romanian rugby union player
- Pelé (b. 1940), nickname for Brazilian footballer
- Tina Dico (b. 1977), a Danish singer-songwriter
