= Bedřichov (Jablonec nad Nisou District) =

- Municipality
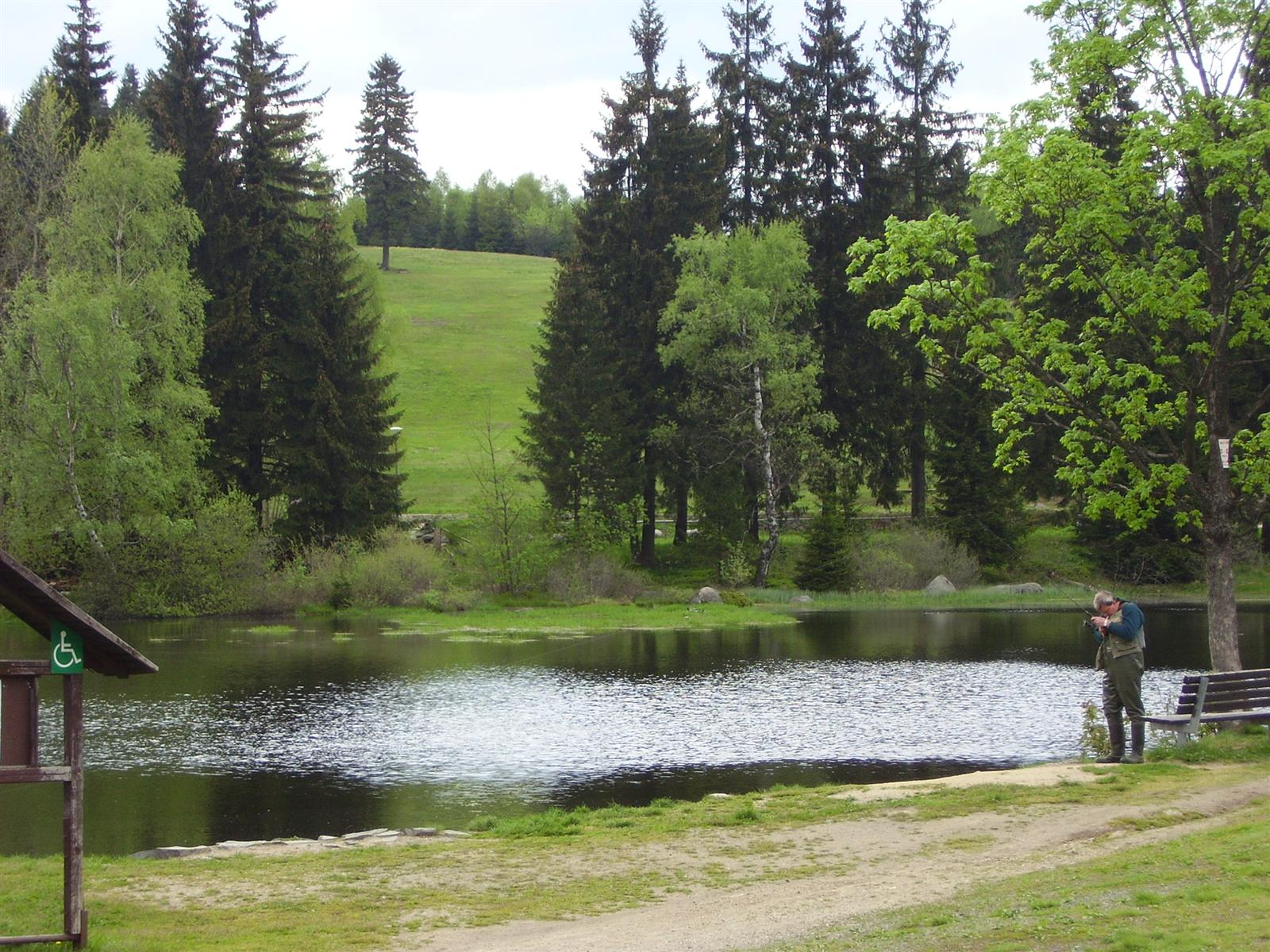
- Fishpond at Bedřichov

- Flag Coat of arms

- Location in the Czech Republic
- Coordinates: 50°47′28″N 15°8′33″E
- Country: Czech Republic
- Region: Liberec
- District: Jablonec nad Nisou
- First mentioned: 1602

Area
  - Total: 24.26 km^{2} (9.37 sq mi)
- Elevation: 707 m (2,320 ft)

Population (2026-01-01)
  - Total: 389
  - Density: 16.0/km^{2} (41.5/sq mi)
- Time zone: UTC+1 (CET)
  - Summer (DST): UTC+2 (CEST)
- Postal code: 468 12
- Website: www.bedrichov-ou.cz

Bedřîchov (German: Friedrichswald) is a municipality and village in Jablonec nad Nisou District in the Liberec Region of the Czech Republic. It has about 400 inhabitants.

== Etymology ==
Bedřîchov, originally named in German Friedrichswald, was probably named after the father of Count Melchior of Redern (Friedrich/Bedřich), on whose estate the village was founded. The German name literally means "Friedrich's forest".

== Geography ==
Bedřichov is located about 6 kilometres (4 mi) north of Jablonec nad Nisou and 5 km (3 mi) east of Liberec. It lies in the Jizera Mountains and in the eponymous protected landscape area. The highest point is the mountain Černá hora at 1,085 m (3,560 ft) above sea level. The Kamenice River originates in the eastern part of the municipal territory. The Černá Nisa River flows along the western municipal border. Bedřichov Reservoir is built on the Černá Nisa within the municipality. The Nová louka Nature Reserve is located north of the village.

== History ==
At the end of the 16th century, the area od today's Bedřichov was completely forested. It belonged to the Liberec estate, owned by Count Melchior of Redern. In 1598, Peter Wander asked the count for permission to establish a glass factory in these places. A settlement soon arose around the glass factory. The first written mention of Bedřîchov is from 1602.

== Demographics ==
Historical population

Year	Pop.	±%
1869	1,209	—
1880	1,206	−0.2%
1890	1,268	+5.1%
1900	1,255	−1.0%
1910	1,394	+11.1%

Year	Pop.	±%
1921	1,196	−14.2%
1930	1,248	+4.3%
1950	540	−56.7%
1961	255	−52.8%
1970	177	−30.6%

Year	Pop.	±%
1980	165	−6.8%
1991	163	−1.2%
2001	239	+46.6%
2011	300	+25.5%
2021	335	+11.7%

Source: Censuses

== Transport ==
There are no railways or major roads passing through the municipality.

== Sport ==
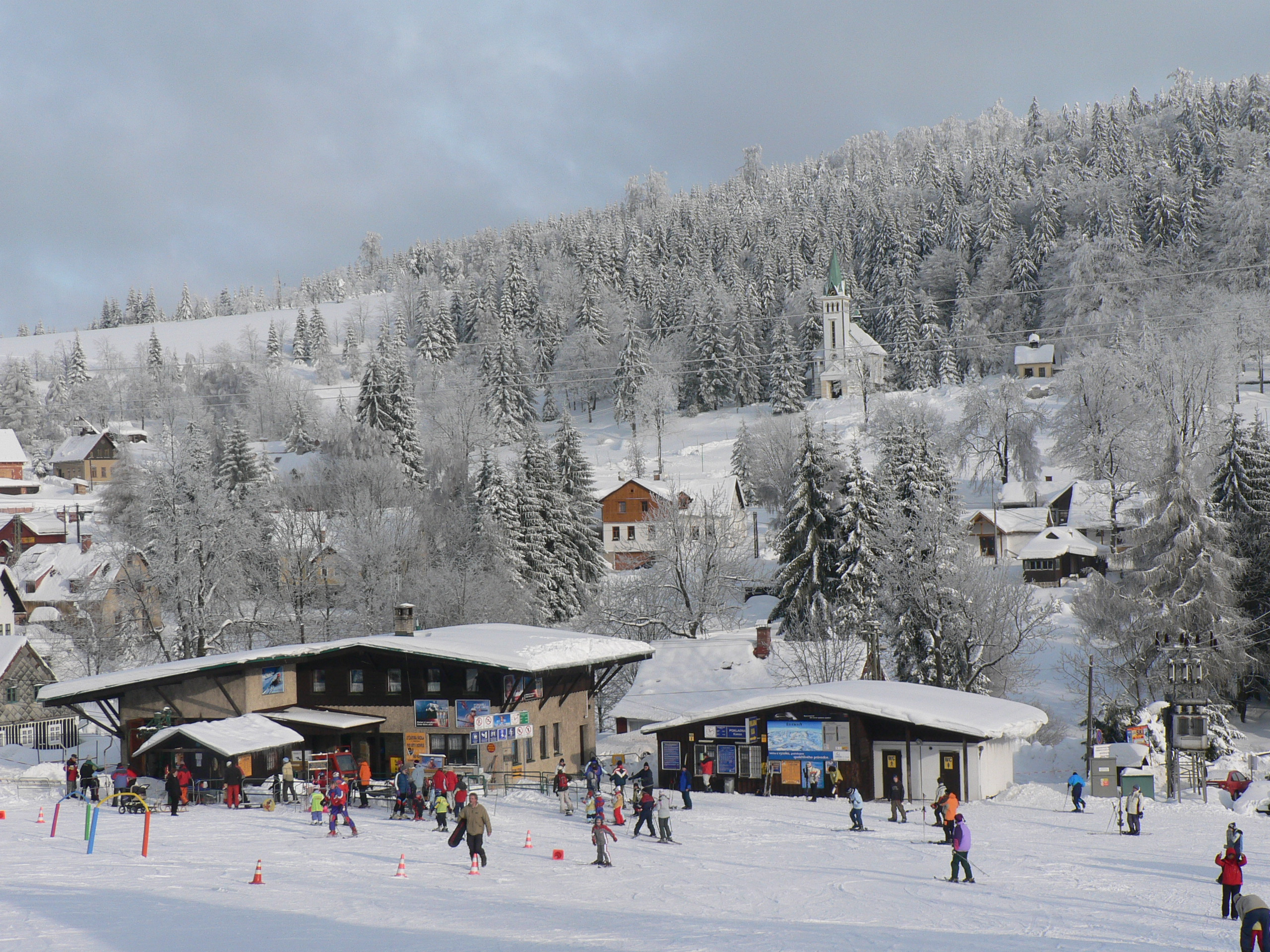
Bedřichov ski resort

There is a ski resort at Bedřichov, which was used during the 2009 Nordic World Ski Championships in Liberec. It is popular for cross-country skiing and downhill skiing.

== Sights ==
The main landmark of Bedřichov is the Church of Saint Anthony of Padua. It was built in the neo-Gothic style in 1930–1932.

Šámalova chata is a mountain hut, protected as a cultural monument. It was originally a house from the second half of the 18th century, which was rebuilt into a hunting castle by Count Clam-Gallas after 1817.
