= Nessa (disambiguation) =

Nessa is Nessa Diab, American radio and TV personality and partner of football quarterback Colin Kaepernick.

Nessa may also refer to:

== People ==
- Nessa (given name)
- Nessa (surname)
- Aoife Nessa Frances (born 1992), Irish singer, songwriter, and musician
- Fazilatun Nessa Indira (born 1956), Bangladesh politician
- Kari Nessa Nordtun (born 1986), Norwegian lawyer and politician

== Places ==
- Nessa (Kültepe), a variant spelling of the ancient city of Nesha, in Anatolia
- Nessa, Haute-Corse, France, a commune on the island of Corsica
- Nessa, Saxony-Anhalt, Germany, a town

== Fiction and mythology ==
- Nessa (Middle-earth), a Vala in J. R. R. Tolkien's Eä universe
- Nessa (Pokémon), in the Pokémon franchise
- Nessa Jenkins, a character on the BBC television series Gavin & Stacey
- Nessa Warner, a character on the British television soap opera Coronation Street
- Nessarose, a character in the musical Wicked, sometimes known by as Nessa
- Conchobar mac Nessa, the king of Ulster in the Ulster cycle of Irish mythology
- Ness (Irish mythology), a legendary Irish princess

== Other uses ==
- Nessa Records, a jazz record label
- Nessa (insect), a genus of crickets in the tribe Podoscirtini

== See also ==
- Nesa (disambiguation)
