= Straz =

Straz may refer to:

- Stráž (disambiguation), multiple places in the Czech Republic
- Straż, Podlaskie Voivodeship, a village in Poland
- "Straz" (Soupy Norman), a 2007 television episode
