= Nysa =

Nysa may refer to:

== Greek mythology ==
- Nysa (mythology), the mountainous region or mount (various traditional locations), where nymphs raised the young god Dionysus
- Nysiads, nymphs of Mount Nysa who cared for and taught the infant Dionysus

== People ==
- Nysa (wife of Pharnaces I of Pontus), 2nd century BC Greek Seleucid princess, Queen of Pontus by marriage
- Nysa of Cappadocia (fl. 150s–126 BC), wife of Ariarathes V, King of Cappadocia
- Nysa, one of the daughters of Mithridates V Euergetes, King of Pontus (died c. 120 BC)
- Nysa, one of the daughters of Mithridates VI Eupator, King of Pontus (135–63 BC)
- Nysa (wife of Nicomedes III of Bithynia) (fl. second half of 2nd century BC), wife of Nicomedes III, King of Bithynia
- Nysa (daughter of Nicomedes III of Bithynia) (fl. 2nd-1st century BC), daughter of Nicomedes III of Bithynia and Nysa

== Settlements and jurisdictions ==
=== Turkey ===
- Nysa on the Maeander, (Caria) an ancient city and bishopric in Asia Minor (Anatolia), ruins in the Sultanhisar district of Aydın Province, restored as Latin Titular bishopric of Nysa in Asia in 1933
- Nysa (Cappadocia), an ancient city in Cappadocia
- Nisa (Lycia), an ancient city in Lycia

=== Greece ===
- Nysa (Boeotia), a town of ancient Boeotia
- Nysa (Euboea), a town of ancient Euboea
- Nysa (Naxos), a town of ancient Naxos
- Nysa (Thrace), a town of ancient Thrace and later Macedonia

=== Elsewhere ===
- Nysa (Alexander), a town spared by Alexander the Great during his invasion of Central Asia
- Nysa, Poland, a town in southern Poland on the Nysa Kłodzka river
- Nisa, Turkmenistan

== Rivers ==
- Nysa Łużycka, Polish name for the Lusatian Neisse, a river in the Czech Republic, Poland and Germany, flowing to Oder River near the towns of Guben and Gubin
- Nysa Kłodzka, a river in Poland, named for the town of Kłodzko, in English called the Eastern Neisse; a tributary of the Oder (Odra)
- Nysa Szalona, a river in Poland, the Raging Neisse; a tributary of the Kaczawa in Poland
- Nysa Mała, a river in Poland, the Little Neisse; a tributary of the Nysa Szalona

== Other uses ==
- 44 Nysa, an asteroid
- NKS Nysa, a men's volleyball team playing in Polish Volleyball League
- ZSD Nysa, an Automobile produced in Nysa, Poland from the 1950s to the early 1990s
- Neisse University, a university in the border triangle of Czech Republic, Poland and Germany

== See also ==
- Nysa-Scythopolis, the Hellenistic Bet She'an in northern Israel
- Neisse (disambiguation)
- Nyssa (disambiguation)
- Nisa (disambiguation)
