= Nová louka =

Mountain meadow in the Czech Republic

- IUCN category IV (habitat/species management area)
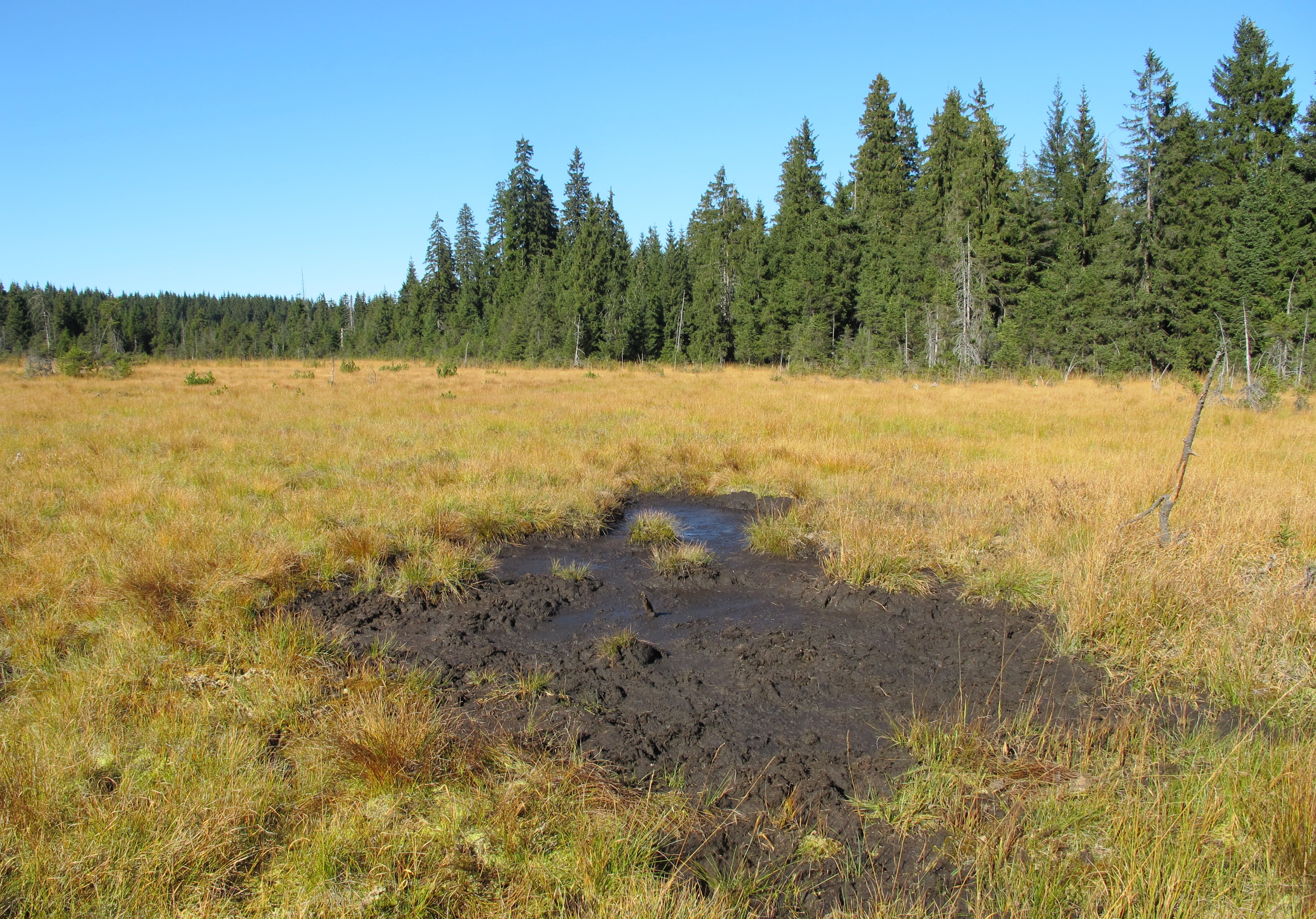

- Location within Czech Republic
- Location: Bedřichov, Liberec Region, Czech Republic
- Coordinates: 50°48′52″N 15°9′44″E
- Area: 32.35 ha (79.9 acres)
- Max. elevation: 785 m (2,575 ft)
- Min. elevation: 765 m (2,510 ft)
- Established: 21 June 1960
- Operator: AOPK ČR

Nová louka is a mountain meadow in the municipality of Bedřichov in the Liberec Region of the Czech Republic, protected as a nature reserve. It is located in the Jizera Mountains.

== Name ==
In 1597, the locality was called Medvědí louka (literally 'Bear Meadow'). Today it is named after a nearby hunting lodge located outside the protected area, which was originally called Nová Louka (i.e. 'new meadow'), later Panský dům, and today is called Šámalova chata. The meadow is sometimes referred to as Šámalova louka.

== Nature ==
The reason for the protection are the natural communities of peat and waterlogged spruce, with enclaves of natural forestless peats and with a large number of rare and endangered organisms. The Blatný Brook flows through the reserve.
