= Šámalova chata =

Mountain hut in the Czech Republic

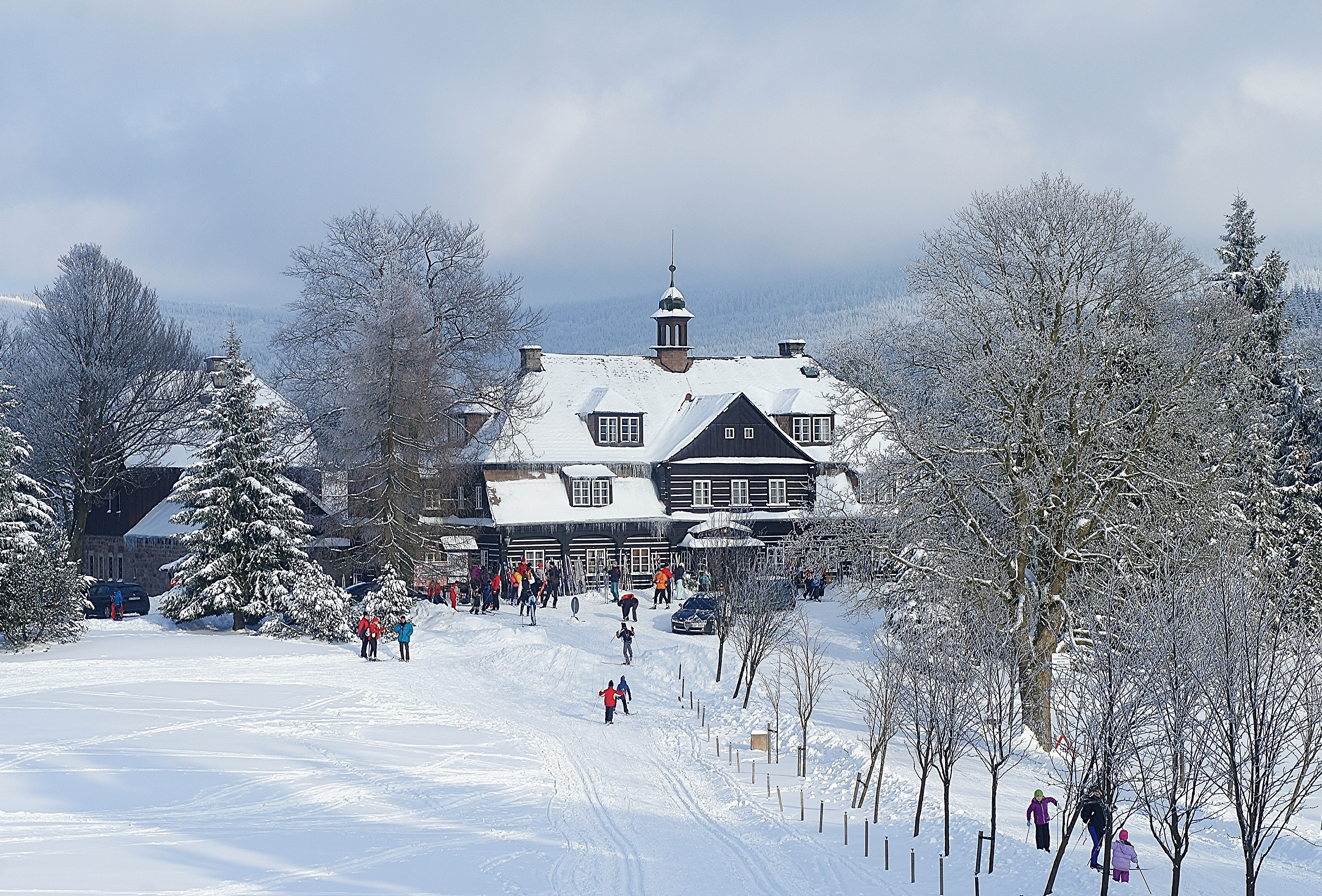
- Šámalova chata
- Interactive map of the Šámalova chata area

General information
- Location: Bedřichov 48, Bedřichov, 468 12, Czech Republic
- Coordinates: 50°48′50.29″N 15°9′28.41″E
- Owner: Lesy České republiky
- Management: Petr Polák

Website
- www.samalova-chata.cz

Šámalova chata is a mountain hut for bikers, skiers and tourists, situated at Nová Louka, a mountain meadow in Jizera Mountains (in Czech Jizerské hory) near the city of Bedřichov, district of Jablonec nad Nisou. It is situated in the north of the Czech Republic, approximately 130 km (81 mi) from Prague, close to the borders with Germany and Poland.

The hut was well known for its simple but great cuisine, especially game. The hut is also used as a hotel and it is a popular place for wedding banquets.

== History ==
The origin of the hut goes back to 1756 when Mr. Riedel built it as a residential timbered house, together with a glass works, which was operational until 1817. Twenty years later, the works was demolished.

In 1844, the residential house was sold to the Clam-Gallas family, local nobility, which reconstructed the house in a timbered hunting hut. Today, the hut is called Šámalova chata.

In 1929, the hut became the property of the Czechoslovak state and it was used as a seat of the local forest office of Bedřichov. It was also used as a recreational hut of the Czechoslovak government during the World War I and World War II. In connection with the visit of Eduard Beneš, a Czechoslovak president between 1935 and 1938 and 1945 and 1948, a water turbine was installed in the Blatný pound (in Czech Blatný rybník), approximately 800 m (2,600 ft) away from the hut, and the hut was electrified.

After 1989, the area has been used in film production, for example the 1994 television series Prima sezóna and the 2016 drama film Tenkrát v ráji.

== Legacy ==
The hut was also frequently used by the Czech politician Přemysl Šámal. Šámal was the head of the Office of the President of Czechoslovakia during the First Czechoslovak Republic; at the beginning of the World War II, he became a leading member of Anti-Nazi movement called Politické ústředí and he was tortured to death in the Nazi prison at Moabit, Berlin on 9 March 1941. In his memory, a plague was erected on the side of the meadow. In addition, the hut has started to be called as Šámal hut (in Czech Šámalova chata). During the period between the World War I and World War II, the hut was renovated and most of the rooms were lined with larch wood. Its largest room was refurbished in a similar fashion as a room and bath of Jan Masaryk, the Czech foreign minister at the time, in Černín Palace in Prague.
