= Təndul =

- Location within Azerbaijan
- Coordinates: 38°42′N 48°34′E
- Country: Azerbaijan
- Rayon: Lerik
- Municipality: Dico
- Time zone: UTC+4 (AZT)
  - Summer (DST): UTC+5 (AZT)

Təndul (also, Təndül) is a village in the Lerik Rayon of Azerbaijan. The village forms part of the municipality of Dico.
