= Nisse =

Nisse may refer to:

- Nisse, Netherlands, a town in the municipality of Borsele
- Nisse (folklore), a mythical creature in Scandinavian mythology also known as Tomte
- Niels, a Scandinavian given name, as a nickname
- Nils, a Scandinavian given name, as a nickname

== See also ==
- Nissedal Municipality, a municipality in Telemark county, Norway
- Nissa (disambiguation)
