= Nisa River =

Nisa River may refer to:

- Kladská Nisa, the Czech name for Nysa Kłodzka (Eastern Neisse) a river in Poland
- Lužická Nisa, the Czech name for Lusation Neisse, a river arising in the Czech Republic, and then flowing in Germany and Poland
  - Bílá Nisa, (White Nisa) a right tributary of the Lužická Nisa, entirely in the Czech Republic
  - Černá Nisa, (Black Nisa) a right tributary of the Lužická Nisa, entirely in the Czech Republic
- Nisa River, Portugal, a river whose source is in the Serra de São Mamede
