= Nissa =

Nissa may refer to:

- Caltanissetta, a commune in Sicily, known as Nissa in Sicilian
- SSD Nissa FC, a football club in Caltanissetta, Sicily
- Niš, a city in Serbia, formerly also known as Nissa

== See also ==
- Nyssa (disambiguation)
