= Nessa (surname) =

Nessa is the surname of the following notable people:

- Ludvig Nessa (born 1949), Norwegian priest
- Majeda Rafiqun Nessa, Bangladeshi diplomat
- Sabina Nessa (c. 1993–2021), British murder victim
