= Nıso =

- Municipality
- Location within Azerbaijan
- Coordinates: 38.69442°N 48.57234°E
- Country: Azerbaijan
- Rayon: Lerik
- Time zone: UTC+4 (AZT)
  - Summer (DST): UTC+5 (AZT)

Nısa is a village in the municipality of Dico in the Lerik Rayon of Azerbaijan.
