= Černá Nisa =

River in Liberec District in the Czech Republic

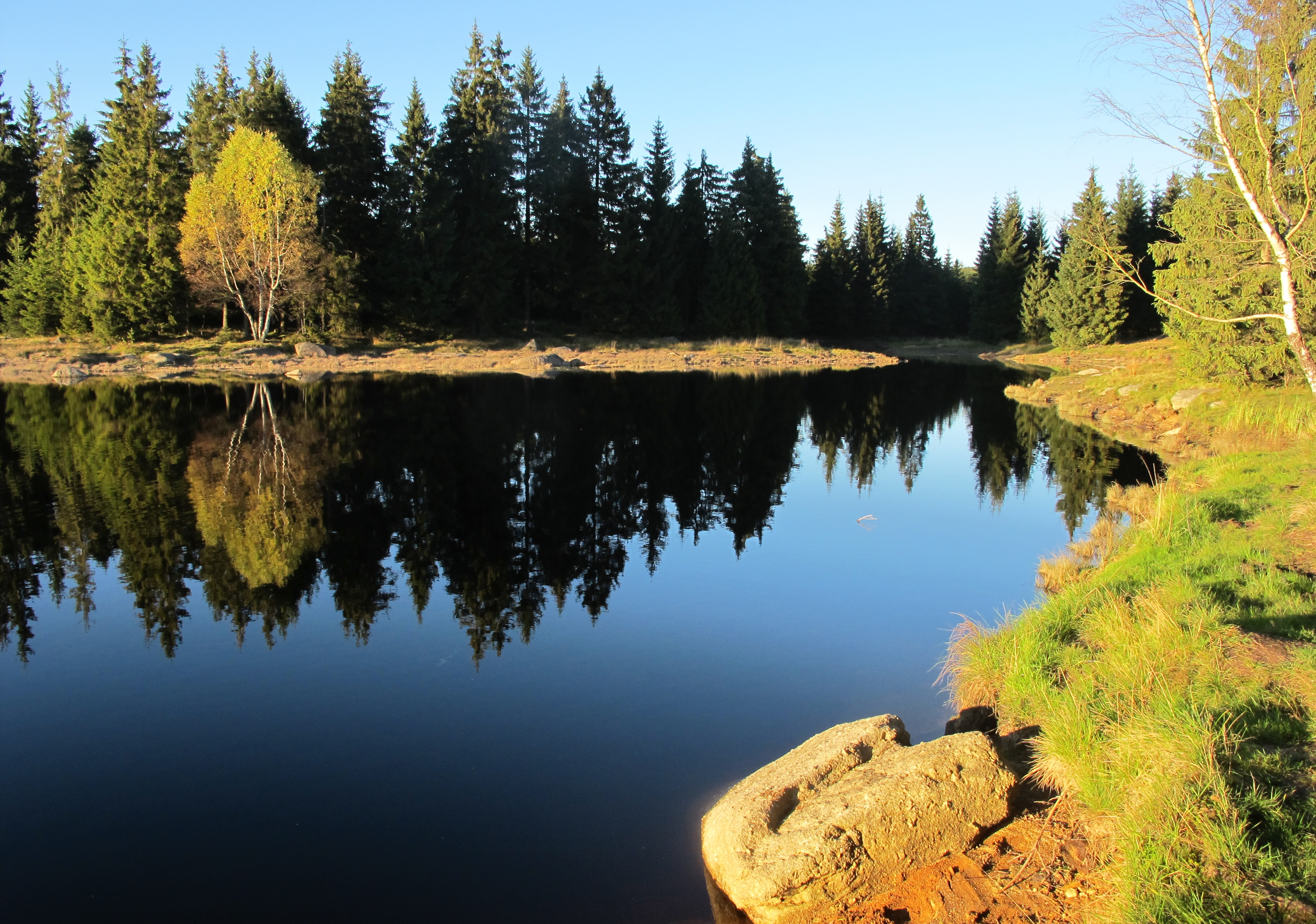

Location
- Country: Czech Republic

Physical characteristics
- Source: Olivet Mountain, Jizera Mountains
  - coordinates: 50°50′25″N 15°9′5″E
  - elevation: 820 m
- Mouth: Lusatian Neisse, Stráž nad Nisou
  - coordinates: 50°47′11″N 15°1′27″E
  - elevation: 330 m (1,080 ft)
- Length: 14.2 km (8.8 mi)
- Basin size: 27 km²

Černá Nisa is a river in Liberec District in the Czech Republic. It is 14.2 km long. Its drainage basin has an area of 27 km².

== Geography ==
It originates east of Olivet Mount in the Jizera Mountains and has a predominantly torrential nature with a considerable drop and a rocky river bed. It flows into Lusatian Neisse from the right in Stráž nad Nisou.

== Usage ==
The Bedřichov Water Reservoir stands on its upper course. Another small water reservoir is in Rudolfov below the hydroelectric power plant fed by an underground channel from the Bedřichov Dam. It is used for boating from Rudolfov to Kateřinky. It is a trout river used in the past by many industrial enterprises in Kateřinky.
