= Stráž (Domažlice District) =

- Municipality
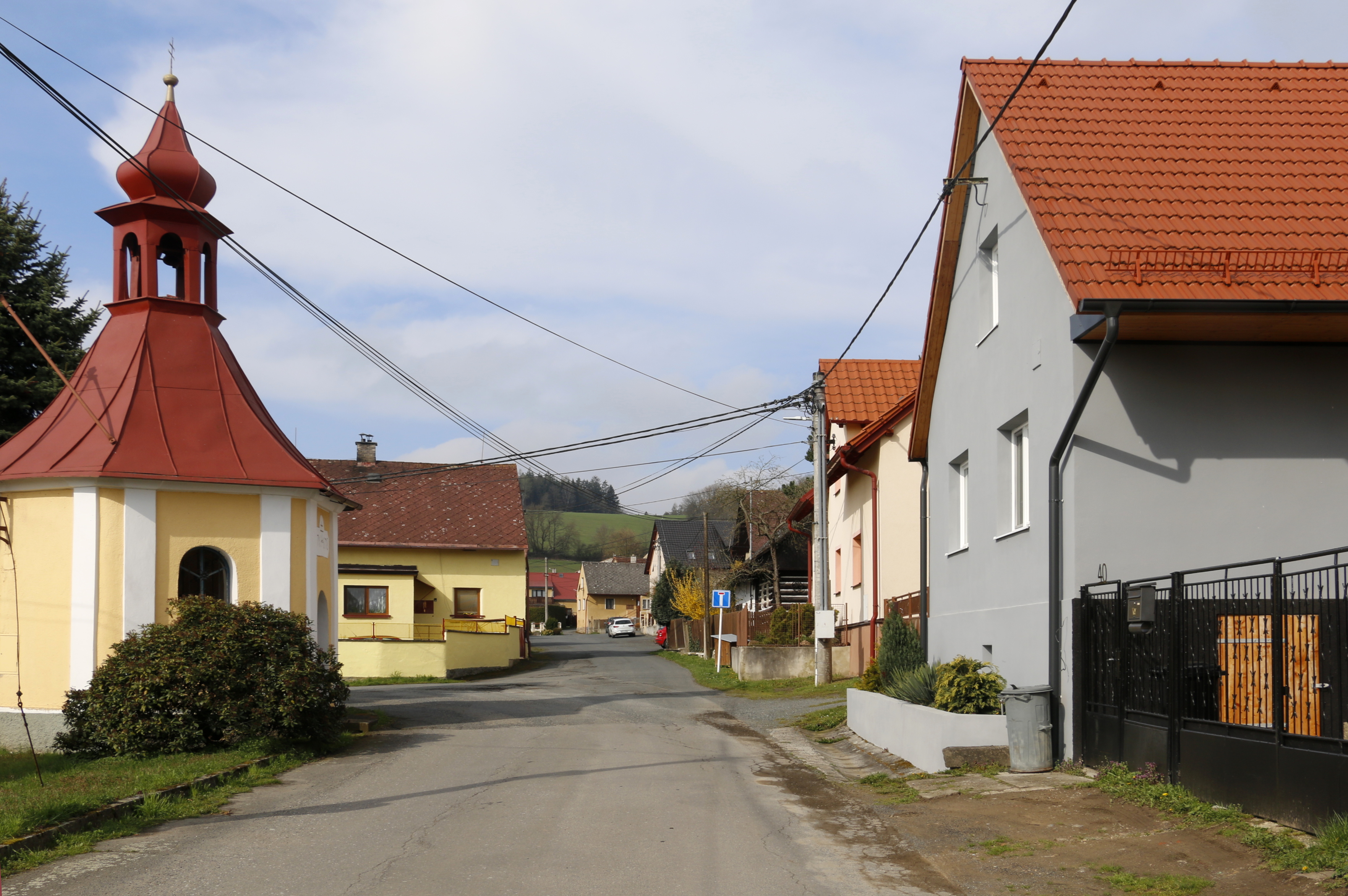
- Centre of Stráž

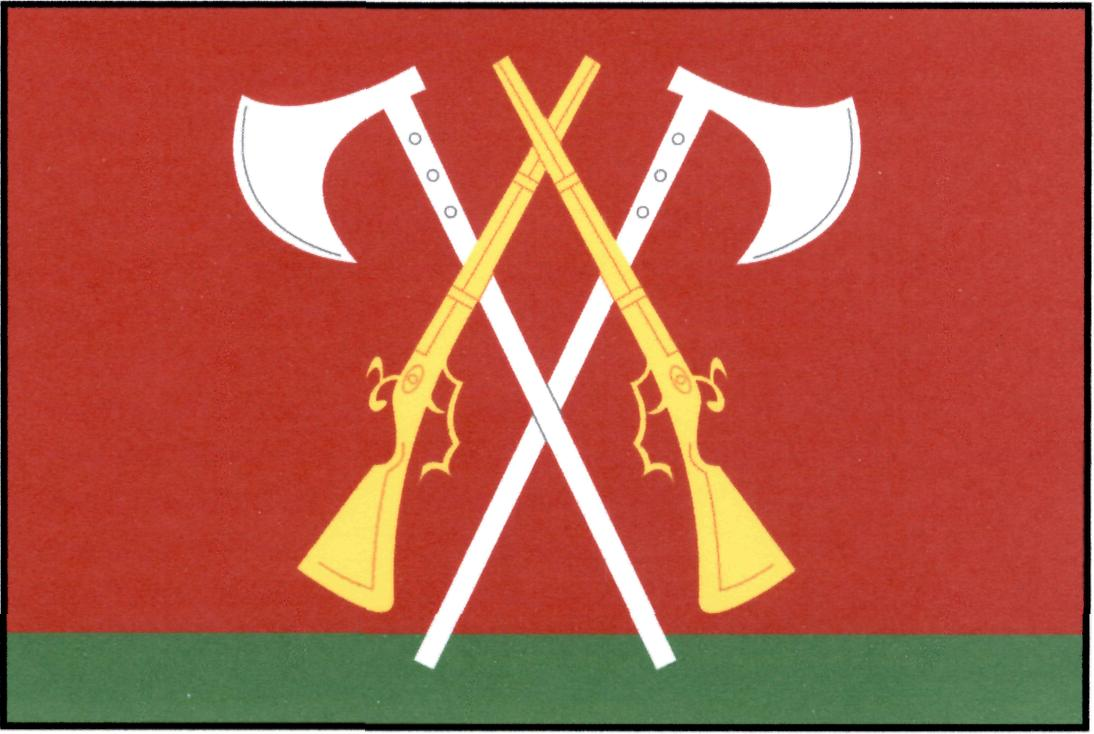
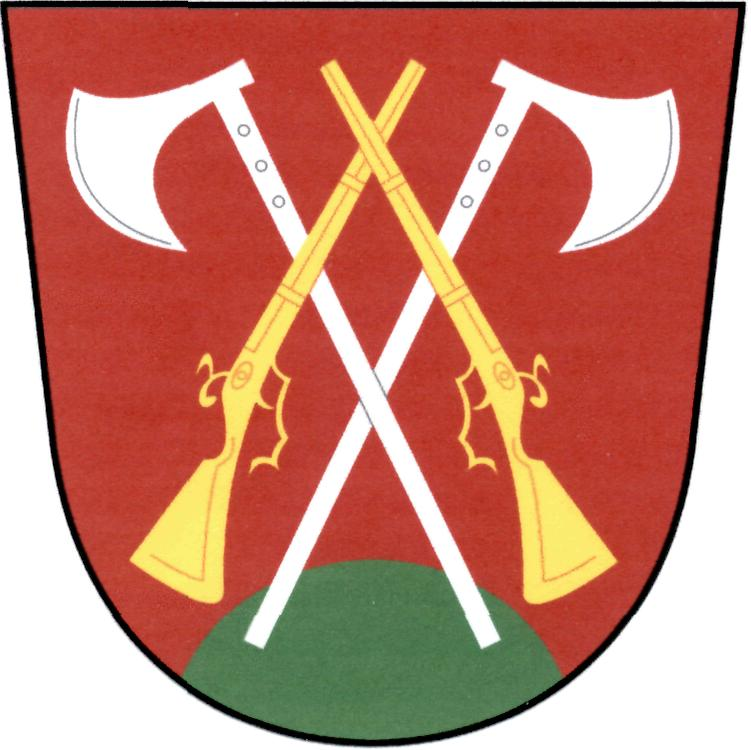
- Flag Coat of arms

- Location in the Czech Republic
- Coordinates: 49°24′53″N 12°54′47″E
- Country: Czech Republic
- Region: Plzeň
- District: Domažlice
- First mentioned: 1579

Area
  - Total: 2.66 km^{2} (1.03 sq mi)
- Elevation: 503 m (1,650 ft)

Population (2026-01-01)
  - Total: 220
  - Density: 83/km^{2} (210/sq mi)
- Time zone: UTC+1 (CET)
  - Summer (DST): UTC+2 (CEST)
- Postal code: 344 01
- Website: www.strazchodsko.cz

Stráž is a municipality and village in Domažlice District in the Plzeň Region of the Czech Republic. It has about 200 inhabitants.

Stráž lies approximately 4 kilometres (2 mi) south-west of Domažlice, 51 km (32 mi) south-west of Plzeň, and 133 km (83 mi) south-west of Prague.

== Etymology ==
The name Stráž means 'guard' in Czech. This name was often given to places that were used for guarding and from which it was possible to see well into the distance, or to places along rivers that served to keep watch so that no one passed without paying the toll.

== Demographics ==
Historical population
Year	Pop.	±%
1869	363	—
1880	361	−0.6%
1890	363	+0.6%
1900	370	+1.9%
1910	364	−1.6%
1921	351	−3.6%
1930	337	−4.0%
1950	237	−29.7%
1961	236	−0.4%
1970	211	−10.6%
1980	234	+10.9%
1991	213	−9.0%
2001	235	+10.3%
2011	227	−3.4%
2021	205	−9.7%
Source: Censuses
