= Hojsova Stráž =

Village in the Czech Republic

- village
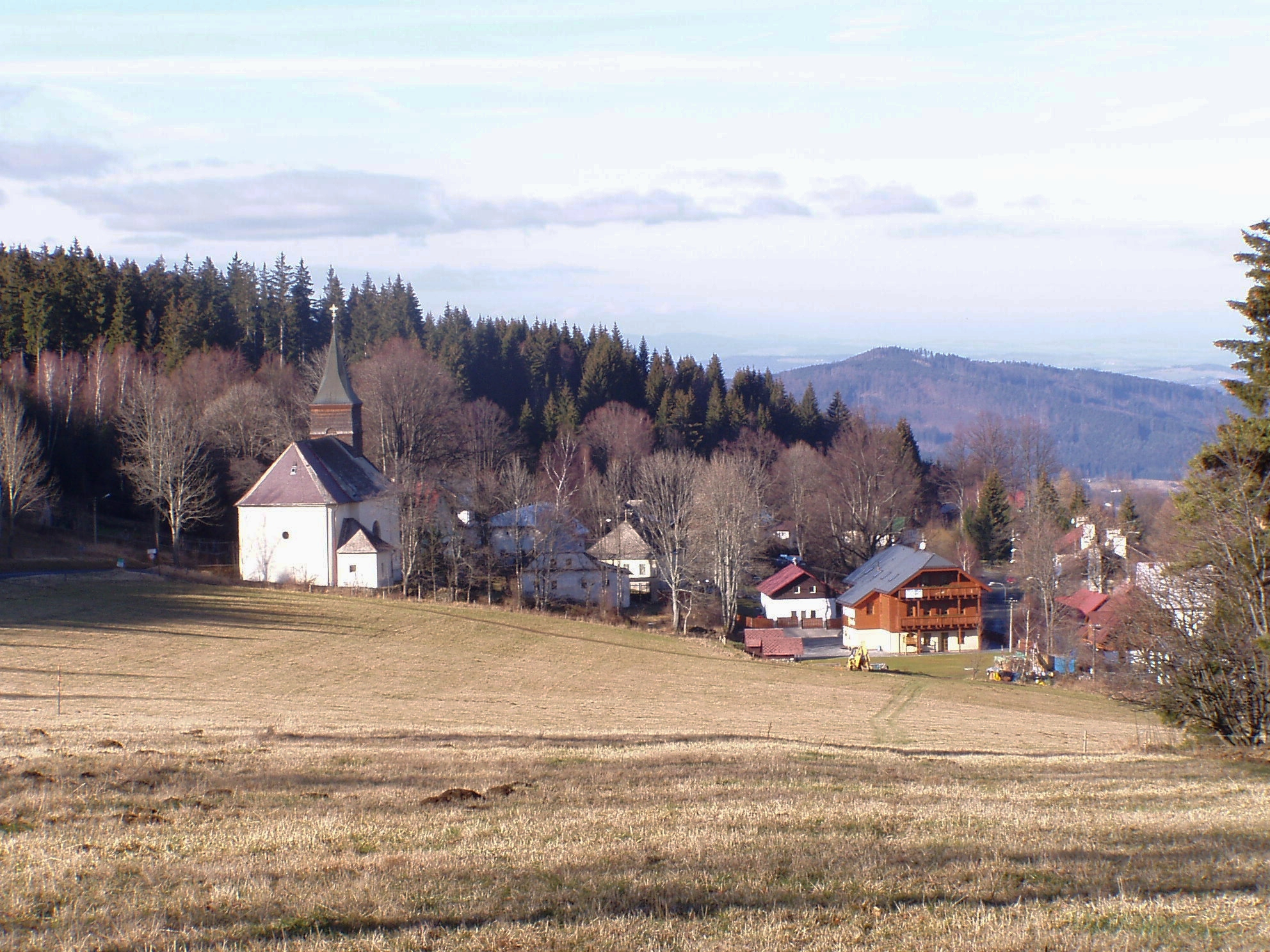
- View from the southeast

- Location within Czech Republic
- Coordinates: 49°12′40″N 13°11′51″E

Area
  - Total: 31.96 km^{2} (12.34 sq mi)
- Elevation: 890 m (2,920 ft)

Population (2011)
  - Total: 131
- Postal code: 34022

Hojsova Stráž (Czech pronunciation: [ˈɦojsova ˈstraːʃ]; German: Eisenstraß) is a village in the Bohemian Forest in the Plzeň Region of the Czech Republic. It is administratively a part of Železná Ruda. It traces its origins to the 16th century as a community of miners. The single-aisled Catholic Church of the Immaculate Conception of the Virgin Mary was built in 1826. Since the late 18th century the region has been known as a tourist destination for its remarkable natural landscapes.

== History ==
The first written mention of Hojsova Stráž was from 1614. The original settlement was founded near iron ore mines.

A brewery was founded here in 1850, but was closed in 1946.

The village only became well known in the 20th century due to the development of tourism in Šumava. Today, Hojsova Stráž is an important center for winter and summer recreational activities.

== Gallery ==
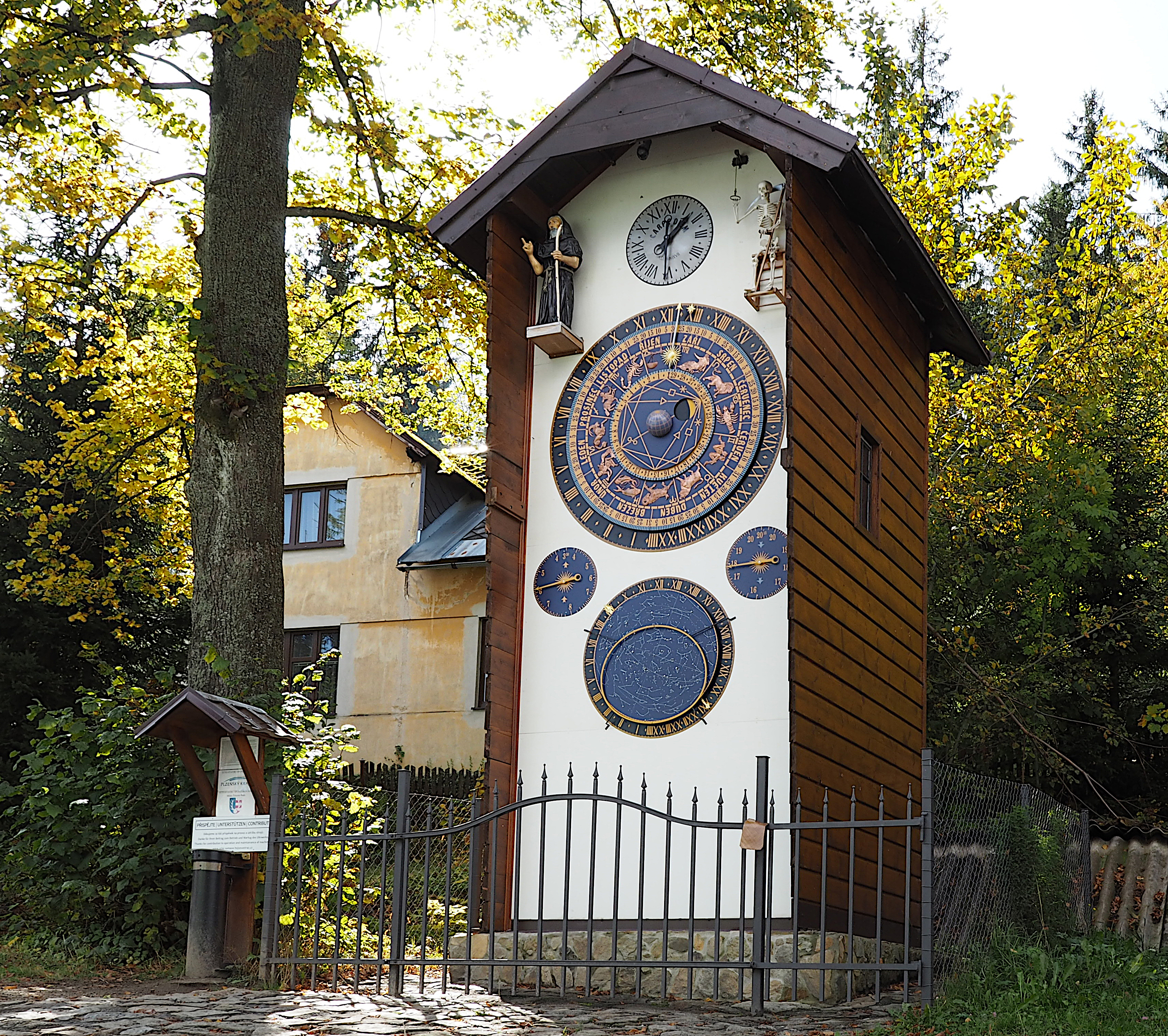

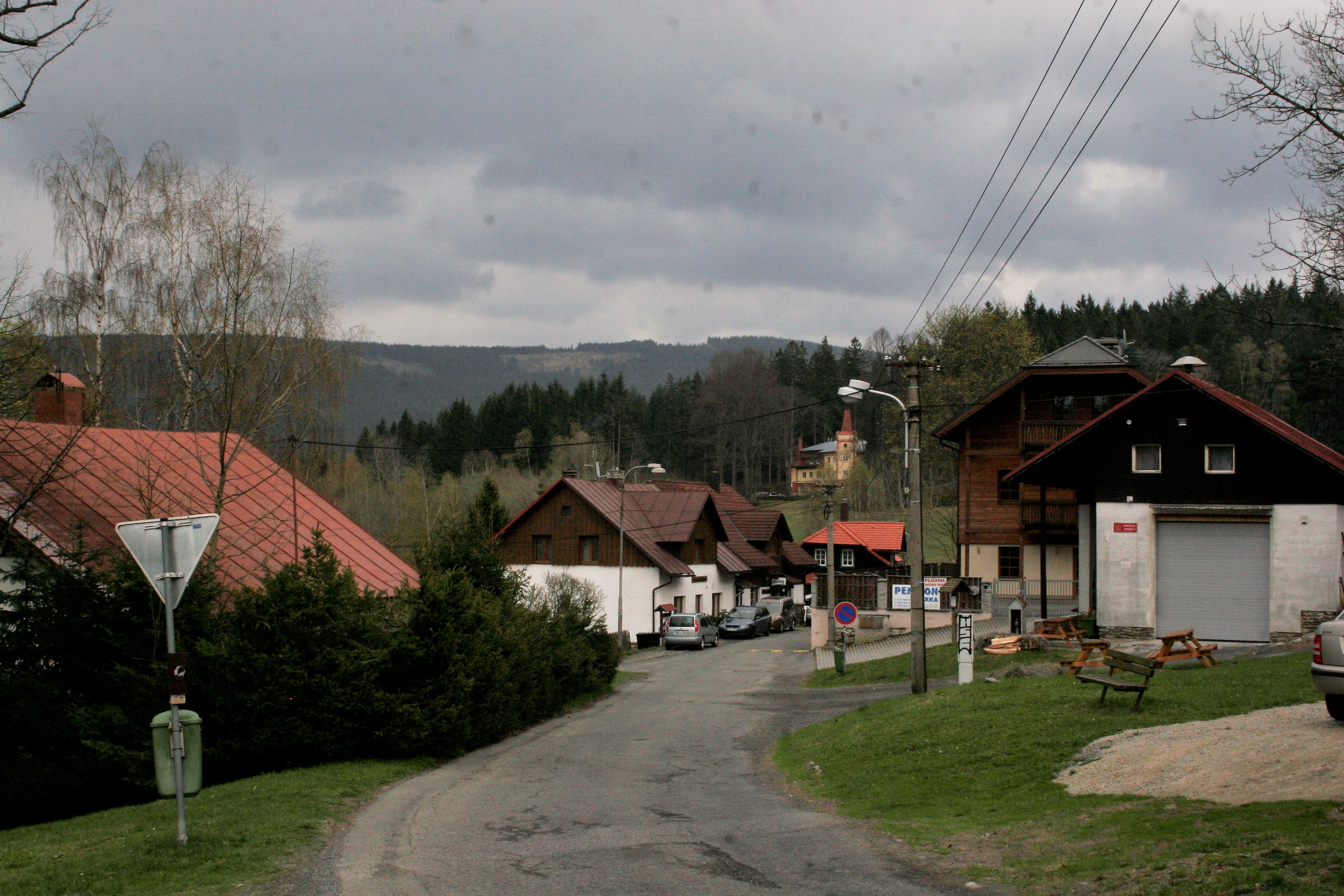

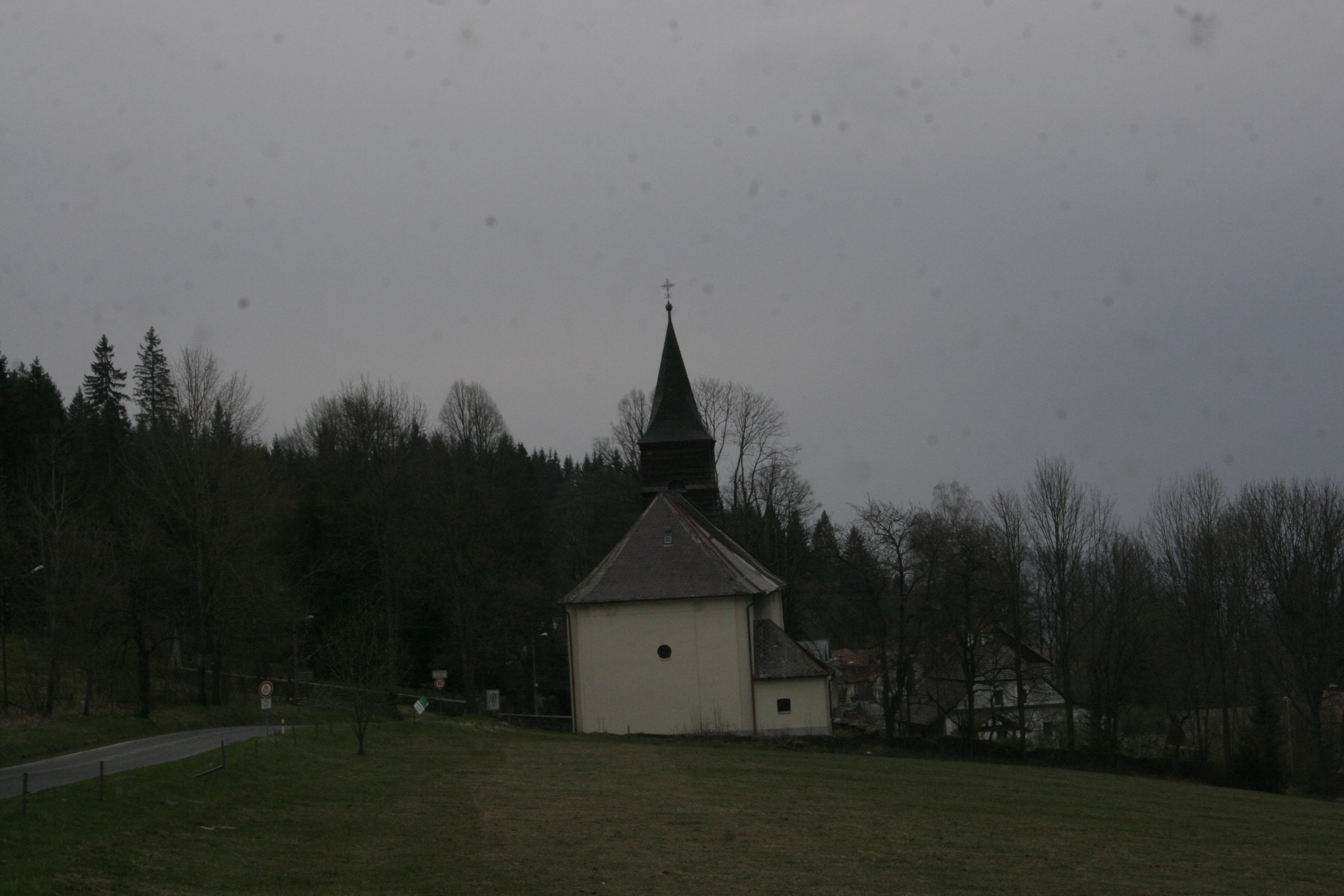

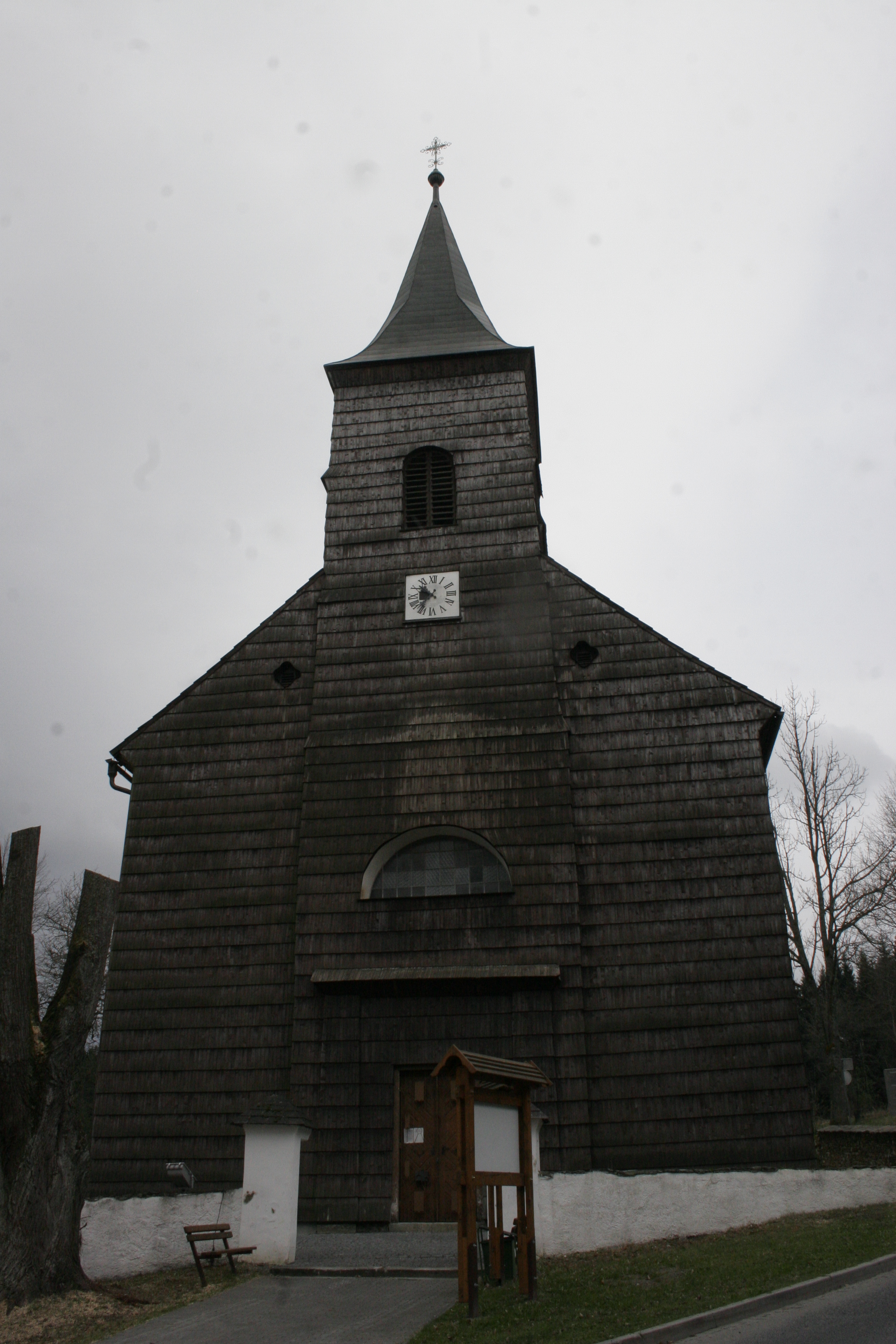
