= Nysa (Naxos) =

Nysa (Ancient Greek: Νῦσα) was a town in ancient Naxos whose location was not otherwise known precisely.
