= Nysa (Euboea) =

Nysa (Ancient Greek: Νῦσα) was a town in ancient Euboea, where the vine was said to put forth leaves and bear fruit in the same day.
