= Investeringssparkonto =

Swedish savings vehicle

An Investeringssparkonto (Investment Savings Account or ISK) is a Swedish savings vehicle for private individuals (and estates, but not legal entities) that was introduced in Sweden on January 1, 2012, following a decision by the Riksdag (Swedish Parliament). It is designed to encourage savings in stocks and investment funds without subjecting individual savers to complex tax reporting requirements. Capital gains and dividends from an ISK do not need to be reported on the individual's income tax return, as they are entirely tax-free. Instead, the account holder must report a flat-rate taxable income on their tax return, which is calculated in roughly the same way as for life insurance products, using the government bond rate from the preceding year as the basis.

A similar product, the Individual savings account was first launched in the United Kingdom on April 6, 1999.

== Taxation ==
To calculate an ISK's flat-rate tax, the cost basis is first determined. It is calculated as one quarter of the total of the value of the assets in the account at the start of each quarter, plus the value of any deposits and transfers made to the account during the year by the account holder or from another person’s ISK.

A tax exempt portion for ISK savings was introduced by the Kristersson cabinet in their 2025 budget. From January 2025, the tax-free limit was 150,000 SEK. From January 2026, savings in an ISK are tax-free up to 300,000 SEK per person.

The flat-rate income is then calculated by multiplying the cost basis by the government bond rate as of November 30 of the previous year, plus 1.0 percentage points. The flat-rate income is then adjusted to be no less than 1.25% of the cost basis. Finally, this flat-rate income is then taxed at 30%.

Prior to the 2016 tax year, the government bond rate was used directly, without any increase or minimum threshold. During the 2016 and 2017 tax years, the increase was 0.75%.

Factor for flat-rate income
Tax year	Government bond rate (Note: The government bond rate on November 30 of the previous year.)	Increase (Note: The increment added to the government bond rate to calculate the flat-rate income)	Base rate	Adjusted rate	Tax-free limit
2012	1.65%	—	—	1.65%	
2013	1.49%	—	—	1.49%	
2014	2.09%	—	—	2.09%	
2015	0.90%	—	—	0.90%	
2016	0.65%	0.75%	1.25%	1.40%	
2017	0.27%	0.75%	1.25%	1.25%	
2018	0.49%	1.0%	1.25%	1.49%	
2019	0.51%	1.0%	1.25%	1.51%	
2020	-0.09%	1.0 %	1.25 %	1.25 %	
2021	-0.10%	1.0 %	1.25 %	1.25 %	
2022	0.23 %	1.0 %	1.25 %	1.25 %	
2023	1.94 %	1.0 %	1.25 %	2.94 %	
2024	2.62 %	1.0 %	1.25 %	3.62 %	
2025	1.96 %	1.0 %	1.25 %	2.96 %	150,000 SEK
2026	2.55 %	1.0 %	1.25 %	3.55 %	300,000 SEK

This savings vehicle differs from kapitalförsäkringen (capital insurance policies) in several respects, but from a tax perspective, the government's aim has been to ensure that both savings vehicles are tax-neutral. These are the main differences:

- Capital income from the investment savings account is reported as income under the capital income category and is taxed together with other capital income, after deductions for expenses such as interest costs, management fees, and so on. Capital insurance is taxed separately through a return tax levied by the insurance company, and it is not affected by the policyholder's other income circumstances.
- The account holder owns the securities held in the ISK, unlike in a capital insurance policy, where the insurance company holds legal title to the securities. This means that ISK holders can exercise their rights and safeguard their interests at a company's general meeting.
- The ISK forms part of the deceased's estate and is subject to standard inheritance rules, whereas capital insurance is paid out upon death according to the policy's beneficiary designation.

== Criticisms ==
The Swedish National Audit Office highlighted in a review that although the savings scheme has indeed made it easier to invest in shares, the reform may have cost 42 billion SEK between 2012 and 2017. A report from the think tank SNS Konjunkturråd concluded that the scheme deviates from other forms of saving in an unjustified way and proposes that the tax be aligned with other capital income taxation and abolished in its current form.

Towards the end of the 2010s, ISK accounts were increasingly used by investors in the growing market for cryptocurrencies. The reasons were partly that several of the major cryptocurrencies (Bitcoin, Ether) became easily available for trading within the ISK system in the form of certificates, and partly that the ISK system was tax-advantageous for short-term cryptocurrency trading (since no tax is levied on each individual transaction).
