= Nippon individual savings account =

Japanese retail investment account

A Nippon individual savings account (NISA) is an account that is meant to help residents in Japan save money with tax-exempt benefits. It is modeled after the Individual Savings Account in the United Kingdom. There are two types of NISA accounts: a general NISA and a tsumitate (savings) NISA. The savings NISA is primarily for mutual funds and long-term investments, whereas the general NISA includes domestic and foreign equities, exchange traded funds (ETF) and real-estate investment trusts (REITs).

== History ==
NISA was created in 2014 as a way to encourage more people to save for retirement with investments. This was mainly spurred by the studies showing that the majority of Japanese residents had little to no savings for retirement and most of that savings being cash rather than investments. NISA was revamped in January 2024 in order to encourage Japanese households to shift their cash household savings into stocks, ETFs and mutual funds.

== Features ==
The account earns tax-free growth up until five years and resets every cycle. Each account is only allowed to invest ¥1,200,000 each year with a total maximum limit of ¥6,000,000 after which anything contributed and any capital gains over the limit is fully taxed. Unlike other retirement tax-deferred accounts, a NISA is only allowed to hold stocks, ETFs, and trusts. Bonds are not permitted in the accounts. This account is meant to be a mid-term investment option for those who don't have iDeCo.

== Tsumitate NISA ==
A new type of NISA account that was introduced in 2018 that has a 20-year tax-exempt with a yearly contribution limit of ¥400,000. Unlike the regular NISA account, this one only allows mutual funds for investments.

== Junior NISA ==
Introduced in 2016, a Junior NISA is modeled after the Junior ISA in the United Kingdom and is meant to help parents and guardians save money for anyone under 20. A Junior NISA has a yearly limit of ¥800,000.

== See also ==
- NISA article on RetireWiki.jp

Non-pension products:

- Individual Savings Account (ISA), the original account in the UK that NISA is modeled after.
- Tax-free savings account (TFSA) (Canada)
- Livret A (France)

Pensions:

- Superannuation in Australia
- Individual retirement account (IRA); the Roth IRA type is similar except for having extra restrictions (United States)
- 401(k); the Roth 401(k) type is similar (United States)
