= Nysa (Thrace) =

Town in ancient Thrace

Nysa (Ancient Greek: Νῦσα) was a town in ancient Thrace, in the district between the rivers Strymon and Nestus, which subsequently formed part of ancient Macedonia. It is called Nyssos by Pliny the Elder.
