= Nesa, Qazvin =

Nesa نسا
- Village
- Location within Iran
- Coordinates: 36°23′34″N 50°40′33″E
- Country: Iran
- Province: Qazvin
- County: Qazvin
- Bakhsh: Rudbar-e Alamut
- Rural District: Alamut-e Pain

Population (2006)
  - Total: 15
- Time zone: UTC+3:30 (IRST)
  - Summer (DST): UTC+4:30 (IRDT)

Nesa (Persian: نسا, also Romanized as Nesā‘) is a village in Alamut-e Pain Rural District, Rudbar-e Alamut District, Qazvin County, Qazvin Province, Iran. At the 2006 census, its population was 15, in 7 families.
