= Dico =

Village in Azerbaijan

Coordinates: 38°43′N 48°35′E

Dico is a village and municipality in the Lerik Rayon of Azerbaijan. It has a population of 280. The municipality consists of the villages of Dico, Nısa, and Təndul.
