= LSK =

LSK, or lsk, may refer to:

- LSK (musician), an English singer, songwriter and record producer, born Leigh Stephen Kenny.
- Law Society of Kenya, an organization for legal professionals
- Lillestrøm SK, a Norwegian football club from the city of Lillestrøm
- Ljungskile SK, a Swedish football club located in Ljungskile, a town within Uddevalla Municipality
- LSK, the ICAO code for Aurela, a charter airline based in Vilnius, Lithuania
- LSK, the National Rail code for Liskeard railway station, Cornwall, UK
