= Nesah-ye Allahdad =

Village in Kohgiluyeh and Boyer-Ahmad, Iran

Nesah-ye Allahdad نسه اله داد
- Village
- Location within Iran
- Coordinates: 30°30′25″N 51°24′59″E
- Country: Iran
- Province: Kohgiluyeh and Boyer-Ahmad
- County: Boyer-Ahmad
- Bakhsh: Central
- Rural District: Sepidar

Population (2006)
  - Total: 144
- Time zone: UTC+3:30 (IRST)
  - Summer (DST): UTC+4:30 (IRDT)

Nesah-ye Allahdad (Persian: نسه اله داد, also Romanized as Nesah-ye Allahdād; also known as Nesā-ye ‘Olyā) is a village in Sepidar Rural District, in the Central District of Boyer-Ahmad County, Kohgiluyeh and Boyer-Ahmad Province, Iran. At the 2006 census, its population was 144, in 32 families.
