= Individual savings account =

Class of retail investment arrangement

An individual savings account (ISA or Isa; /ˈaɪsə/) is a class of retail investment arrangement available to residents of the United Kingdom. Introduced in 1999 as an Individual Special Savings Account (ISSA), the accounts are exempt from income tax and capital gains tax on the investment returns, and no tax is payable on money withdrawn from the scheme.

Cash and a broad range of investments can be held within the arrangement, and there is no restriction on when or how much money can be withdrawn. Since 2017, there have been four types of account: cash ISA, stocks & shares ISA, innovative finance ISA (IFISA) and lifetime ISA (LISA). Each taxpayer has an annual investment limit (£20,000 since 2020–21) which can be split among the four types as desired. Additionally, children under 18 may hold a junior ISA, with a different annual limit.

Until the lifetime ISA was introduced in 2017, ISAs were not a specific retirement investment, but the accounts can be useful tools for retirement planning alongside pensions.

== History ==
=== Origins ===
ISAs were introduced on 6 April 1999, replacing the earlier personal equity plans (PEPs; very similar to a Stocks and Shares ISA) and tax-exempt special savings accounts (TESSAs; very similar to a Cash ISA). Other tax-advantaged savings that predate ISAs include many offered by National Savings and Investments, a state-owned institution which has in the past offered a range of other tax-free accounts, in addition to its own ISAs.

Junior ISAs, introduced in 2011, replaced the Child Trust Fund.

With a few exceptions, such as from an employee share ownership plan, all investor contributions must be in cash, not kind. Adult ISAs are available to UK residents aged over 16, provided that they have a National Insurance number, but individuals between 16 and 18 are only permitted to use the adult cash component or can use a Junior ISA.

There are four broad types of adult ISA: cash, stocks and shares, innovative finance (including peer-to-peer lending) and lifetime.

=== 1999 Transition from older types of ISA ===
PEPs became stocks and shares ISAs, with an exemption that allowed them to continue to hold investments that could not be held in a stocks and shares ISA, provided that the investment met the pre-2001 PEP rules.

For some time there were Mini ISAs, Maxi ISAs and TESSA-only ISAs. A Mini ISA could hold cash OR stocks, potentially many if operated by a fund house or platform, while a Maxi ISA could hold cash AND stocks. Any UK resident individual aged 18 or over could invest in one 'maxi' ISA per year, with both components provided by a single financial institution. Alternatively, a person could invest in two 'mini' ISAs, one for each component. The two mini ISAs could be with two different providers if the investor wished.

The TESSA-only ISA was a type of cash ISA funded from a TESSA, another predecessor of the ISA. New TESSAs could not be created after 5 April 1999, so the required five-year term of all TESSAs ended by 5 April 2004. TOISAs were created to allow the original capital (excluding interest) invested in a TESSA (up to £9,000) to be reinvested in a tax-free form.

=== CAT standards 1999-2005 ===
In April 1999, the Government introduced a voluntary CAT standard for ISAs (standing for "Charges, Access, and Terms") to make them easier for inexperienced customers to understand and with the intention that lower costs would attract more investors. The standard does not guarantee the investment performance or that investors would buy or be sold the right type of investment.

Many equity funds also meet the CAT standards, but the restriction on costs generally means that these funds are index funds, which require little management and simply follow a given index, such as the FTSE 100 Index.

CAT standards were discontinued by the Treasury on 6 April 2005 following the introduction of the stakeholder product suite, although existing CAT standard ISAs continued on the same terms and conditions.

=== 2007/8/9 limit changes ===
In the March 2007 Budget the limits for the 2008/9 tax year were increased. From tax year 2008/2009 the distinction between a Mini and Maxi ISA was abolished.

An insurance component was available in both Maxi and Mini ISAs until the 2005/06 tax year. Collective investment funds that once qualified for this component were reclassified as qualifying for either the Cash or Stocks & Shares component.

=== Past subscription limits ===
Tax year	Cash limit	Stocks & shares limit	Total subscription limit	Junior ISA limit
1999/2000 to 2007/2008 (mini)	£3,000	£4,000	£7,000	not available
1999/2000 to 2007/2008 (maxi)	£3,000	£7,000	£7,000	not available
2008/2009	£3,600	£7,200	£7,200	not available
2009/2010	£3,600 (£5,100 for over 50s from 6 Oct 2009)	£7,200	£7,200 (£10,200 for over 50s)	not available
2010/2011	£5,100	£10,200	£10,200	not available
2011/2012	£5,340	£10,680	£10,680	£3,600
2012/2013	£5,640	£11,280	£11,280	£3,600
2013/2014	£5,760	£11,520	£11,520	£3,720
2014/2015; From 1 July 2014	£5,940 £15,000	£11,880 £15,000	£11,880 £15,000	£3,840 £4,000
2015/2016 to 2016/17	£15,240	£15,240	£15,240	£4,080
2017/2018	£20,000	£20,000	£20,000	£4,128
2018/2019	£20,000	£20,000	£20,000	£4,260

In the March 2010 Budget the then Chancellor of the Exchequer Alistair Darling announced that in future years the limits would rise annually with inflation, rounded to the nearest £120, to ease the arithmetic for those using monthly payment schemes. From 2013 to 2014 the inflation index used was changed from RPI to CPI.

The Chancellor of the Exchequer George Osborne announced in the March 2014 Budget that the adult ISA limit would be increased to £15,000 from 1 July 2014, and the Junior ISA limit to £4,000. From that date savers were allowed to invest the full amount as cash or stocks and shares, or a mix of both. Savers are also able to switch stocks and shares ISAs to cash ISAs.

=== Restrictions removed from July 2014 ===
Many restrictions were significantly relaxed from 1 July 2014 and the branding "New ISA" was introduced for this batch of changes:

- There was a ban on transferring from S&S ISA to cash ISA. Cash to S&S was allowed from 2008/2009. A JISA could always go in both directions.
- Interest on cash in a S&S ISA is no longer subject to a 20% charge. All cash in a S&S ISA is subject to the FCA client money rules and cash ISA providers can opt in if they wish.
- Cash can now be held in a S&S ISA even when not intended for investment. There was no specific time limit on how long cash could be held under the old rules, just whether the ISA manager believed the money was being held for future investment.
- The S&S ISA had a five years remaining at time of purchase restriction on public debt securities such as government, corporate bonds, debentures and Eurobonds. Conditional redemption, such as that based on possible future market performance, was acceptable, as was the borrowing company or government redeeming the security early or exercising of options if there are defaults, insolvency risks or covenant breaches.
- The S&S ISA had a requirement for a credible possibility of losing at least 5% of the investment, called the 5% test. Investments that failed the test had to be held in a cash ISA instead:
  - A cash ISA can still hold qualifying investments that failed the 5% test for holding within a stocks and shares ISA before 1 July 2014 when the test was removed but this facility was rarely, if ever, made available by a cash ISA provider. Such investments would not be deposits and would not have the deposit FSCS protection, they may have the £50,000 investment protection instead, the provider must make the situation clear.

== Types ==
=== Cash ISA ===
An account which enjoys tax-free status, usually deposit accounts with £85,000 Financial Services Compensation Scheme (FSCS) protection (but client money with £50,000 protection or unprotected money is also permitted; the providers are required to make the protection clear). These are normally offered by banks and building societies but investment firms can also offer them. It is mandatory that money held in a cash ISA be made available on request within 15 days but it is permitted to have a loss-of-interest penalty for this, and this is how term deposits are typically made available.

From 6 April 2027, the annual cash ISA subscription limit will be reduced to £12,000 for investors under the age of 65, within the unchanged overall ISA allowance of £20,000. This was announced at the UK Autumn Budget on 26 November 2025. Investors aged 65 and over will keep a £20,000 cash ISA limit, and the limits for stocks and shares and Innovative Finance ISAs will not change. The UK government stated that the aim is to encourage greater retail investment.

To prevent the lower limit being circumvented, transfers from stocks and shares or Innovative Finance ISAs into cash ISAs will not be permitted for under-65s. A flat 22% charge will apply to interest paid on cash held within non-cash ISAs, and a non-cash ISA invested wholly in cash-like assets, initially defined as money market funds only, will become a non-qualifying investment.

==== Help to buy ISA ====
A help to buy ISA, introduced in 2015, is a form of cash ISA that receives a government bonus if the money is used in paying the deposit on a first home purchase. The usual rule that any number of accounts can be held with the same ISA manager applies, and many providers offered the ability to hold both HTB and other cash ISA accounts with current year money in them. However, only one HTB ISA in total can be held, so if one wishes to put current year money into the HTB ISA, any other cash ISA current year money will also have to be paid into a cash ISA with the same provider.

The Lifetime ISA, announced in March 2016, replaces the HTB ISA. HTB accounts could be opened until 30 November 2019 and contributions can continue until 30 November 2029. An account holder can also have a Lifetime ISA, although the government bonus from only one of the accounts per person can be used for a purchase. Transfers from HTB to Lifetime ISA were allowed from the 2017-18 tax year, with transitional arrangements for that year only.

Help to buy ISAs have been criticised:

- Some accounts were promoted with the implication that the bonus could be put towards the deposit on a house purchase, but the bonus is only available on completion of the sale, and thus normally has the effect of reducing the size of the buyer's mortgage.
- It was reported that the scheme – which by mid-2017 had cost taxpayers some £10 billion – had done little to increase the supply of new-build homes, and instead housebuilders had increased prices and thus their profits.

=== Stocks and shares ISA ===
Investors' money is invested in 'qualifying investments', which are:

- cash
- UCITS authorised funds like unit trusts and open-ended investment companies
- investment trusts that satisfy various conditions
- Shares publicly listed on one of the many recognised stock exchanges. Merely being traded is insufficient, it must be a full listing, and this excludes PLUS-quoted and PLUS-traded market segments, but PLUS itself is acceptable; shares in unquoted companies; warrants; futures and options. Since 5 August 2013, AIM shares are allowed in ISAs.
- public debt securities such as government, corporate bonds, debentures and Eurobonds
- from 1 July 2014, some core capital deferred shares issued by building societies, some types of insurance policy and other investments that were previously deemed too low in risk.

It is mandatory that money held in a stocks and shares ISA be made available on request within 30 days but it is permitted to have a loss-of-interest penalty for this.

=== Innovative finance ISA ===
Innovative finance ISAs (IF ISAs or IFISAs) became available from 6 April 2016. They are similar to cash and S&S ISAs but designed to be used for peer-to-peer lending investments, which were not previously eligible to be held in an ISA. Only platforms with full FCA authorisation (and ISA manager status) are eligible to offer IF ISAs; at launch this barred all major existing platforms because they were awaiting authorisation, leaving just eight at the time relatively minor platforms available and 86 awaiting approval. Equity-based crowdfunding, although similar to peer-to-peer lending, is not included in the eligible products for this type of ISA.

From 1 November 2016 many transferable debentures including debt securities and bonds became eligible for inclusion provided they are issued by a company or charity. They can be included whether offered via a P2P platform or not.

The same rules with respect to subscription limits and transfers are applicable to the IF ISA as other adult ISAs, including the restrictions of current year money going to only one ISA manager, and an unrestricted number of managers for past year money.

=== Lifetime ISA ===
In the 2016 Budget it was announced that a lifetime ISA (LISA) would be introduced from 6 April 2017 as a more flexible way to save for both home purchase and retirement. Only those aged 18 to 40 can open an account, and at the end of the tax year (or when used for purchase) a 25% bonus on contributions of up to £4,000 a year will be paid. The £4,000 is part of the overall ISA annual allowance, not in addition to it. On reaching age 50, no more money can be added to the account and eligibility for the 25% bonus ceases, but the account will still earn interest or investment returns. The accounts have the same inheritance tax treatment as other ISAs.

Permitted investments are as for cash or S&S ISAs, and as for them any number of accounts is allowed, but only one account can hold current year money. After the account has been open for at least 12 months, the money can be used for a first home purchased with a mortgage and priced up to £450,000; the money is paid to the conveyancer and can be returned to the ISA if the sale does not complete. There are restrictions in place to avoid abuse of the scheme, for instance those who purchase a home with a LISA are barred from renting the property out. If you and a partner buy a house together, you can both save into a LISA and both put your LISA towards the home.

Money can also be withdrawn after reaching age 60. A person who is diagnosed with a medical condition giving a life expectancy of under one year can withdraw the full amount including bonus without penalty at any age, using the definition in the similar pension law. Any other withdrawal, including transfers to another type of ISA, incurs a 25% charge. Although the bonus and penalty are both 25%, those who withdraw funds for purposes not listed above will suffer a loss, for example:

£1,000 paid in + government bonus at 25% = £1,250 - penalty charge at 25% = £937.50 = net loss of £62.50

Penalty charges were temporarily reduced from 25% to 20% on withdrawals between 6 March 2020 and 5 April 2021 during the recession arising from the COVID-19 pandemic. This reduction ensured that savers making withdrawals received the full amount they had deposited.

£1.5 billion was held in LISA savings in 2022, and the 2022 cost of living crisis fuelled in part by rising inflation led to calls to introduce a temporary penalty-free period to allow access to these savings.

=== Junior ISAs ===
Junior ISAs were introduced on 1 November 2011 with an initial subscription limit of £3,600, which was increased to £9,000 by the time of the 2020-21 tax year. At age 18 the JISA converts to an adult ISA. Like adult ISAs, JISAs are available in both cash and stocks and shares types. Money cannot be withdrawn until age 18 unless a terminal illness claim is agreed or following closure of the account after the death of the child. A child can open their own account from age 16, otherwise a person with parental responsibility can do it. They are available to those who are:

- under age 18 and
- were born on or after 3 Jan 2011 or do not have a child trust fund, and
- are resident and ordinarily resident in the UK, or are a UK Crown servant, married to or in a civil partnership with a Crown servant, or a dependent of a Crown servant.

Unlike an adult ISA a child can only hold a total of one cash ISA and one stocks and shares ISA, including for all money from past years, but transfers of these two accounts can be carried out between providers as for adult accounts. Up to the full JISA limit can be used for any combination of cash and stocks and shares ISA subscriptions. An additional adult cash ISA can be held between 16 and 18. In the year in which a child becomes 18 the full adult and child ISA limits can both be used. Unlike adult ISAs a JISA allows transfers from the S&S form to the cash form.

Each child ISA has a single registered contact, a person with parental responsibility. From age 16 a child can register to be their own contact, and this registration cannot normally be reversed. Except in that case and adoptive parents registering, the previous registered contact will be contacted to obtain their consent to a change of contact.

If the child is disabled to the point that they are not mentally competent, then accessing the money in the account requires court permission, which can cost thousands of pounds. The funds in the account may also be counted against the child when applying for means-tested support.

As of 2026, more than £200 million is believed to be locked in Child Trust Funds intended for the support of disabled people, who are unable to access the funds due to a lack of mental capacity.

=== British ISA ===
A British ISA was announced by the government in its Spring Budget 2024 with an annual allowance of £5,000 to be used only towards investment in UK companies. It was expected that the £5,000 annual subscription would be in addition to the £20,000 ISA allowance. The stated aim of the British ISA was to encourage investment in UK companies.

The government launched a consultation on how a British ISA would work, lasting until June 2024. However, the Labour government elected in July that year decided not to continue with the policy.

Separately, the UK government announced in November 2025 that the cash ISA subscription limit for under-65s would be reduced from April 2027; see Cash ISA.

== Subscription limits ==
There are restrictions on investing in ISAs in each tax year (6 April to the following 5 April) which affect the type of ISA that may be opened and the cumulative amount of investment during the course of that year. The key restrictions are:

- Annual contribution limits are per ISA, so you can contribute to multiple ISA accounts, even possibly using the same manager, within current year money limits, all within the same overall ISA. This is sometimes called a "split ISA".
- No more than the annual amount limit can be paid in. Formerly, the amount of subscription in cash used to be restricted in an adult ISA. Any amount not used for cash can be used in other types of ISA.
- Newly subscribed (paid in) money in the current tax year can only be held in one Individual Savings Account of each type. For example, current year cash ISA subscription money can be held in a help to buy account, instant access accounts, fixed rate accounts, variable rate accounts and deposit accounts with the same cash ISA manager in the same overall ISA even though this is five or more accounts. None could be held in any accounts within another cash ISA elsewhere. The introduction of the help to buy cash ISA made this flexibility within one ISA more significant because it cannot use the full cash limit.
- Provided the annual contribution limits are not exceeded significantly HMRC can be expected to forgive one transgression using too many ISA managers/accounts and merely post a letter reminding about the rules after the annual returns from ISA providers reveal the problem. This should not be relied upon, as it is at HMRC's discretion.

These restrictions only apply to money paid in during the current tax year. For adult ISAs an unlimited number of ISA managers' accounts can hold money from past years and it can be freely moved between managers using ISA transfer requests.

Maximum subscription to each type of ISA
Tax year	Adult ISA (cash, S&S & IF combined)	Lifetime ISA	Junior ISA
2015/16	£15,240	N/A	£4,080
2016/17	£15,240	N/A	£4,080
2017/18	£20,000	£4,000	£4,128
2018/19	£20,000	£4,000	£4,260
2019/20	£20,000	£4,000	£4,368
2020/21	£20,000	£4,000	£9,000
2021/22	£20,000	£4,000	£9,000
2022/23	£20,000	£4,000	£9,000
2023/24	£20,000	£4,000	£9,000
2024/25	£20,000	£4,000	£9,000
2025/26	£20,000	£4,000	£9,000
2026/27	£20,000	£4,000	£9,000

From the 2027/28 tax year, the cash ISA subscription limit will be £12,000 for investors under the age of 65 (£20,000 for those aged 65 and over), within the unchanged £20,000 overall adult ISA limit.

== Transfer rules ==
Transfers between providers are allowed. A transfer from a Cash ISA to another Cash ISA must usually be completed within 15 business days. Any other type of account transfer must usually be completed within 30 days. There are a range of restrictions and workarounds:

- The transfer must be carried out by the managers. If a saver withdraws the money from the existing manager, the subsequent reinvestment will be treated as a new ISA subscription and is subject to the current year's subscription limit. HMRC allows a single cash ISA self-transfer by withdrawing and redepositing per year. All current year money must be removed from the source account.
- When transferring it is still necessary to comply with the rule that you can have only one cash ISA manager and one S&S ISA manager in use at the same time with money paid in from the current tax year. Transfer of cash ISA money paid in during the current year must be all of the money if it is to another cash ISA manager. If the transfer is from cash to another type the transfer can be partial but must be to either the first ISA of the year of that type or to the one already used for current year money. After the transfer to the other type the money counts against its limit, not the cash limit.
- Before transferring stocks from one ISA manager/platform/provider to another it is worth checking that the new provider will accept all the stocks held in your ISA. Providers have different criteria for deciding if a particular stock can or cannot qualify for ISA status within their platform and you may have little choice but to liquidate that stock or withdraw it from the ISA wrapper.
- For current year money you can transfer from a cash ISA to a S&S ISA then withdraw the money from the S&S ISA and redeposit some or all the money into another cash ISA, subject to the annual contribution limit. This allows you to circumvent "new money only" restrictions imposed by some cash ISAs that will not accept transfers in, provided you have sufficient annual allowance available.
- Older products:
  - Whether the original contributions were made to a maxi ISA or a mini ISA has no effect on transfer.
  - Cash within a TOISA (TESSA-only ISA) is treated as a cash component, and can be transferred to a "normal" cash ISA.
- From April 2027, investors under the age of 65 will not be permitted to transfer money from a stocks and shares or Innovative Finance ISA into a cash ISA.

== Flexible ISA Features ==
The Flexible ISA Features are optional add-on feature introduced from 6 April 2016 for any adult ISA type that allow withdrawing cash and redepositing it in the same tax year. Providers are not required to implement the flexibility features and do not have to implement them all if they allow some. A person can withdraw an unlimited amount of money from an account and return up to that amount within the same tax year without it counting against the annual subscription limit. A person with £100,000 of past year money could withdraw say £90,000 on 15 April and redeposit it as desired within the tax year. If a transfer is done the firm receiving the transfer is told only the amount of current year allowance available to be used, if any.

If current year money is withdrawn, that money can be used to subscribe to a different type of ISA in the current year without having to replace it into the flexible ISA it was withdrawn from. This is particularly useful if both current and past year money were withdrawn from the same account. Otherwise all past year money would have to be replaced before any current year money would count as being replaced, due to the rules that current year money is the first withdrawn and last replaced. Past year money does have to be replaced before being transferred in the usual ISA transfer way, it must not be directly placed into the new account or it would count as a new current year subscription instead of a replacement.

== Tax treatment ==
Interest on cash held in an ISA, including stocks and shares ISAs, is not subject to income tax. From April 2027, a 22% charge will apply to interest paid on cash held within non-cash ISAs.

Dividends are not subject to additional tax, interest on bonds is not taxed, and capital gains are not taxed (nor may capital losses be used to offset other gains).

There is no need to report interest or other income, capital gains, or trades to HMRC as it is not taxable income. This is a considerable paperwork reduction for active traders or those who may otherwise be required to report their trades because they have total sales value exceeding four times the annual CGT allowance, which outside a tax wrapper would require that all trades be reported even if there is no capital gains tax to pay.

Since the income is not taxable it did not count for age-related personal income tax allowance reduction when that extra allowance existed.

=== Death of investor ===
Cash or investments held in ISAs are ordinarily subject to Inheritance Tax when the account holder dies, if their estate is valued above the IHT nil-rate band. Since August 2013 it became possible to hold AIM-listed shares in a stocks and shares ISA, some of which qualify for business relief; in this way a stocks and shares ISA portfolio consisting of these securities can be gifted without being subject to Inheritance Tax, provided the qualifying securities have been held for at least two years upon death.

For deaths of ISA investors on or after 3 December 2014, the surviving spouse or civil partner can apply for an increased ISA allowance in the form of an Additional Permitted Subscription. This allowance is separate from the normal annual allowance, and is based on the value of the deceased's ISA; it is available whether or not the surviving spouse or civil partner inherited the ISA assets.

== Fund supermarkets and self-select ISA providers ==
There is no legal distinction between a fund supermarket and a self-select ISA provider. These are merely marketing terms used by stocks and shares ISA providers to distinguish the type of business that they tend to seek. Firms favouring collective investment business will often call themselves fund supermarkets, while firms who focus on share dealing will often call themselves self-select ISA providers. A firm can freely offer all types of permitted investment, regardless of its name, and many do. Others choose to offer only collective investment funds. An individual may not be the provider for their own ISA.

Except for fund houses, it is usual for providers to offer the facility to hold funds managed by many different organisations.

Prior to the effect of the Retail Distribution Review it was normal for S&S providers to be paid by fund managers out of their usual charges, though some may have both explicit dealing charges and collect the commission while others may make charges and refund all commission. This is now prohibited for new customers who must be charged a fee instead. In the current transition period existing customers may be able to hold a mixture of commission paying investments and the "clean" versions that do not pay commission, perhaps paying a platform fee only for the clean portion. Some providers have chosen to be clean only. Some commission may be rebated to customers but this is not required.

== Charges ==
The ISA cash component normally has no disclosed charges. The company can make money from the differences between its deposit and lending rates, fees, differences between wholesale and retail deposit rates or other means. For example, Hargreaves Lansdown quoted a 0.8% profit margin on cash held in its Vantage platform in spring 2014. Some providers charge a fee for transferring to another provider.

The built-in annual "re-registering" of an ISA may attract a fee which may be automatically extracted from an account, though this is normally done only by firms specialising in share deals, not those using funds or both funds and shares.

Stocks and shares ISA fund supermarkets often reduce some or all of the initial and annual charges made by fund houses to below the level paid when purchasing direct from the fund provider, often to zero initial charge. Some providers levy dealing charges even for fund transactions, typically firms desiring direct share investments more than fund investments. Dealing charges for shares are normal even from providers that do not charge for fund transactions. Firms that primarily focus on fund transactions tend to have higher share dealing charges than providers specialising in share transactions.

== Similar schemes in other countries ==
Non-pension products:

- Tax-Free Savings Account (TFSA) (Canada)
- Plan d'épargne en actions (PEA) (France) has a lifetime contribution limit of €140,000. The tax advantages are lost if money is withdrawn in the first 5 years
- Assurance-vie en France (France)
- Livret A (France)
- Tax-Free Savings Account (TFSA) (South Africa) has an annual contribution limit of ZAR 36,000 and a lifetime contribution limit of ZAR 500,000
- Индивидуальный инвестиционный счет (Individual Investment Account, Russia) has an annual contribution limit of RUB 1,000,000. The tax advantages are lost if the account is closed in the first three years. Investments are restricted to securities listed on Russian exchanges. Investors can choose between a 13% tax deduction on contributions to the account or tax-free withdrawal on account closure.
- Piano Individuale di Risparmio (Individual Savings Plan, PIR) (Italy) has an annual contribution limit of €30,000 and a lifetime contribution limit of €150,000. The tax advantages are lost if money is withdrawn within 5 years. 70% of the investment must be in shares of companies with a presence in Italy and within that, 30% must be in shares of small or medium enterprises; these requirements can be addressed by investing in a PIR-compliant fund. The PIR was introduced in 2017
- Investeringssparkonto (ISK) (Sweden) is not completely tax-free as there is a 30% capital gains tax on a relatively low assumed gain, for which the rate is set annually; for example, for 2025 the tax rate will be 0.888% of assets in the account.
- Aksjesparekonto (Share Savings Account, ASK) (Norway) allows gains and (since 2019) dividends on shares in EEA-domiciled companies and mutual funds to compound tax-free within the account, with tax payable on withdrawals.
- Aktiesparekonto (Share Savings Account, ASK) (Denmark) was introduced in 2019. It had an initial annual contribution limit of DKK 50,000, rising to DKK 200,000 in 2022 and is taxed at a reduced rate of 17% on distributions and on capital gains (realised and unrealised).
- Osakesäästötili (Equity Savings Account) (Finland) was introduced in 2020. It has a lifetime contribution limit of EUR 50,000 and provides tax free trading within the account. On withdrawal or closure, normal capital gains taxes are realised.
- Tartós befektetési számla (Long-term investment account) (Hungary)

Pensions:

- Superannuation in Australia
- Individual retirement account (IRA), the Roth IRA type is close except for its extra restrictions, and Roth 401(k) (United States)
- Nippon individual savings account (NISA), a Japanese account with the system modeled after the UK and an annual cumulative limit of 3.6 million yen.
- Personal Retirement Savings Account (PRSA) - Ireland

== See also ==
- Self-invested personal pension
