= Livret A =

French financial product

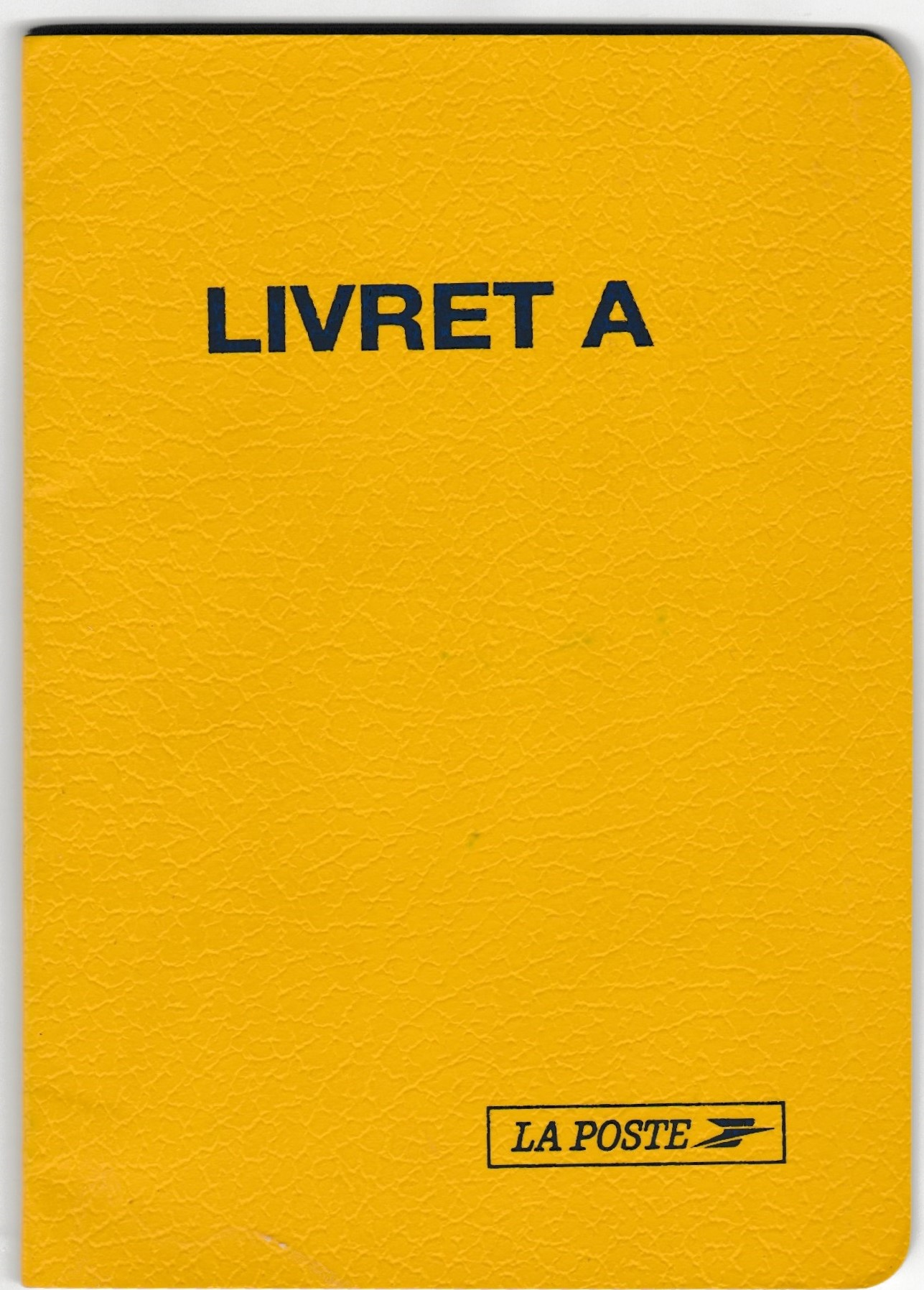
Cover of an old Livret A.

The Livret A is a financial product offered by French banks. Established in 1818 by King Louis XVIII to pay back the debts incurred during the Napoleonic Wars, part of the funds are now transferred to and re-invested by the Caisse des dépôts et consignations, owned by the French state, to build HLM, or social housing, and repay debt. The remaining funds are used by banks to give loans to French small and medium-sized enterprises. The product acts as a savings account for French citizens and residents, and the annual returns are not taxed. In December 2024, it was owned by 56 million individuals, for a total amount of 442.5 billion euros.

== Early history ==
The Livret A was established in 1818 by King Louis XVIII to pay back the debts incurred during the Napoleonic Wars. The funds are held and re-invested through the Caisse des dépôts et consignations, founded in 1816.

In the 19th century, the funds were used to build railroad tracks and canals throughout France. Between World War I and World War II, it was used to install electricity in rural France.

Since 1945, it has mostly been used to build social housing and urbanism projects.

== Investments ==
Part of the funds are invested through the Caisse des dépôts et consignations, which is fully owned by the French state. In 2011, a decree issued by the Prime Minister suggested that French banks had to transfer 60% of all funds from the Livrets A to the Caisse des dépôts. Prior to the decree, La Banque postale was the only bank to transfer 100% of all funds from the Livret A to the Caisse des dépôts, while the Groupe Caisse d'Épargne transferred 80%. Commercial banks like the Société générale or the Crédit agricole only transferred between 20% and 30%. All French banks have by 2022 to transfer 60% to the Caisse des dépôts.

Through the Caisse des dépôts, the funds are mostly used to build new social housing known as HLM. They are also used to repay debt. They are also used to strengthen the collateral of French banks, and to give loans to French small and medium-sized enterprises and territorial entities (like towns, departments, etc.). Finally, the funds are invested in AAA and BBB-rated stocks and Treasury bonds.

The remaining funds are used by banks to give loans to French small and medium-sized enterprises. The 2024 budget bill included an amendment that opened the way for deposits in Livret A savings accounts to be used to finance France's defence industrial base.

== 2008-present ==
The product was only offered by La Banque Postale and the Groupe Caisse d'Épargne as of 2008. Since January 2009, it has been offered by all French banks.

As of 2015, only one account may be held by an individual, with an amount from 10 Euros to 22,950 Euros. During the 2012 French presidential election, François Hollande, who was elected as the President of France, announced his intention to raise the individual amount to 30,600 Euros to build 150,000 new HLMs.

In 2008, 46 million French citizens or residents owned a Livret A, for a total amount of 128,1 billion Euros in late 2007. As of January 2012, 60 million owned one, for a total amount of 220,8 billion Euros.

In 2010, it has an annual rate of return of 4%. In January 2012, it had an annual rate of return of 2,25%. By 2015, it had fallen to 1%. By 2016, it had fallen to 0,75%. By 2020, it had fallen to 0,5%. On 1 February 2022, the rate was increased to 1% because of inflation. The rate doubled to 2% on 1 August 2022, its highest rate in nearly 10 years.

== See also ==
- Euro area crisis
