= Stráž nad Nisou =

- Municipality
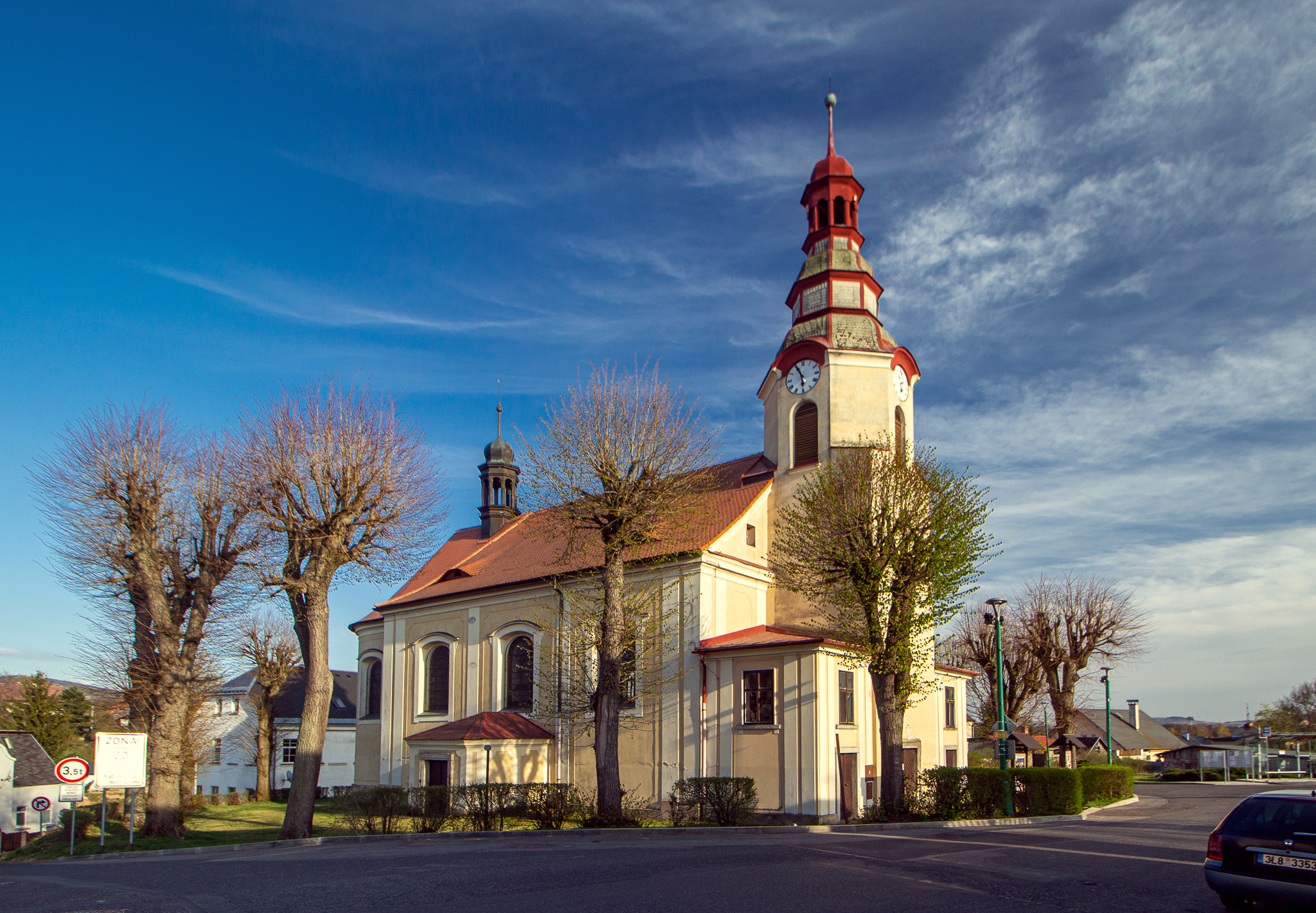
- Church of Saint Catherine

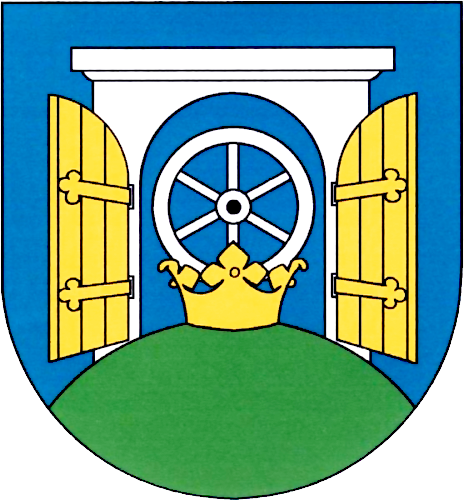
- Flag Coat of arms

- Location in the Czech Republic
- Coordinates: 50°47′28″N 15°1′37″E
- Country: Czech Republic
- Region: Liberec
- District: Liberec
- First mentioned: 1469

Area
  - Total: 4.53 km^{2} (1.75 sq mi)
- Elevation: 360 m (1,180 ft)

Population (2026-01-01)
  - Total: 2,448
  - Density: 540/km^{2} (1,400/sq mi)
- Time zone: UTC+1 (CET)
  - Summer (DST): UTC+2 (CEST)
- Postal code: 463 03
- Website: www.straznnis.cz

Stráž nad Nisou (until 1947 Starý Habendorf; German: Althabendorf) is a municipality and village in Liberec District in the Liberec Region of the Czech Republic. It has about 2,400 inhabitants. The municipality forms an enclave in the territory of Liberec.

== Administrative division ==
Stráž nad Nisou consists of two municipal parts (in brackets population according to the 2021 census):

- Stráž nad Nisou (2,254)
- Svárov (87)

== Etymology ==
The initial German name of the settlement was Habendorf, meaning "Habe's village". The modern Czech name means 'guard upon the Nisa'.

== Geography ==
Stráž nad Nisou is located northwest of the centre of Liberec and forms an enclave in the territory of Liberec. It lies in the Zittau Basin. The highest point is at 427 m (1,401 ft) above sea level. The town is situated at the confluence of the Lusatian Neisse and Černá Nisa rivers.

== History ==
The first written mention of Habendorf is from 1469. Although the village developed slowly due to the inhospitable conditions and in 1550 it consisted of only 11 houses, it served as a cultural centre for the surrounding villages. After the Battle of White Mountain in 1620, Habensdorf was acquired by Albrecht von Wallenstein. After his death, it became property of Matthias Gallas. The Gallas family and then the Clam-Gallas family owned the estate until 1945.

From the 17th century, there were flax manufactories here, which later became the first textile factory in the region. In 1804, the first steam engine in Bohemia was installed here.

In 1761, the village of Neuhabendorf / Nový Habendorf ('new Habendorf') was founded nearby, and from then Habendorf was called Althabendorf / Starý Habendorf ('old Habendorf'). The two villages grew together urbanistically and were administratively merged in 1911. In 1916, the municipality was promoted to a market town, but later lost the title. In 1947, the municipality was renamed from Starý Habendorf to its current name.

Ethnic Germans formed the majority until World War II. In 1938, the municipality was annexed by Nazi Germany. From 1938 to 1945, it was administered as part of the Reichsgau Sudetenland. During the war, parts for aircraft and other war needs were produced here. After the war, the Germans were expelled and the municipality was partly resettled by Czechs.

== Demographics ==
Historical population

Year	Pop.	±%
1869	2,102	—
1880	2,116	+0.7%
1890	2,224	+5.1%
1900	2,404	+8.1%
1910	2,811	+16.9%

Year	Pop.	±%
1921	2,515	−10.5%
1930	2,715	+8.0%
1950	1,604	−40.9%
1961	1,734	+8.1%
1970	1,653	−4.7%

Year	Pop.	±%
1980	1,550	−6.2%
1991	1,618	+4.4%
2001	1,772	+9.5%
2011	2,107	+18.9%
2021	2,341	+11.1%

Source: Censuses

== Transport ==
The I/35 expressway (part of the European route E442) from Liberec to the Czech–German border runs through the municipality.

Stráž nad Nisou is located on the railway lines heading from Liberec to Jindřichovice pod Smrkem and to Černousy.

== Sights ==
The main landmark of Stráž nad Nisou is the Church of Saint Catherine. It was built in the Renaissance style in 1599 and rebuilt in the Baroque style in 1727–1728.
