= Nyssa =

Nyssa may refer to:

== Places ==
- Nyssa (Alexander), a town spared by Alexander the Great in his invasion of Central Asia
- Nyssa (Cappadocia), a Roman city and bishopric
- Nyssa (Caria), a Hellenistic city, Asian Turkey
- Nyssa (Lycia), an ancient city, Asian Turkey
- Nyssa, Oregon, a city in the United States

== Fictional characters ==
- Nyssa (Doctor Who), a companion of the fifth Doctor Who
- Nyssa Raatko, an adversary of Batman

== Other uses ==
- Nyssa (musician), 21st century Canadian singer-songwriter
- Nyssa (plant), the genus name for tupelo trees
- New York State Snowmobile Association
- New York State Sociological Association

== See also ==
- Gregory of Nyssa (335–395), 4th-century Christian bishop, theologian, and saint
- Neisse (disambiguation)
- Nisa (disambiguation)
- Nissa (disambiguation)
- Nisse (disambiguation)
- Nysa (disambiguation)
