= Kanal 1 (Bosnia and Herzegovina) =

- Country: Bosnia and Herzegovina
- Broadcast area: Bosnia and Herzegovina
- Headquarters: Sarajevo

Programming
- Language(s): Bosnian
- Picture format: 16:9 576i (SDTV)

Ownership
- Owner: Solid State Productions d.o.o. Sarajevo
- Key people: Adni Isaković (General Director)

History
- Launched: 2010

Links
- Website: www.kanal1.ba

Availability

Streaming media
- Online player: Available at website

Kanal 1 or K1 is the first Bosnian cable music channel based in Sarajevo. This channel mainly broadcasts the latest music videos of domestic and foreign rock, pop and hip hop artists. The program is produced in Bosnian language. Kanal 1 is available via cable systems and IPTV platforms throughout the Bosnia and Herzegovina.

"Kanal 1" TV studio at headquarters in Sarajevo

== Kanal 1 Line-up ==
Daily program scheme on Kanal 1 consists of several music playlists, talk shows, European films and series.

=== TV shows ===
- Sudo Show – talk show about various topics from everyday life and society hosted by "Director Sudo" and "mysterious Sarajevo stars"
- Ministarstvo Kulture – (Ministry of Culture) the show hosted by renowned Bosnian artist Damir Nikšić, dedicated to the promotion of cultural and artistic achievements
- Izvan Svake Kontrole or ISK – (Outside any control) The show which was conceived as an "online presentation" eponymous radio show that is broadcast on Radio 202 (former part of RTVFBiH public service). An integral part of TV shows and makes web portal (ISK Webzine) where you can read reviews, articles and many other interesting activities from the world of rock and roll and film industry.
- Novi BH Zvuk or ISK – (The new BH Sound)"" – a music TV show dedicated to local musicians led by famous Bosnian musicians.
- Šortz – is a TV show that is intended for fans of experimental film art and offers short films of different genres.

=== Foreign series ===
- The Old Guys – British comedy television series produced by BBC Scotland
- Mad Dogs – British black comedy and psychological thriller television series produced by Left Bank Pictures, and co-produced by Palma Pictures
- luther – British psychological crime drama television series produced by BBC One
- Top Gear – British television show about motor vehicles, primarily cars etc.
