= NISA Investment Advisors =

American investment management firm

NISA Investment Advisors, LLC
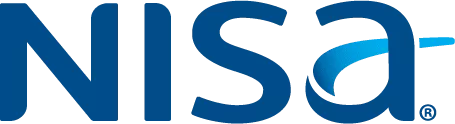

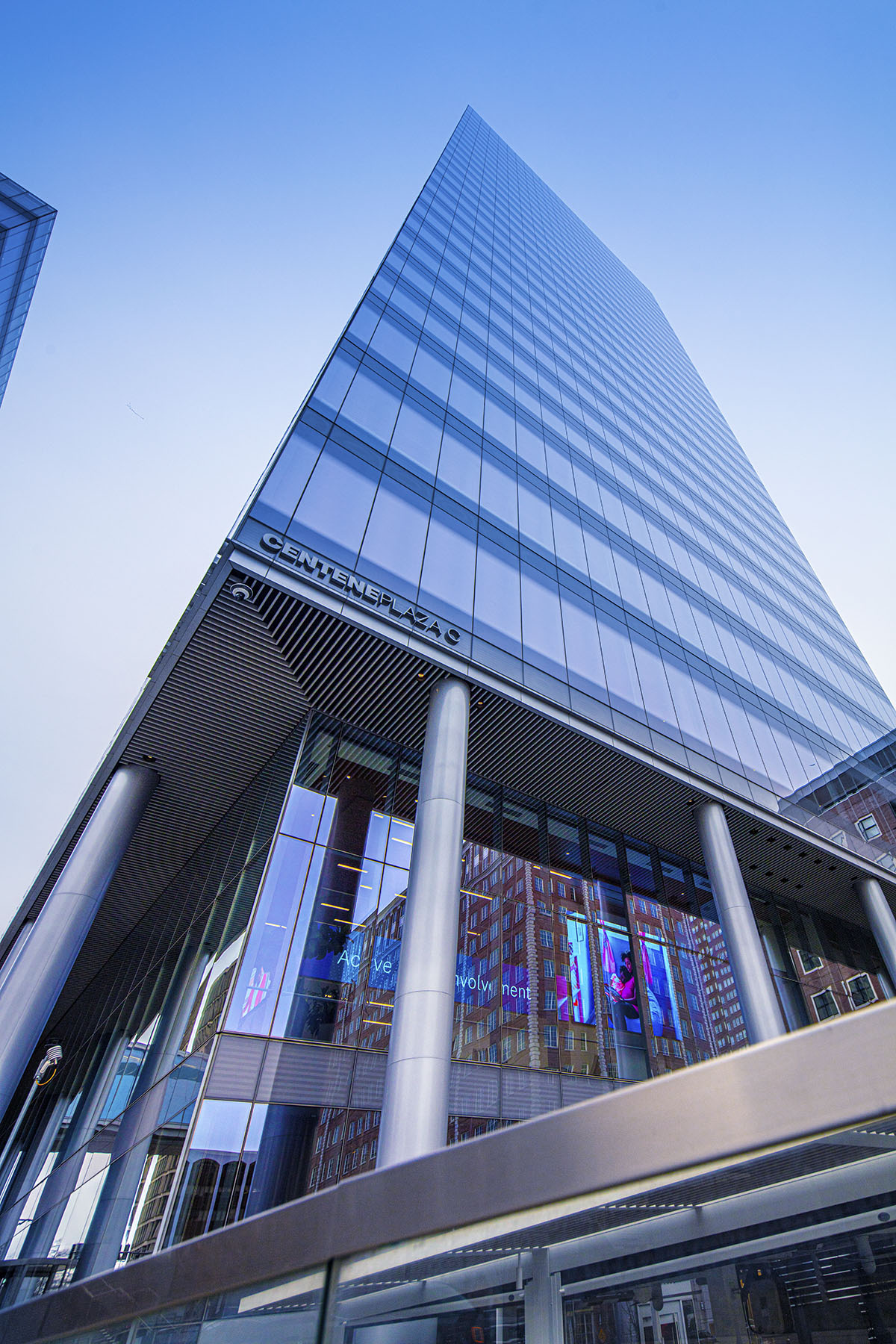
- Headquarters in Clayton, Missouri
- Type: Private
- Industry: Investment management
- Predecessor: National Investment Services of America
- Founded: 1994; 32 years ago
- Founders: Jess Yawitz; Bill Marshall
- Headquarters: Clayton, Missouri, U.S.
- Key people: David Eichhorn (CEO)
- AUM: US$483 billion (June, 30 2026)
- Number of employees: 400+ (June, 30 2026)
- Website: www.nisa.com

NISA Investment Advisors (NISA) is an American asset management firm headquartered in Clayton, Missouri.

== History ==
The predecessor of NISA was National Investment Services of America, an investment management firm based in Milwaukee, Wisconsin. In 1994, National Investment Services of America split up into three separate entities. Jess Yawitz and Bill Marshall who were employees there founded one of the three separate entities, NISA Investment Advisors. Prior to this both of them were faculty members of Olin Business School at Washington University in St. Louis who then moved to New York City to work at Goldman Sachs. When the firm started it had 20 employees and had $3.9 billion in AUM. Originally NISA remained in Milwaukee but later moved to Clayton.

In 2017, Marshall and Yawitz sold their ownership stakes in the firm to senior management. Marshall and Yawitz retired from their roles of managing the firm in 2018 and at the end of 2021 respectively. David Eichhorn who was with firm since 1999, was selected to succeed them as CEO of the firm.

In April 2025, NISA added a quantitative investing team to handle its new quantitative equity strategy.

NISA is 100% employee-owned.
