= Niceness =

Niceness may refer to:

- Agreeableness, a personality trait
- Kindness, a behavior
- Pleasure, an experience
- "Niceness", a song by Jamie Saft and the New Zion Trio on Fight Against Babylon
- Niceness value, a measurement used in Unix and Unix-like systems

== See also ==
- Nice (disambiguation)
- Iowa nice
- Minnesota nice
- Southern hospitality
