= NICE (disambiguation) =

NICE may refer to:

== Organizations ==
- National Independent Cadres and Elites, an Iraqi political party
- National Information & Credit Evaluation, a Korean comprehensive credit information provider
- National Institute for Health and Care Excellence, UK
- National Immigration and Customs Enforcement, a proposed name for ICE endorsed by Donald Trump
- National Initiative for Civic Education in Malawi

=== Education ===
- Noorul Islam College of Engineering, a former name of Noorul Islam Centre for Higher Education, Kumarakoil, India
- Northern Idaho College of Education, a former name of Lewis–Clark State College in Lewiston, Idaho, US

=== Companies ===
- NICE Car Company, a distributor of electric vehicles in London
- NICE Ltd., a contact center as a service (CCaaS) provider headquartered in Hoboken, New Jersey, US

== Places ==
- Nusantara International Convention Exhibition, a convention center in Pantai Indah Kapuk 2 within Tangerang Regency, Banten, Indonesia

== Science and technology ==
- Neutral Ion Coupling Explorer, a candidate Small Explorer program spacecraft
- NICE classification (Narrow-band imaging International Colorectal Endoscopic), of colorectal polyps

== Transportation ==
- NICE Road, also known as the Bengaluru–Mysore Infrastructure Corridor, India
- Nassau Inter-County Express, a bus system in Nassau County, New York, US

== Other uses ==
- International (Nice) Classification of Goods and Services, a system for registering trademarks
- National Institute for Coordinated Experiments, a fictional organisation in C.S. Lewis' novel That Hideous Strength

== See also ==
- Nice (disambiguation)
- Nice Classification (disambiguation)
