= Blue Elephant =

Blue Elephant may refer to:

- The Blue Elephant
- Blue Elephant Corporation, a South Korean eyewear brand
- Blue Elephant Theatre
