= NAIS =

NAIS can mean:

- National Animal Identification System in the US to assist tracking of animals in the food chain
- National Association of Independent Schools in the USA
- Nord Anglia International School Dubai, also known as NAS Dubai, an international school located in Dubai.
- Nord Anglia International School Pudong
- upper sideband, an amplitude modulation transmission method by radio
- NASA Acquisition Internet Service, web access to current acquisition information

== See also ==
- Nais (disambiguation)
