= Nais (disambiguation) =

Naïs is an eighteenth-century opera by Jean-Philippe Rameau.

Nais may also refer to:

- Naïs (film), a 1945 French film
- Nais (Lydia), a town of ancient Lydia
- Naïs (mythology), several women in Greek mythology

== Biology ==
- Nais (fungus), a genus of fungi in the family Halosphaeriaceae
- Nais (annelid), a genus of oligochaete worms in the family Naididae
- Nais, an invalid genus of butterflies in the family Lycaenidae; nowadays part of Chrysoritis

== See also ==
- NAIS (disambiguation)
- Nise (disambiguation)
- Nice (disambiguation)
- Gneiss, a type of metamorphic rock
