= Nice (disambiguation) =

Nice is a city in the south of France.

Nice may also refer to:

== Places ==
- Arrondissement of Nice, an arrondissement (subdivision type) of France around the city of Nice
- County of Nice, a historical region of France
- İznik, Turkey, formerly known as Nicaea, and which Edward Gibbon refers to as Nice throughout The History of the Decline and Fall of the Roman Empire
- Nice (Thrace), a town of ancient Thrace
- Nice, California, a town in the United States

== People ==
- Nice (surname)

As a first name:

- Nice Githinji (b. 1985), Kenyan actress, producer, TV show host
- Nice Nailantei Leng'ete (b. 1991), Kenyan human rights activist

=== Fictional characters ===
- Nice (mythology), a daughter of Thespius, mother of Nicodromus in Greek mythology
- Captain Nice, titular character of the eponymous U.S. TV show
- Ultraman Nice, titular character of the eponymous Japanese TV show
- Nice Holystone, explosives enthusiast in the Baccano! series

== Technology ==
- Nice (mobile app), a photo-sharing app in China
- nice (Unix), a command found on UNIX and other POSIX-like operating systems
- NICE Ltd., a technology company specializing in customer management software

== Arts and entertainment ==
=== Television ===
- "Nice", the original title of "Miss Teacher Bangs a Boy", a South Park episode

=== Music ===
- The Nice, a 1960s rock band
  - Nice (The Nice album), a 1969 album by The Nice
- Nice (band), a 1990s indie rock group from Australia
  - Nice (Nice album), a self-titled 1994 album by Nice
- Nice (Rollins Band album), 2001
- Nice (Puffy AmiYumi album), 2003
- "Nice" (song), a single from the 2004 album Astronaut by Duran Duran
- "Nice", a song from the 2025 album Star by 2hollis
- "Nice", a song from the 2007 album Exclusive by Chris Brown

== Companies and organizations ==
- OGC Nice, a French football club based in Nice
- National Institute for Health and Care Excellence, an executive non-departmental public body of the Department of Health and Social Care in England

== Adjective ==
- Nice model, a scenario for the dynamical evolution of the Solar System
- Nice name, a set theoretical concept used in mathematics
- "Nice" object, an object or phenomenon that is not pathological in mathematical analysis
- Nice guy

== Other ==
- Nice (WIPO), a classification system used in trademarks
- Nice!, a private label brand of Walgreens
- Nice biscuit, a variety of biscuit
- 326732 Nice, an asteroid

== See also ==
- NICE (disambiguation)
- Gneiss (pronounced in the same way as "nice"), a type of metamorphic rock
- Niceness (disambiguation)
- Nise (disambiguation)
- Nais (disambiguation)
