= Iowa nice =

Cultural label of Iowans stereotyped as nice and friendly

Iowa nice is a cultural label used to describe the stereotypical attitudes and behaviors of residents within the U.S. state of Iowa, particularly in terms of the friendly agreeableness and emotional trust shown by individuals who are otherwise strangers. While the term's precise meaning is difficult to define, 'Iowa nice' as a concept has been touched upon by both national publications such as The Huffington Post and Iowan publications such as The Gazette and The Quad City Times. It can be analogized to the similar notions of Minnesota nice and Southern hospitality.

== Definition ==
While without a strict definition, Iowa nice is seen to generally refer to helpful actions such as pulling over to a roadside to help a stranger change a tire. The term is also applied to a general atmosphere of social toleration in which the discrimination and prejudice more accepted in other places of the U.S. is absent or downplayed. A specific example being how the Des Moines Human Rights Commission came into being in 1951 compared to the national agencies promoted over a decade later by Lyndon B. Johnson and created through the Civil Rights Act of 1964.

Social commentators such as Eric Scott of The Huffington Post have stated that the concept's limits deserve more attention even as its positive sides remain strong. He wrote in 2017 that Iowa nice has "led to complacency and an expectation that issues needing to be addressed will be handled by our local leaders." Writing for The Gazette, a publication based out of Cedar Rapids, Rev. Mel Schlachter of Iowa City has argued that while "conflict avoidance can be a downside" of the state ethos and needed confrontations can get put aside, the concept still results in an atmosphere of "hospitality and cordiality all the way" through society that enhances the quality of life.

== Analysis ==
In statistical terms, a national study published in the scholarly journal Perspectives on Psychological Science by researchers Peter Rentfrow, Samuel Gosling, and Jeff Potter in 2008 analyzed personality traits of individuals in different parts of the U.S. The scholars found that Iowans scored as the fifteenth most agreeable and fifteenth most extraverted Americans compared to those of the other 49 states.

== Usage ==
During the 2018 student walk-outs and social protests over gun violence, multiple students in the Des Moines area demonstrated using slogans that they were "done being Iowa nice."

== Related concepts ==
It can be analogized to the similar notions of Minnesota nice and Southern hospitality. Iowa's neighboring state of Nebraska adopted "Nebraska nice" as a tourism slogan in 2018, after several decades of its use in reference to Nebraska's stadium having a reputation as having the "nicest fans in college football." The concept of a Seattle Freeze can function as a kind of antonym.

== See also ==
- Agreeableness
- Emotional trust
- Politics of Iowa
- Seattle Freeze
