= Blue Elephant (company) =

South Korean eyewear brand

Blue Elephant Corporation
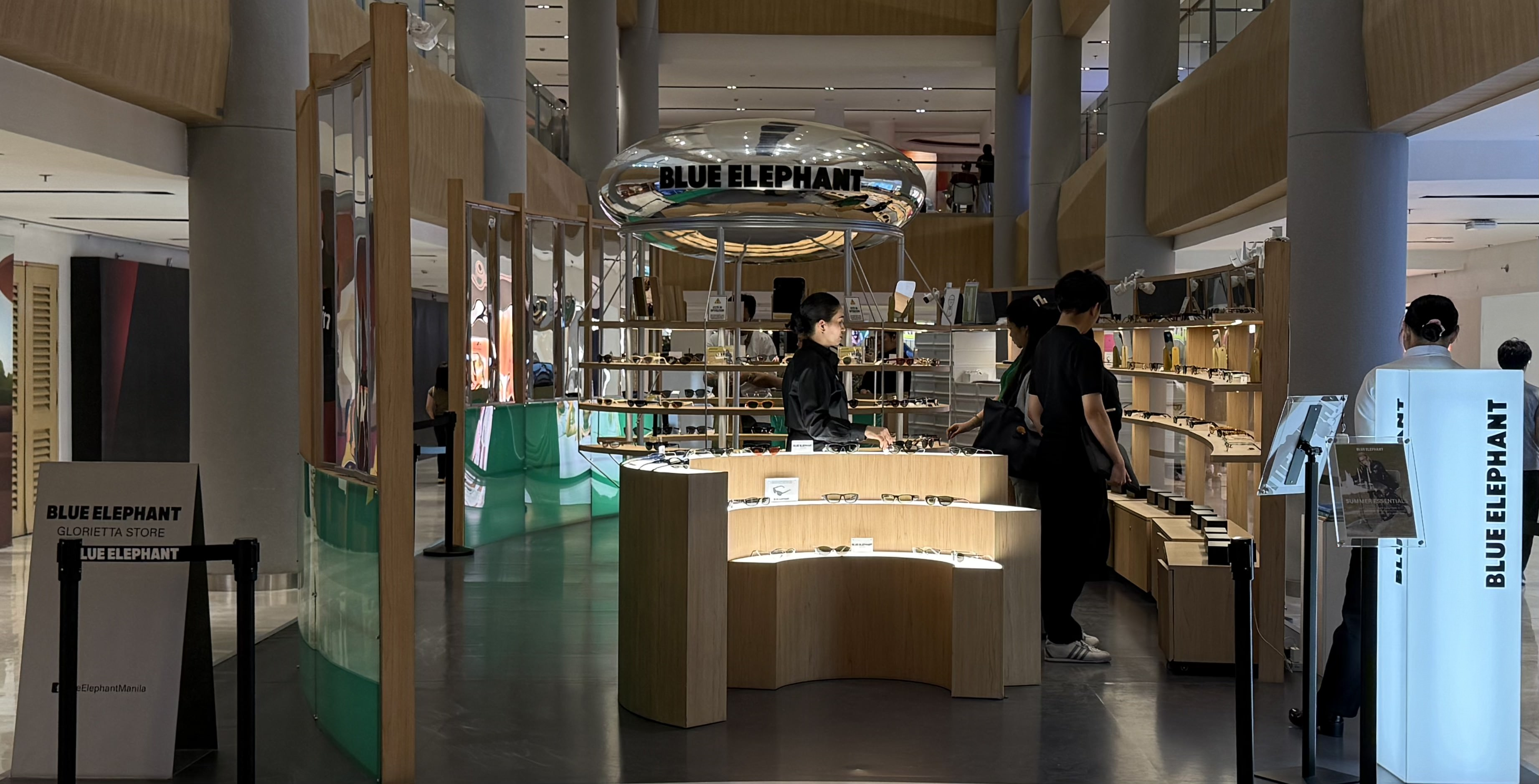
- A Blue Elephant pop-up store in Makati
- Native name: 블루엘리펀트
- Type: Private
- Industry: Eyewear
- Founded: 31 January 2019; 7 years ago
- Headquarters: Seongdong District, Seoul, South Korea
- Area served: Worldwide
- Key people: Ko Kyung-min (CEO and CLO); Yoo In-cheol (CEO and CFO)
- Products: Eyeglasses; Sunglasses
- Number of employees: 170 (2026)
- Website: blueelephant.co

Blue Elephant (Korean: 블루엘리펀트, stylized in all caps) is a South Korean brand of eyewear, including sunglasses and optical frames. The brand was founded in 2019 as an online business and later expanded into physical retail locations in South Korea, Japan, the Philippines, and the United States. The company operates 25 locations worldwide as of 2025, with nine more planned.

Blue Elephant has been described by business and fashion publications as a lower-priced eyewear brand, with products commonly positioned below the prices of luxury eyewear brands. The company has also been the subject of legal proceedings involving allegations that some products and store interiors copied designs associated with Gentle Monster.

== History ==
Blue Elephant was founded on 31 January 2019 as an online eyewear brand. The company's early growth was associated with lower-priced eyewear and the expansion of physical stores in high-traffic commercial areas in South Korea.

The brand's first store opened in Seoul Forest. In 2024, Blue Elephant expanded to locations including Yongsan District, Bukchon Hanok Village, Hannam-dong, Seongsu-dong, Dosan Park, Yeonnam, Hongdae and Myeong-dong, and operated 16 stores in South Korea, including Jeju Island, by the end of that year.

=== International expansion ===
In July 2025, Blue Elephant opened its first international directly operated flagship store in Harajuku, Tokyo. The company later opened a second Tokyo store in Shinjuku, which occupied the first three floors of the Shinjuku Cat Building and used a large LED screen on the building exterior.

That October, Blue Elephant opened a pop-up store on the ground floor of Glorietta 3 in Makati, Philippines.

Two months later, Blue Elephant announced plans to open its first United States store in Beverly Hills, California. The planned store was described as a two-storey, approximately 12,000-square-foot flagship location on Beverly Drive, intended as a hub for the company's North American expansion. Maeil Business Newspaper later reported in May 2026 that Blue Elephant planned to open the Beverly Hills store the following month and apply its new "Space 2.0" retail concept there.

The brand has also entered travel retail and e-commerce channels across East Asia. Blue Elephant has been listed on Starlux Airlines' duty-free platform, Hong Kong International Airport's eShop, Sogo Hong Kong's eStore and the New Yaohan department store in Macau since 2025.

== Products and pricing ==
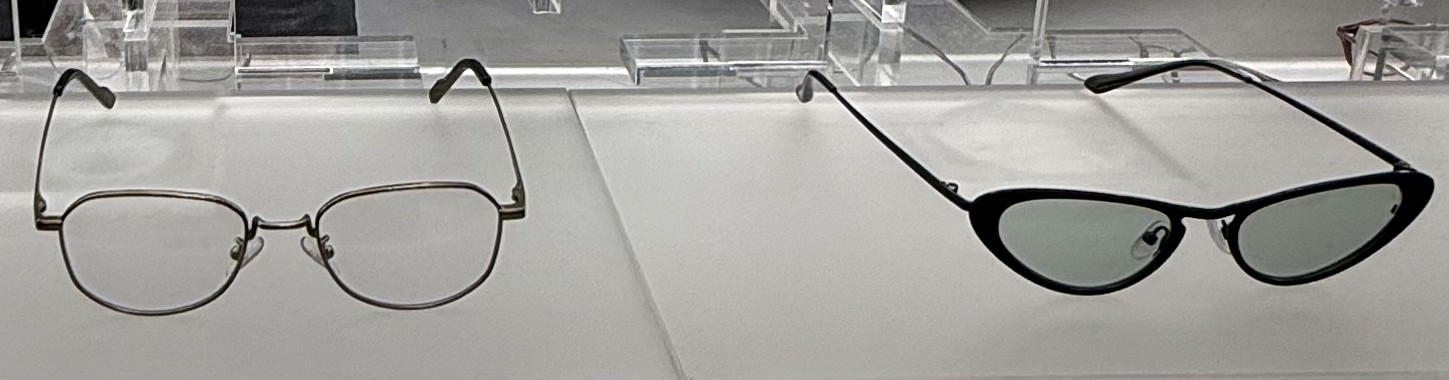
Blue Elephant's Zayo aviator-style glasses (left) and Limia Black sunglasses (right), both part of the Exclusive line, on display at the Seongsu-dong flagship store

Blue Elephant sells eyeglasses and sunglasses. The brand offered products in the ₩49,900–69,900 range (US$33.30–46.60).

In 2026, the company introduced three product lines named Basic, Exclusive and Active as part of a rebranding strategy. The Basic line was priced at ₩49,900 ($33.30), the Exclusive line at ₩69,900 ($46.60), and the Active line consisted of sports and outdoor-oriented lifestyle eyewear.

== Marketing and brand positioning ==
Blue Elephant has been associated with lower-priced Korean fashion eyewear. The brand draws on 1970s American classic and vintage references and offering eyewear at lower prices than many designer eyewear brands. Korean trade coverage has described the company's retail strategy as focused on store design, customer experience and locations with heavy tourist foot traffic.

Blue Elephant has used experiential retail as part of its marketing strategy. Blue Elephant has used the name "Space" for some of its larger experiential stores. In November 2025, the company opened Blue Elephant Space Seongsu, a large flagship store in Seongsu-dong, Seoul, with a floor area of about 35,600 square feet (3,310 m^{2}). The store includes a 12-metre (39 ft) spherical media-art installation running from the first to third floors, about 700 eyewear products, a café and a rooftop space. The store also introduced store-exclusive Seoul Edition products.

In 2026, Blue Elephant introduced "Space 2.0" as part of its wider retail strategy. The company described the strategy as changing stores from simple sales spaces into experience spaces where customers "encounter the brand's identity". According to Sports Hankook, Space 2.0 avoided the usual art objects or decorative elements found in fashion stores and instead used architectural structures to direct attention toward its products and customers. The concept was built around three keywords: tunnel, structure, and scene. In this setup, the tunnel marked the entry into the brand space, the structure guided movement and displayed products, and the scene was a separate area where customers tried on eyewear and take photos. The concept began with the Haeundae store in Busan December 2025 and was later applied to stores in Gwangalli Beach, Seo-myeon, and Gwangbok in Busan, and Aewol in Jeju. The company also planned to apply the Space 2.0 concept to future stores in Jeju City and Beverly Hills, Los Angeles, with Blue Elephant planning to apply the Space 2.0 to its Beverly Hills store while keeping the area's classical architectural character.

The company has also used seasonal installations and events at Space Seongsu. In December 2025, Blue Elephant presented Christmas-themed media art at the store. The space has also been used for exhibitions, pop-ups, brand collaborations and seasonal cultural content, in addition to eyewear retail.

Blue Elephant has also promoted its products through sponsored social media deals with K-pop artists including J-Hope of BTS and Soobin of Tomorrow X Together. Blue Elephant products have also been worn by several entertainers, including Bae Suzy, DK of Seventeen, Gaeul of Ive, Haechan of NCT, and Seulgi of Red Velvet.

Maeil Business Newspaper reported that the company had 19 employees in design-related teams, including visual creative, product design and space design teams.

== Financial performance ==
Blue Elephant recorded rapid revenue growth after 2022. The company grew from about ₩1 billion ($775,000) in sales in 2022 to more than ₩30 billion ($22 million) in 2024. The National Information & Credit Evaluation listed Blue Elephant's sales as approximately ₩999 million ($773,000) in 2022, ₩5.76 billion ($4.4 million) in 2023, ₩30.02 billion ($22 million) in 2024 and ₩50.69 billion ($35.7 million) in 2025.

== Legal issues ==
In December 2025, Gentle Monster operator II Combined took legal action against Blue Elephant, alleging that Blue Elephant copied some of its products and store designs. In March 2026, South Korean prosecutors arrested and charged Blue Elephant's former chief executive, identified in reports by surname Choi, over allegations involving the import and sale of products that copied Gentle Monster designs. Blue Elephant appointed Yoo In-cheol, its chief financial officer, and Ko Kyung-min, its chief legal officer, as co-representative directors after the former chief executive resigned.

== See also ==
- Oliver Goldsmith
- Persol
- Ray-Ban
- Warby Parker
