= Glorietta =

Shopping mall complex in the Philippines

Glorietta by Ayala Malls

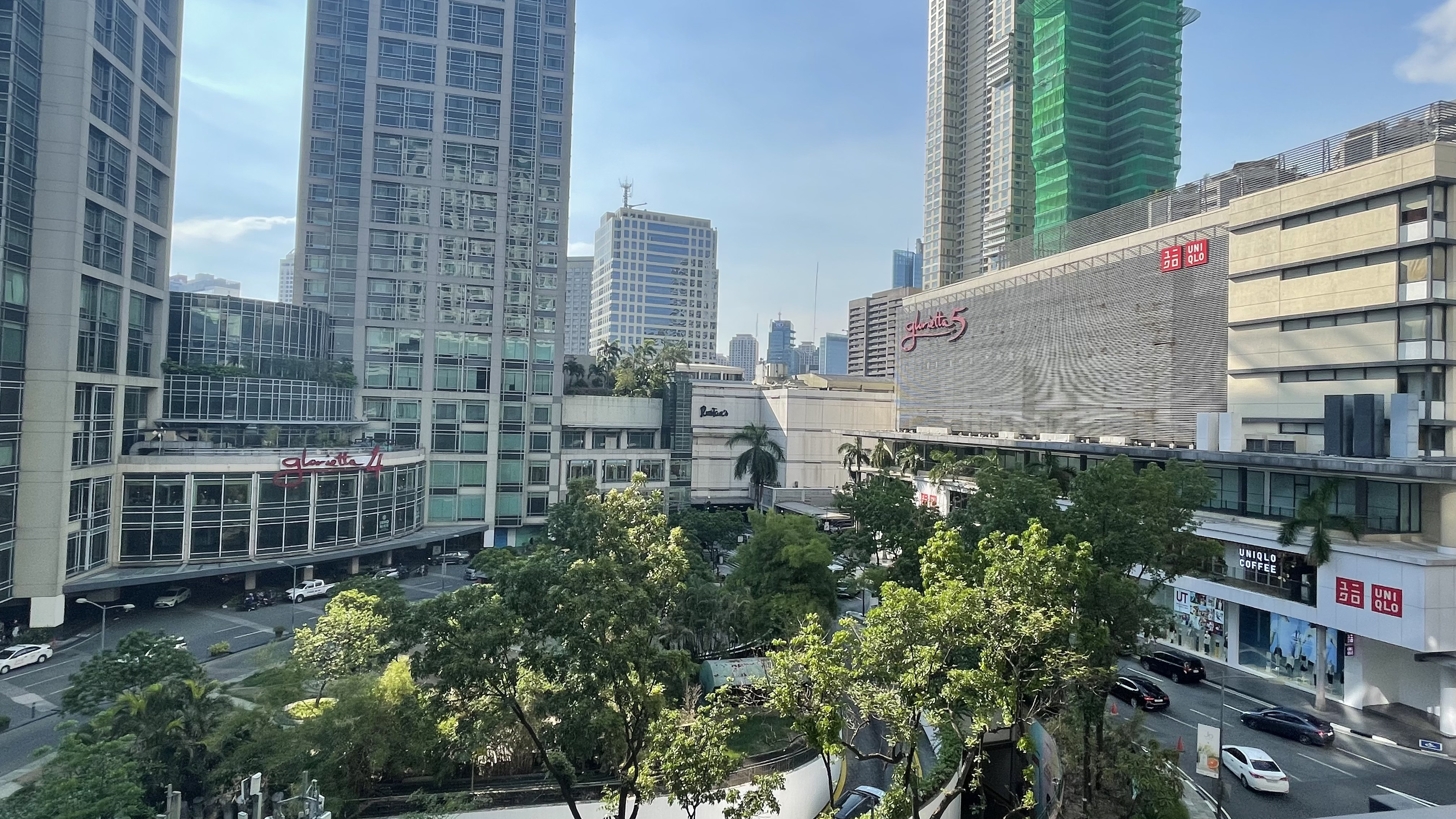
- Glorietta 4 (left) and Glorietta 5 (right), with Dolphin Park at the center, in 2024. Shown at the middle is Rustan's building.
- Location: Ayala Center, Makati, Metro Manila, Philippines
- Coordinates: 14°33′04″N 121°01′31″E
- Opened: 1991; 35 years ago
- Previous names: Quad (until 1997); Ayala Grand Mall
- Developer: Ayala Land
- Manager: Mall: Ayala Malls; Glorietta 5 BPO: Ayala Land Offices
- Owner: Ayala Land
- Architect: Ildefonso P. Santos Jr. (original mall); Hellmuth, Obata + Kassabaum, The Architects' Collaborative, E. L. Mariano F. B. Mariano and Associates (1990s redevelopment); Buchan (2024 redesign)
- Num. of stores: 550+
- Num. of anchor tenants: 5
- Floor area: 250,000 m^{2} (2,700,000 sq ft)
- Floors: Glorietta 1 & 2: 4 upper (Note: Excludes Glorietta 1 Corporate Center and Glorietta 2 Corporate Center) + 2 basement; Glorietta 3: 3 upper + 1 basement; Glorietta 4: 5 upper (Note: Excludes Ascott Makati) + 3 basement; Glorietta 5: 8 upper (Note: Includes the BPO offices at Glorietta 5) + 2 basement (Note: Includes the BPO offices parking)
- Public transit: Ayala; E Ayala One Ayala: 10 11 12 38 40 42 45 46 59; Glorietta: 10 12 17 38 40 42 45 46; L16 Glorietta
- Website: Glorietta website

Glorietta (Tagalog: [gloɾˈjɛtɐ, -ta]; stylized in all lowercase) (also known as Glorietta by Ayala Malls and formerly known as Quad and Ayala Grand Mall) is a large shopping mall complex in the Ayala Center, Makati, Metro Manila, Philippines. The mall is owned by Ayala Land and operated through its subsidiary, the Ayala Malls, while its integrated office spaces are operated by another subsidiary, the Ayala Land Offices. The mall is divided into five sections (named Glorietta 1 to 5) and contains many shops and restaurants, as well as cinemas, gyms, arcades and two central activity centers. Visitors have described the mall as maze-like, due to the complexity of its interior layout.

Glorietta 1 to 4 is integrated with the nearby Greenbelt, SM Makati, Rustan's Makati, and The Landmark. Glorietta 5 is detached, located on the former site of an open parking area between Hotel InterContinental Manila (later replaced by One Ayala) and Rustan's Makati. Coinciding with the redevelopment, the tenants affected by the October 19, 2007 explosion were given an option to relocate there.

== Name ==
The mall got its name from the Spanish word glorietta, which used to describe the public meeting place in Spanish colonial-era designed towns throughout the Philippines; the spelling with double "t" reflects the Old Spanish alphabet.

Until 1997, the mall was named Quad, a name shared with the old four-cinema shopping arcade of the same name that was integrated into the complex. The name quad is a Latin word for four, coincidentally the mall's original number of divisions. The mall was also known as Ayala Grand Mall.

== History ==
Glorietta was originally a park centrally located in the Makati Commercial Center complex. The Glorietta park, with its outdoor stage, was built in the 1970s. It was landscaped by Ildefonso P. Santos Jr., a National Artist for Architecture who was also credited for designing the entire complex. It was then surrounded by Makati Supermart, Sulô Restaurant, and small shopping arcades such as Mayfair Center, Bricktown, Lising’s Commercial, and The Quad (also known as Quad Theaters and Shopping Arcade, designed by Carlos Arguelles). In the 1980s, the Makati Supermart, alongside the Maranaw Arcade (present-day site of The Landmark), was razed by fires and the leases of nearby establishments have expired.

In 1990, Ayala decided to redevelop the Makati Commercial Center (then branded as The Center Makati) and merge it with the adjacent Greenbelt to form the Ayala Center, a rebranding that took effect in 1991. The plan called for the redevelopment of the Glorietta park and the surrounding structures into a single shopping mall.

=== As Quad ===
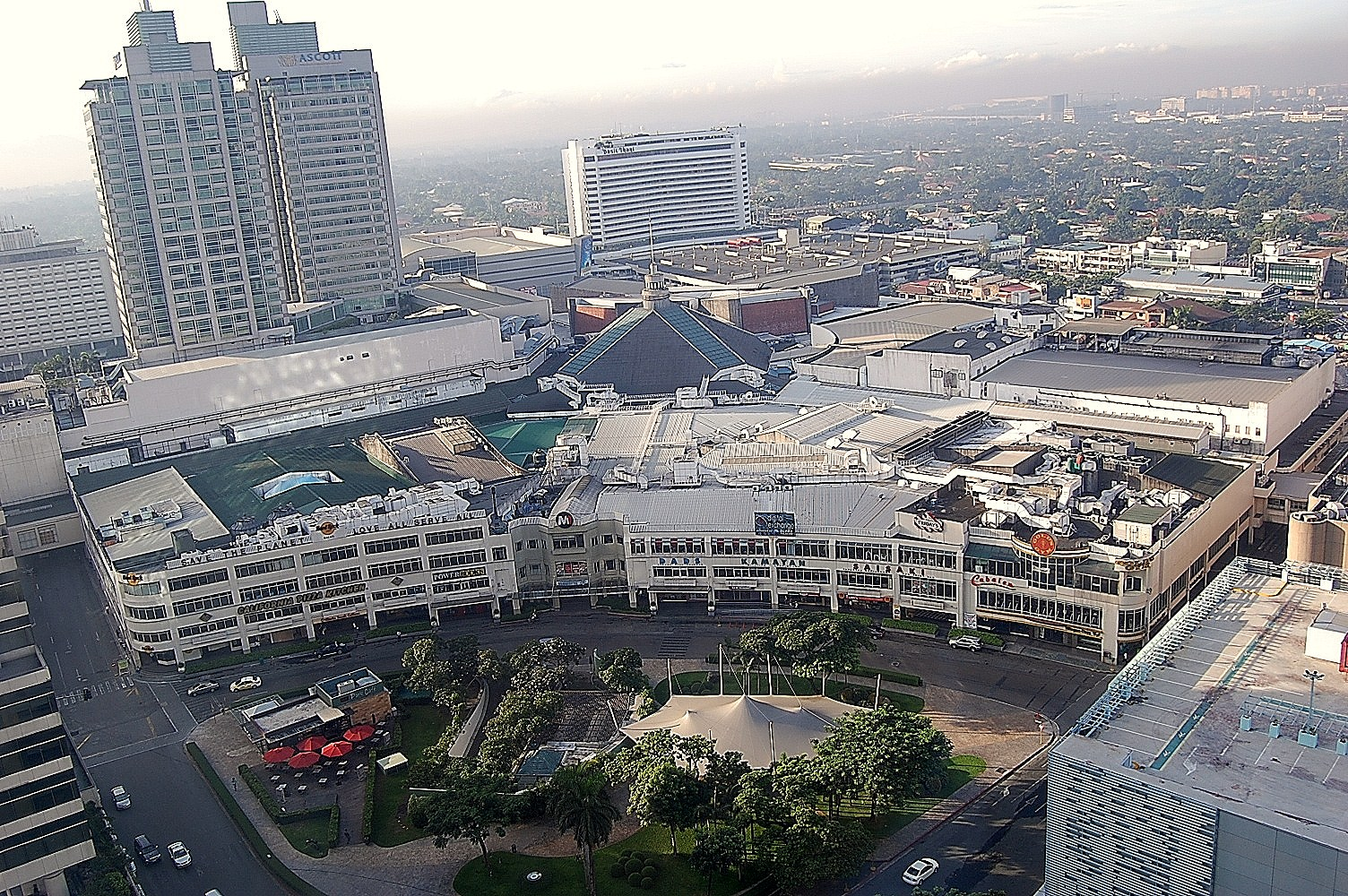
Glorietta complex in 2008

The Glorietta mall, initially known as Quad, opened in 1991 with a total gross floor area of 250,000 m^{2} (2,700,000 sq ft), envisioned as one of the largest malls in the Philippines. The mall was divided into four sections:

- Quad 1 - which retained the four original cinemas of the Quad Theaters and Shopping Arcade, from which the mall inherited its name;
- Quad 2 - which was built on the old site of the Makati Supermart and featured both the Goldcrest shopping arcade and an indoor theme park named Glico's Great Adventure;
- Quad 3 - which was built on the old site of Sulô Restaurant and would soon be the home of international restaurants like Hard Rock Cafe and TGI Friday's;
- Quad 4 - which replaced the Lising's Commercial, Bricktown, and Mayfair Center shopping arcades and slated to become a new hub for entertainment. However, this section remained unopened while under the Quad name due to construction delays caused by the integration of the Oakwood Premier Ayala Center apartments (now Ascott Makati) directly above it.

Quad 1 and 2 opened in 1991 after renovation was completed in 1990, while Quad 3 opened in 1992 and was completed in September 1993. Those were divided by large, open walkways radiating from the central activity center to their namesake major roads (clockwise from north): Ayala Mall (which includes the Glorietta Grand Mall beside Rustan’s Makati), EDSA Mall, Pasay Mall, and Makati Mall. Tenants that set up shop in Ayala Center prior to the mall's development, most notably Mercury Drug, Automatic Centre, Jollibee, Max's, and McDonald's, also found a home in the mall.

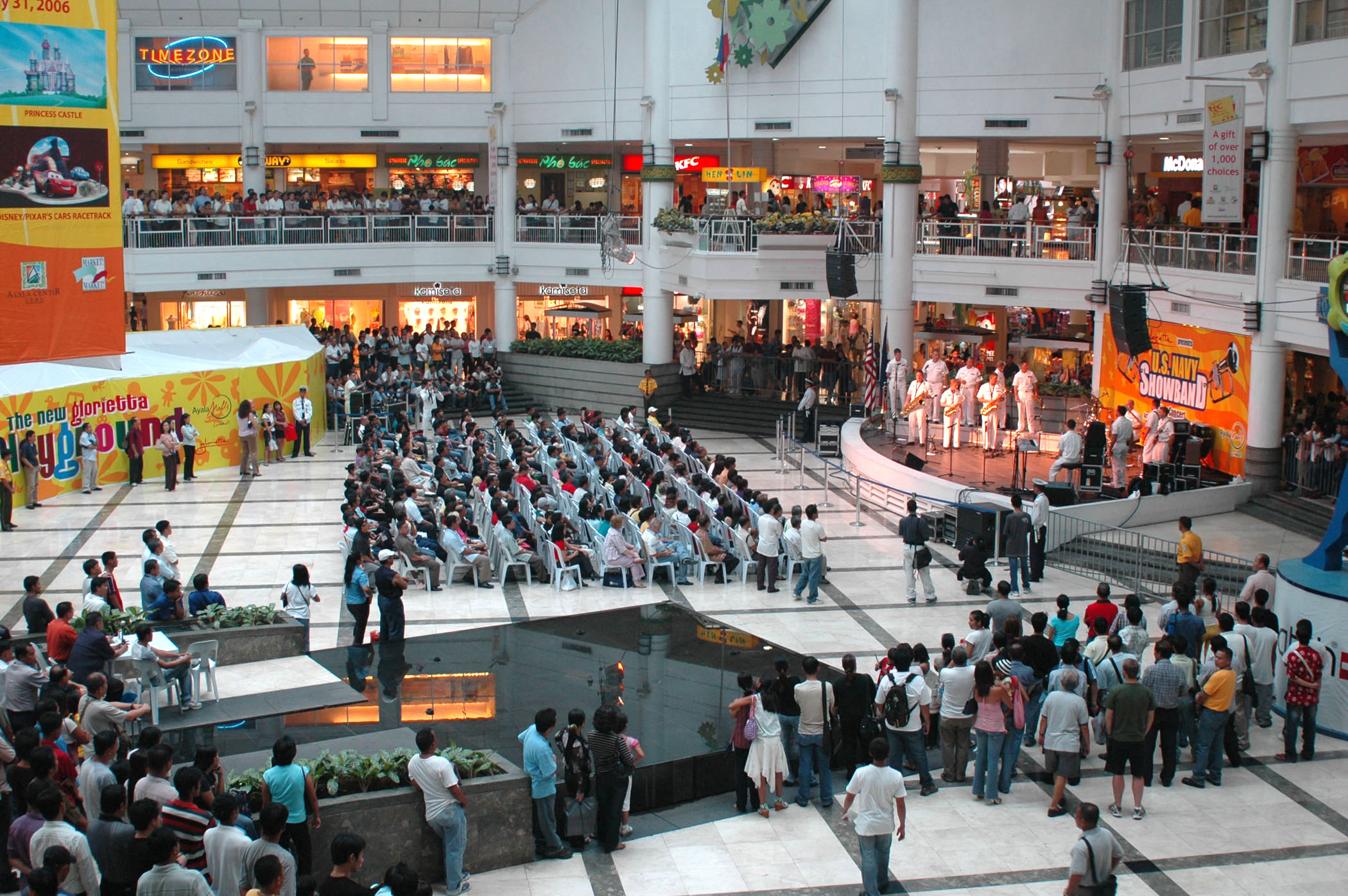
A shot of the activity center (atrium) during a US Navy band showcase event in 2006. The Wet Design fountain can be seen in the bottom left.

In the mid-1990s, Quad emerged as a premier mall, boasting an air-conditioned atrium, children's playground, and activity center. A fountain located in the activity center, designed by WET Design, completed in August 1993 was known to shoot a jet of water to nearly the height of the 190-foot (58 m) ceiling.

=== As Glorietta ===
In 1997, Quad was rebranded as Glorietta. Glorietta 4 finally opened in 1998 and was completed in 1999, the same year as the debut of Oakwood Premier, whose construction had delayed this section's opening. The department stores surrounding the mall – SM Makati, The Landmark, and Rustan's – were utilized as its anchor tenants for both its supermarkets and department stores.

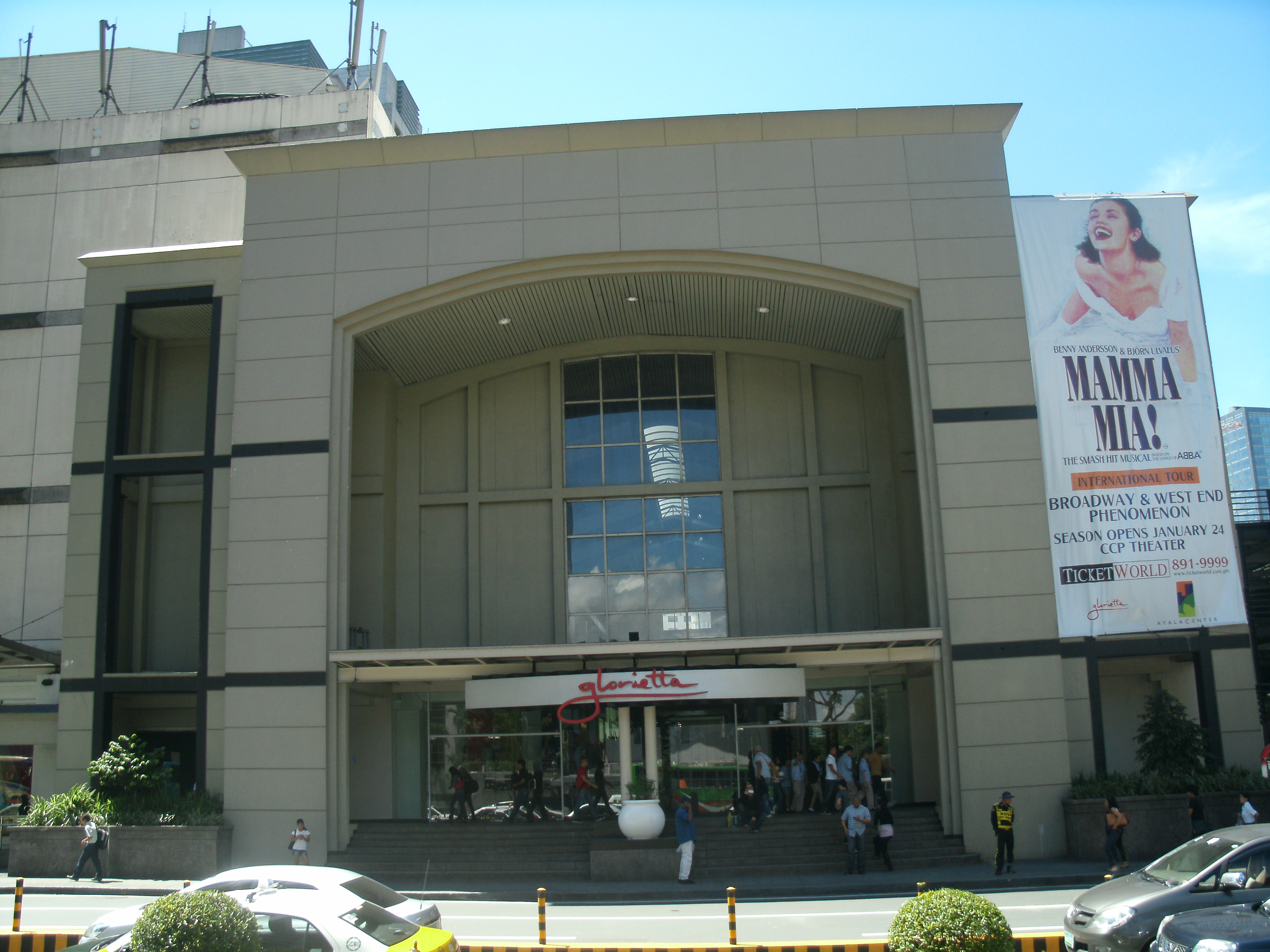
Glorietta Grand Mall entrance in 2012

The mall underwent expansions from 1999 to 2005. Glorietta 5, an additional wing detached from Glorietta 1 to 4, was opened in 2008. As part of the Ayala Center Redevelopment, Glorietta 1 and 2 were demolished in 2010 for reconstruction that concluded with reopening on November 5 and December 7, 2012, respectively, followed by the addition of Holiday Inn & Suites Makati (opened in 2013) and two namesake office towers on top of the reconstructed mall. On November 29, 2012, Move to the Vibe of Glorietta, a fashion show, was held at the mall's new Palm Drive Activity Center and broke the Guinness World Record for the “Most People Modeling on a Catwalk” with 2,255 participants. It held the record until July 4, 2015, when it was surpassed by Culture Liverpool's 3,651 participants.

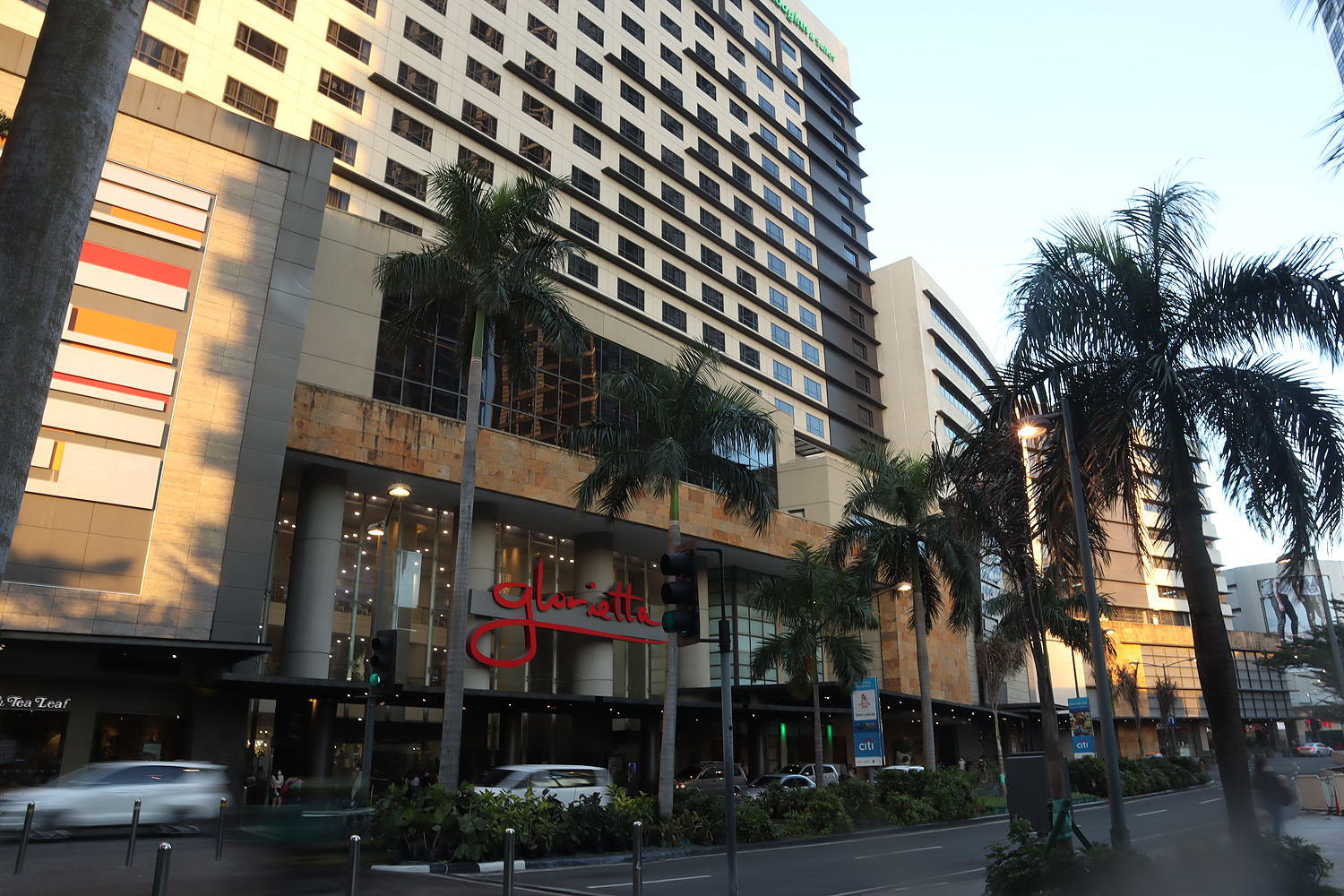
The rebuilt Glorietta 1 & 2 was opened in 2012

A Chuck E. Cheese's was meant to open here in 2013, but the plans were cancelled due to the mall layout. Further developments followed, including the opening of Uniqlo's flagship and largest Southeast Asian store at Glorietta 5 in 2018, the unveiling of "Top of the Glo" roof deck in 2019, and the completed renovation of Food Choices in Glorietta 4 and of the atrium in the same year. The renovation on the mall's fitness and wellness zones was completed in 2021, with the launch of Wellness Place and the opening of the country's largest Adidas store.

==== 2020s redevelopment ====
A major redevelopment of Glorietta is being done in phases since the first quarter of 2024. It features layout changes, along with new interiors and exteriors and additional open-air areas, and increase its gross leasable area (GLA) by 10 percent. It is expected to be completed in 2026. Ayala Malls has tapped Australian architectural firm Buchan for the redesign of Glorietta.

As part of the renovation, the total number of cinema theaters at Glorietta was reduced from seven to six. The original Cinema 3 was dismantled to make way for Mettacity, an immersive entertainment hub that opened on February 11, 2026, while the original Cinemas 4 to 7 were renumbered as the new Cinemas 3 to 6. The new Cinema 3 opened on August 20, 2025, as an A-Luxe Cinema, followed by the opening of Cinema 5 in 2026 as an A-Giant Cinema. A 300-square-meter (3,200 sq ft) 13K-resolution LED display, one of the largest in the Philippines, was unveiled in mid-2025 at the cinema lobby. Meanwhile, Dolphin Park is being redeveloped as Glorietta Plaza. On April 1, 2026, Food Choices was closed for renovation and rebranding as the Troopers food hall.

== Features ==
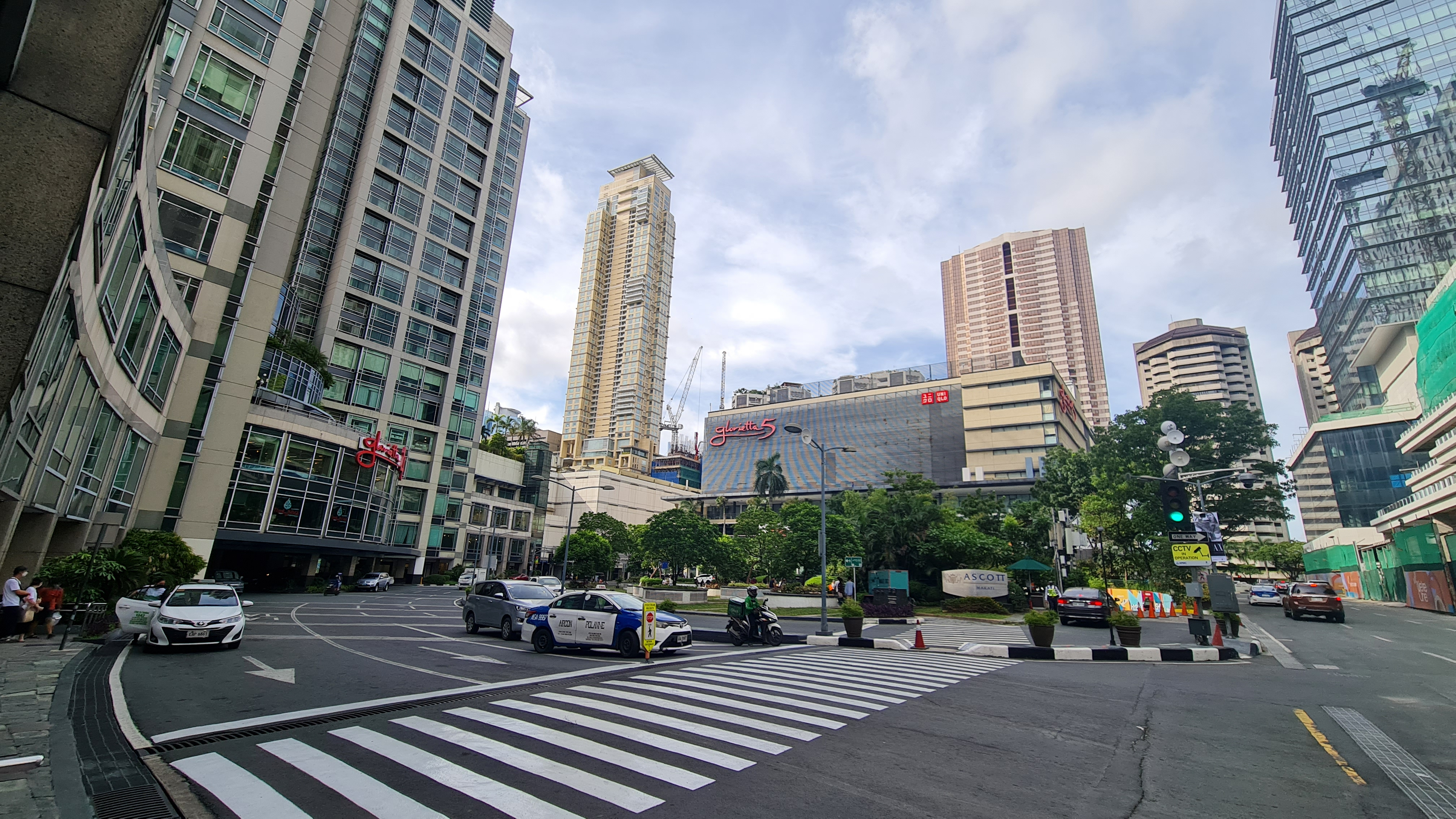
Glorietta 4 & 5 with One Ayala on the right during daytime (2022)

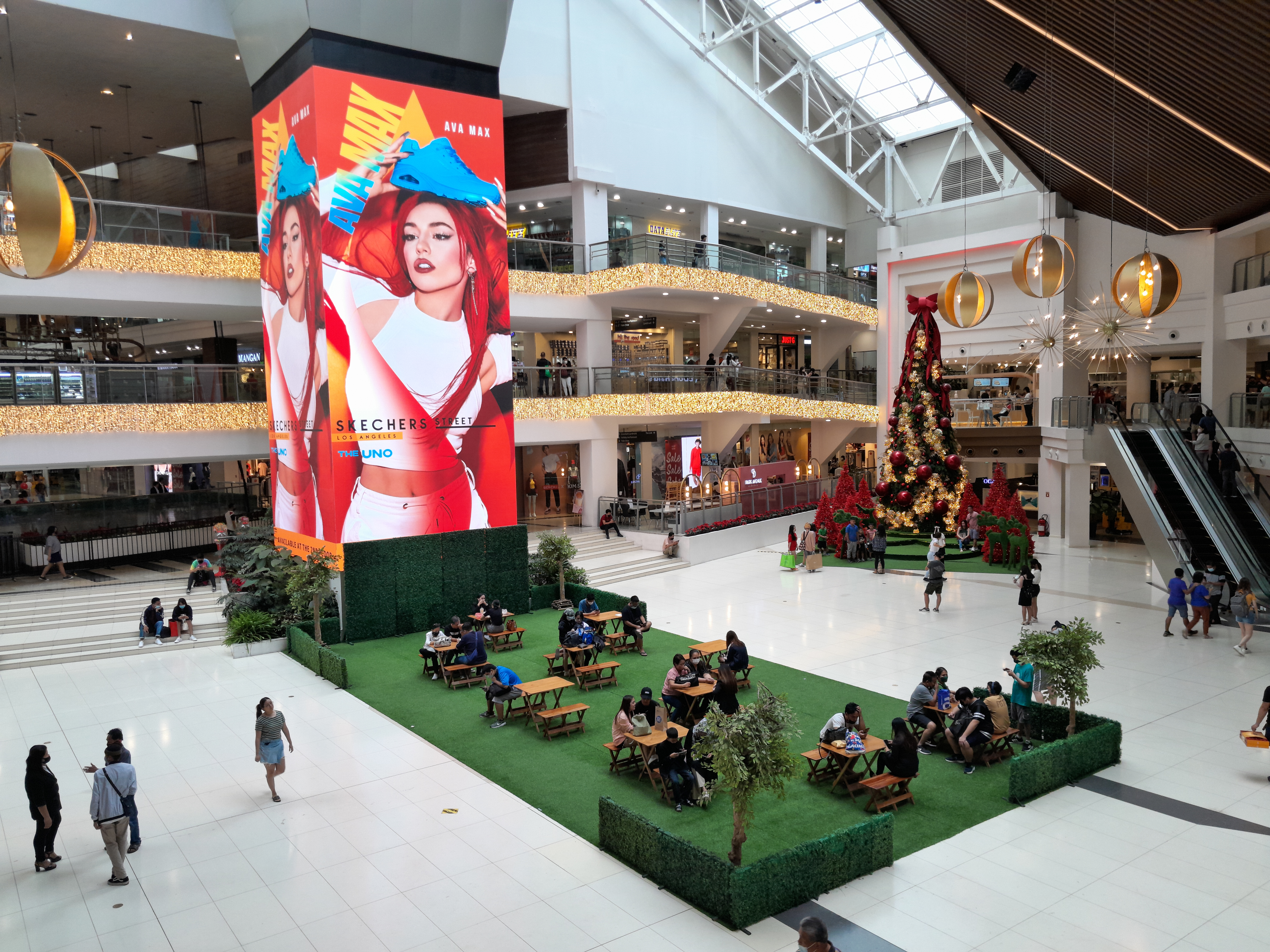
Atrium

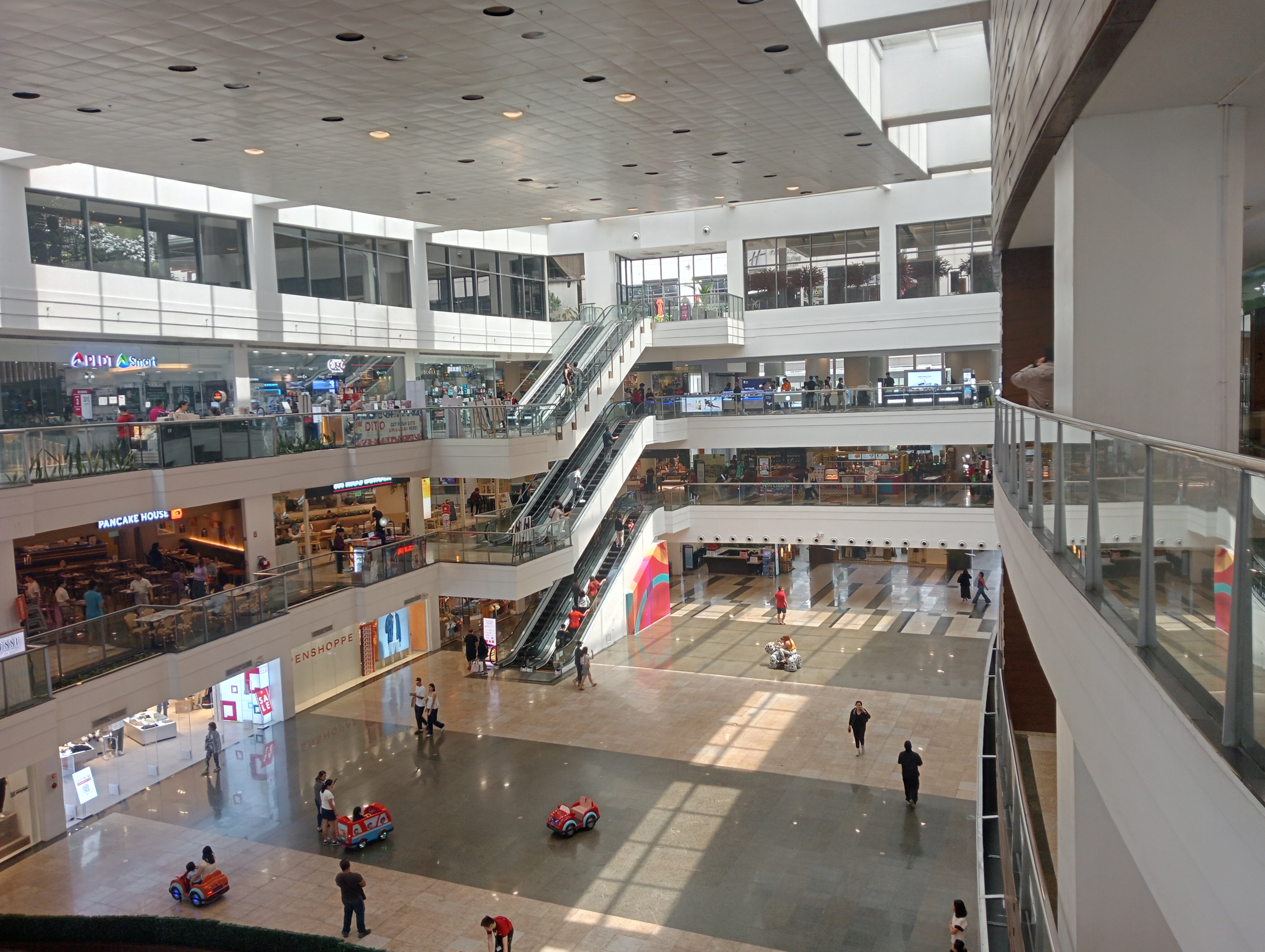
Palm Drive Activity Center

Activity centers of Glorietta

Glorietta, located in Ayala Center, has a total Gross Floor Area of 250,000 m^{2} (2,700,000 sq ft), making it the thirteenth largest shopping mall in the Philippines in terms of GFA, tied with Greenbelt. It is divided into five sections: the contiguous Glorietta 1, 2, 3, and 4, and the fully detached Glorietta 5. Glorietta 1 to 4 features up to five levels of retail. Located in the contiguous area is the Glorietta Grand Mall, a hallway that is shared with the adjacent Rustan's building, with an entrance along Ayala Avenue. Glorietta 5 has three retail levels and five levels of BPO offices. Though detached above ground, it is connected to the rest of Glorietta via a basement pedestrian walkway. Level 2 walkways link Glorietta to SM Makati and The Landmark, respectively, and a Level 3 walkway links Glorietta 5 to One Ayala and eventually to Rustan's. Previous links to the former Park Square 1 and Park Square 2 existed before the 2010–12 redevelopment. Adjacent parks are Glorietta Park (formerly Glorietta 3 Park), Glorietta Plaza (formerly known as Glorietta 4 Park and Dolphin Park), Palm Promenade, and Terraces Square.

Glorietta 3 is home to clubs and restaurants (including Hard Rock Cafe), international luxury labels, and the Wellness Place. Glorietta 4 is home to six cinema theaters (including an A-Luxe cinema and an A-Giant cinema), the extension of Rustan's Department Store from the Rustan's building, The Marketplace supermarket (formerly Rustan's Supermarket and The Marketplace by Rustan's; located within the Rustan's building but considered part of Glorietta), and the Troopers food hall (formerly Food Choices). Glorietta 5 is home to Uniqlo's largest Southeast Asian branch and Christ's Commission Fellowship (CCF) Makati.

"Top of the Glo" is an al fresco roof deck attraction featuring Japan Town), K-Park, and the Omniverse Museum at Level 4 of Glorietta 1 and 2. Its retail area has a GLA of 2,500 square meters (27,000 sq ft). An atrium is situated at the center of the contiguous Glorietta, as well as an activity center in between Glorietta 1 and 2, facing the Palm Drive entrance. Both spaces are frequently utilized for hosting events.

=== Hotels and office buildings ===
Ascott Makati above Glorietta 4, in 2008

Above the contiguous Glorietta stand office buildings such as Glorietta 1 Corporate Center and Glorietta 2 Corporate Center, as well as hotels such as Holiday Inn & Suites Makati and Ascott Makati (formerly Oakwood Premier Ayala Center until 2006). Those buildings are all accessible at Glorietta's ground level, with Holiday Inn & Suites Makati accessible through Level 4 as well.

=== Parking ===
Glorietta is supported by three levels of basement parking shared with the aforementioned hotels, interconnected with the basement parking of the adjacent Park Terraces residential complex and Terraces Square. It is also served by other distinct parking facilities nearby, such as The Link, 6750 Steel Parking (under redevelopment since 2025), 6750 Ayala Avenue Office Tower, Park Square, and One Ayala's basement parking, which is planned for connection to Glorietta's.

=== Gallery ===
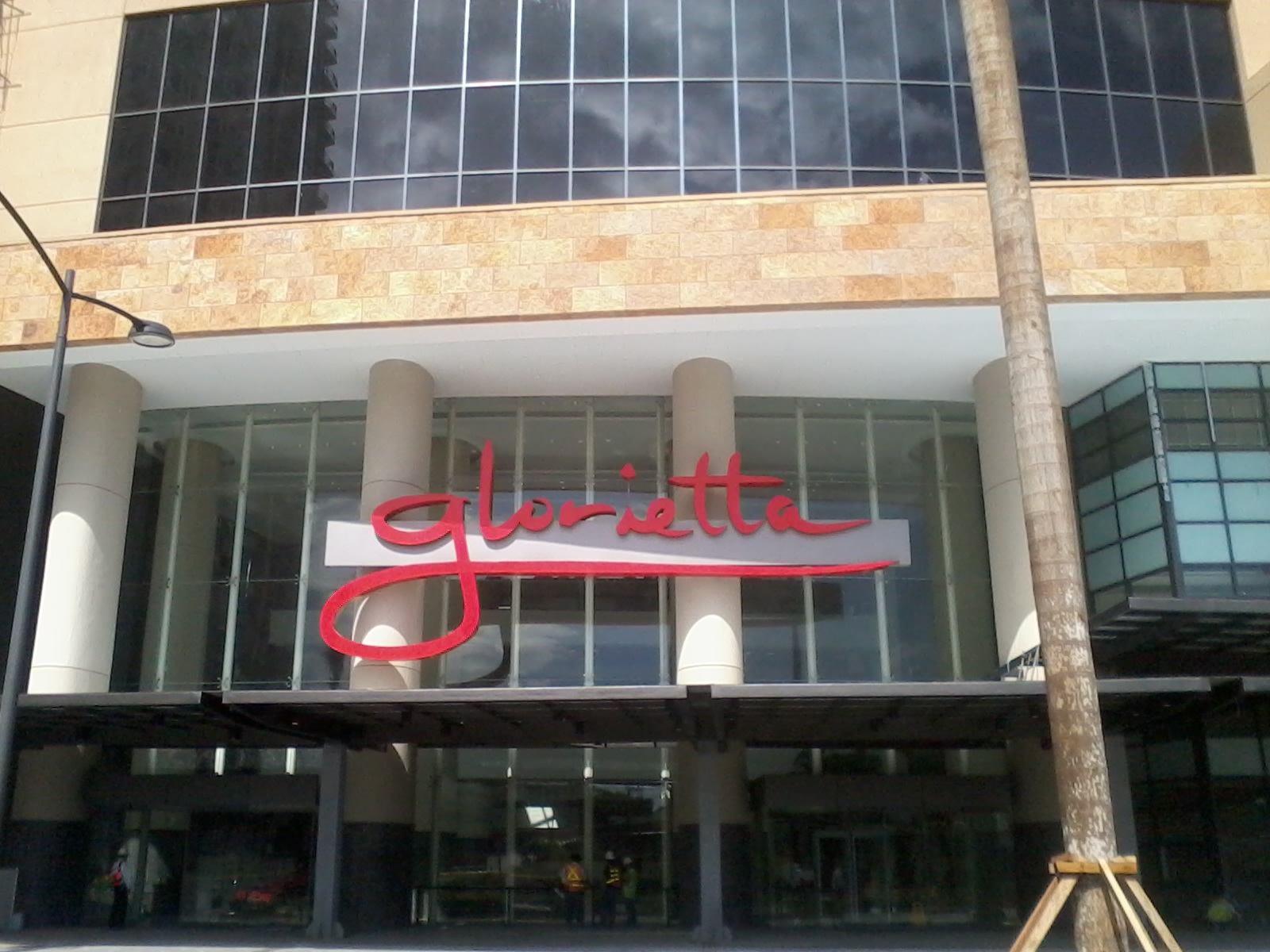
The facade of the rebuilt Glorietta 1 & 2 along Palm Drive

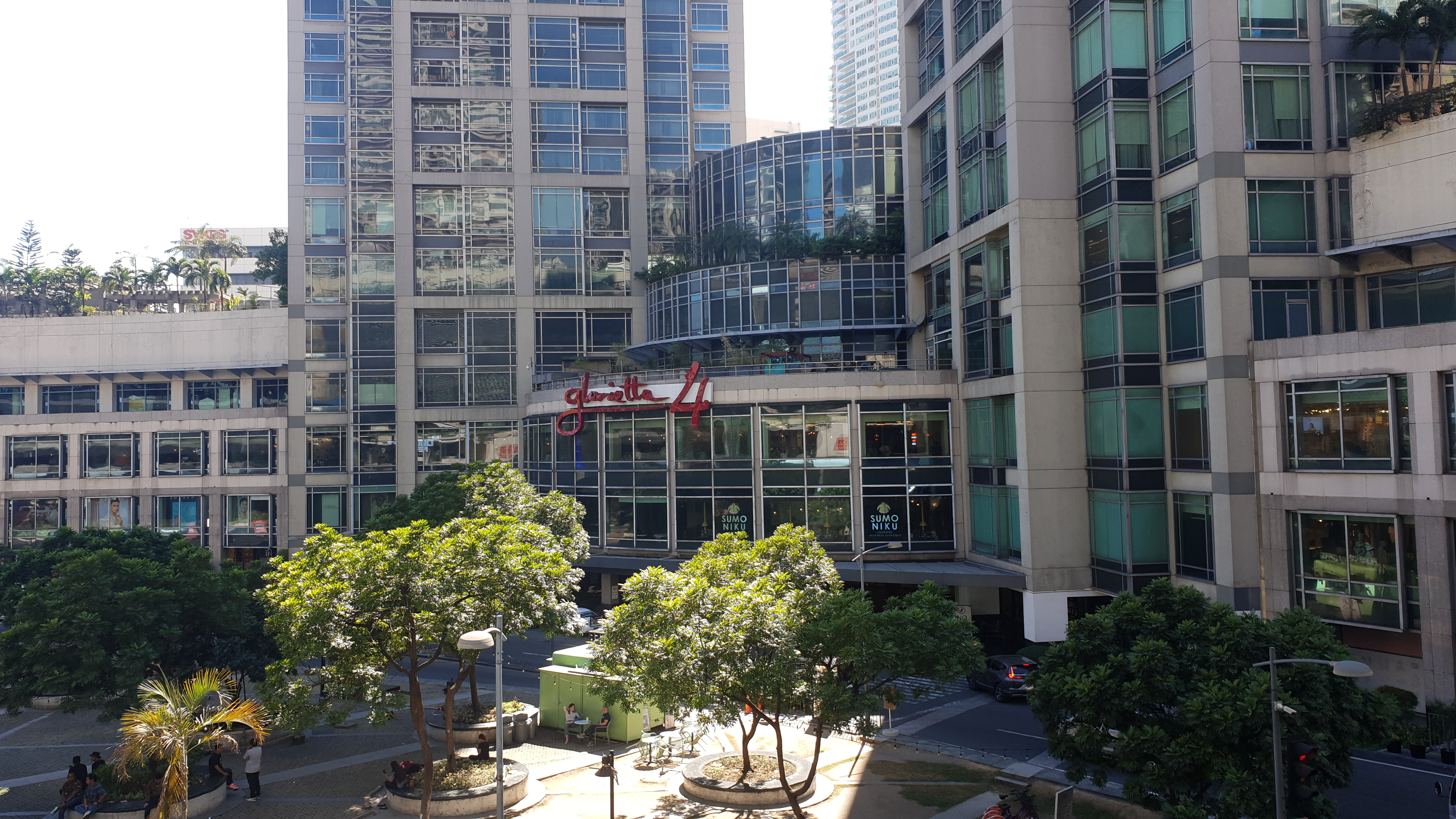
Glorietta 4

Glorietta 5

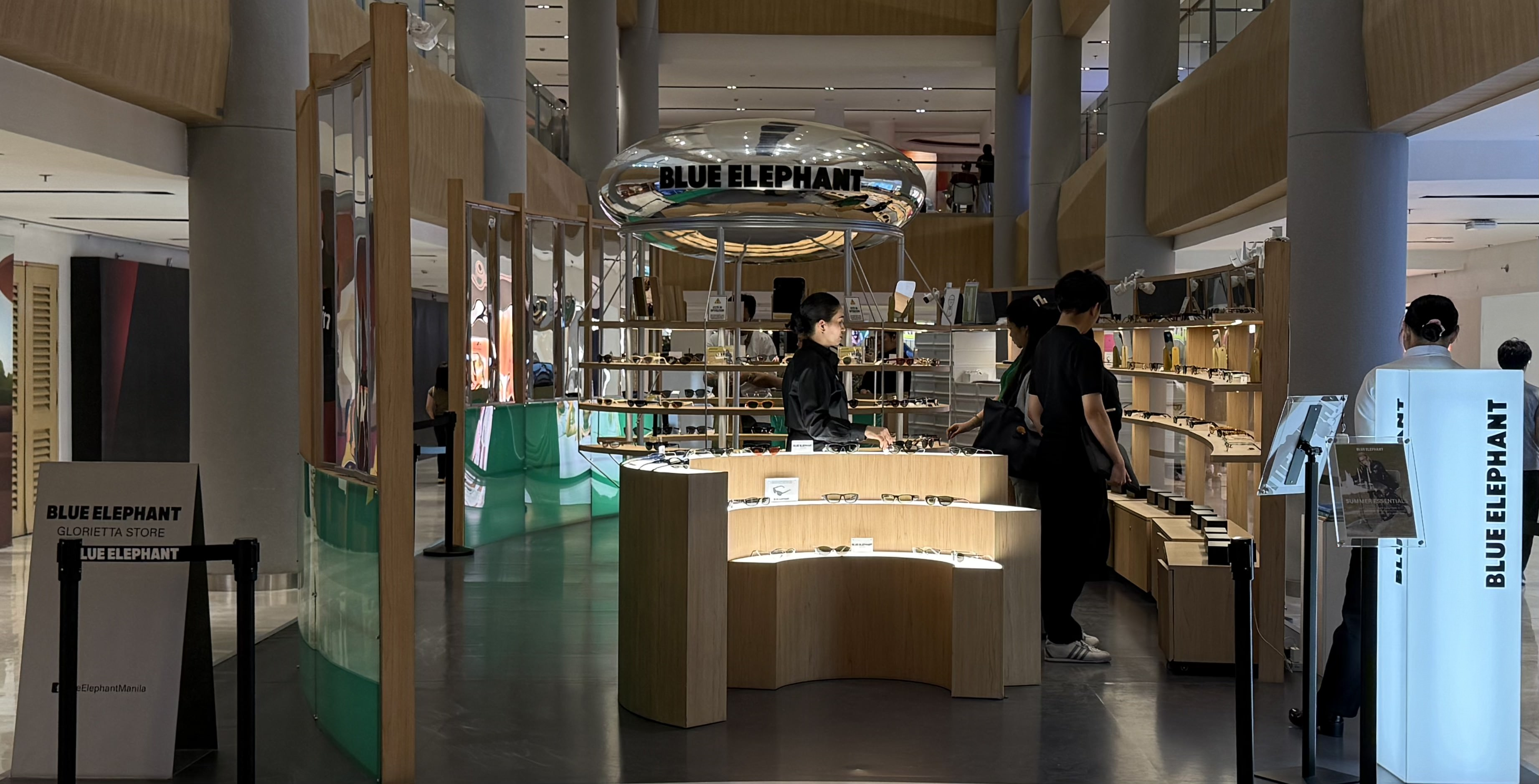
Blue Elephant pop-up store at Glorietta 3

== Incidents and accidents ==
=== 2000 bombing ===
On May 17, 2000, shortly before 5:00 p.m. PHT, a blast occurred along the pedestrian bridge between Glorietta 2 and Park Square 2. It left thirteen (13) people injured. Police said the blast (by a homemade explosive) originated from a restroom of a restaurant and affected a nearby branch of Timezone. Two rival gangs were seen fighting near the restaurant shortly before the blast occurred.

=== Oakwood mutiny ===
Magdalo soldiers led by Lt. Sr. Grade Antonio Trillanes IV took control of the Oakwood Premier on July 27, 2003. Glorietta, where the hotel stood, was also closed during the siege.

=== 2007 explosion ===
An explosion in Glorietta 2 on October 19, 2007, killed eleven people and injured a hundred others. Initially, authorities termed it a liquefied petroleum gas explosion at Luk Yuen Noodle House, but later began investigating the possibility that the explosion may have been a C-4 bomb. The explosion destroyed much of Glorietta 2's main lobby and vehicles parked outside. Several days later, October 23, 2007, senior government officials expressed "a high level of certainty" that the explosion was an accident, but the bomb theory has not been totally ruled out. This was brought on by the inability of experts to find bomb components after four days of rigorous investigation. It is believed that the explosion was caused by underground structures in the mall that might have triggered the blast, pending further investigation.

Following the explosion, the mall was temporarily closed, but Glorietta 1, 3, and 4 were reopened on October 25, 2007.

=== Fire incidents ===
- October 21, 2007: A fire broke out at noon PHT (GMT+8) in the kitchen of one of the restaurants in Glorietta 4, which was unaffected by the explosion two days earlier. It was put out by firemen an hour later.
- November 20, 2016: At around 8 in the evening PHT, a fire struck a restaurant in Glorietta 3 right above the Gold's Gym branch, without injuries or casualties.
- April 10, 2017: A minor fire broke out at the Glorietta 2 roof deck past 6:00pm. A fire out was declared less than 25 minutes later. There were no reported injuries.
- May 19, 2019: A minor fire incident occurred at a milk tea shop being renovated at Glorietta 2 at between 5:59pm and 6:20pm PST. Bureau of Fire Protection declared a fire out at 6:31pm. The incident left one injured.

=== Other incidents ===
- On July 16, 2014, the façade of Glorietta 5 was damaged by winds brought about by Typhoon Rammasun (Glenda).
- On January 3, 2016, past midnight, a call center agent from Sykes Philippines fell to his death from the 10th level of the Glorietta 1 Corporate Center, where the company is located. His body was later found on the building's roof deck at the 4th level at 1:20am, according to police.

== See also ==
- List of largest shopping malls
- List of largest shopping malls in the Philippines
- List of shopping malls in Metro Manila
