= Minnesota nice =

Cultural stereotype applied to Minnesotans

Minnesota nice is a cultural stereotype applied to the behavior of people from the U.S. state of Minnesota, implying residents are unusually courteous, reserved, and mild-mannered compared to people from other states. The phrase also implies polite friendliness, an aversion to open confrontation, a tendency toward understatement, a disinclination to make a direct fuss or stand out, apparent emotional restraint, and self-deprecation. It is sometimes associated with passive-aggression.

== Social norms ==
Playwright and corporate communications consultant Syl Jones suggested that Minnesota nice is not so much about being "nice" but is more about keeping up appearances, maintaining the social order, and keeping people (including non-natives of the state) in their place. He relates these social norms to the literary work of Danish-Norwegian novelist Aksel Sandemose, the fictional Law of Jante, and more generally, Scandinavian culture. Garrison Keillor's A Prairie Home Companion discusses "Wobegonics", the supposed language of Minnesotans, which includes "no confrontational verbs or statements of strong personal preference".

== Examples ==
The generosity of state citizens has been commented on; the heavily reported influenza vaccine shortage of late 2004 did not strike the state as hard as elsewhere since many people willingly gave up injections for others. The concept has also received some support from the academic community; a national study by Peter Rentfrow, Samuel D. Gosling, and Jeff Potter done in 2008 found that Minnesota was the second most agreeable and fifth most extraverted state in the nation, traits associated with "nice".

Since the 1960s and 1970s and continuing into the present, Minnesota has been a leading state in refugee resettlement; this can be linked to the traditions of progressivism and generosity associated with Minnesota nice. Various groups, especially Hmong from Laos and Somalis, as well as large numbers of Vietnamese, Burmese, Ethiopians, Laotians, Tibetans, and Liberians, have found homes in the state, particularly in the Twin Cities. Since 2002, Minnesota has been home to the largest population of Somalis in North America.

Minnesota nice was an influence on the Coen brothers movie Fargo, set in both Minnesota and neighboring North Dakota, and a 2015 review of the Fargo TV series described the Minnesota nice attitude as providing a form of cover for some of the show's "darker, more venal" characters. A 2003 documentary about the making of the movie was entitled Minnesota Nice.

== Criticism ==
History professor Annette Atkins suggests that the concept is a marketing myth, emerging from the work of Howard Mohr and Garrison Keillor in the 1980s. These authors may have created the myth in order to make Minnesota distinctive from neighboring states like Iowa.

Journalist and Minnesota native Michele Norris argued the phrase had acquired "undertones of irony and despair" following the 2020 murder of George Floyd in Minneapolis.

== See also ==
- Agreeableness
- Beverly Hills 90210 (TV show with Minnesota Nice tropes)
- Fargo (movie with Minnesota Nice tropes)
- Iowa nice
- Seattle Freeze
- Southern hospitality
