= Seattle Freeze =

Social phenomenon in Seattle, Washington

The Seattle Freeze is, according to widely held belief, a difficulty with making new friends in the American city of Seattle, Washington, particularly for transplants from other areas. A 2005 article in The Seattle Times written by Julia Sommerfeld appears to be the first known use of the term, although the phenomenon was documented during rapid population increases in the early 1920s, World War II, and the 1980s. The phenomenon is sometimes found or associated with Portland, Oregon; Vancouver, Canada; or other cities in the Pacific Northwest as well.

== Key traits ==
Newcomers to the area have described Seattleites as socioculturally apathetic, standoffish, cold, distant, and distrustful. People from Seattle tend to mainly interact with their particular clique in social settings such as bars and parties. One author said of the aversion to strangers that "people are very polite but not particularly friendly", while some residents dispute any existence of the Seattle Freeze altogether.

== History ==
Speculation of the origin is the reserved personalities of the city's early Nordic and Asian immigrants, the emotional effects of the climate (such as Seasonal Affective Disorder), or the region's history of independent-minded pioneers.

The Seattle Times reported in April 1920: “Seattle people have been accused of being too cold and distant.” The Seattle Daily Times described similar characteristics as early as the 1940s. Seattle experienced an influx of new residents from California beginning in the 1980s, and a 2005 article in The Seattle Times appears to be the first known use of the term.

A 2008 peer-reviewed study published in Perspectives on Psychological Science found that among all 50 states and the District of Columbia, Washington residents ranked 48th in the personality trait extraversion. In 2014, a report by a local nonprofit organization ranked the population 48th out of 50 similarly sized cities in "talking with neighbors frequently", and 37th for "giving or receiving favors". The rapid growth of Amazon and its accompanying influx of technology workers who could be considered more introverted than other working professionals may have exacerbated the issue. A 2019 nonscientific poll conducted by Seattle-based PEMCO Insurance found that about 40% of the 1,200 respondents in Washington and Oregon said making new friends was not important. In a similar 2022 poll, about two-thirds of residents agreed, at least somewhat, that giving newcomers the "cold shoulder" was a typical trait from those in the Pacific Northwest.

The Seattle Freeze was discussed in relation to isolation experienced during COVID-19 pandemic-related lockdowns due to the region's already engrained propensity for "cultural distancing." However, the Director of the University of Washington's Center for the Science of Social Connection draws a distinction between solitude in lockdown, which may be experienced and dissipated collectively, versus looking in on sociality from the outside, which may be lonelier and which is the form of solitude most associated with the Seattle Freeze.

== Effects ==
According to data from the 2024 US Census survey, 43% of Washingtonians reported feeling lonely at least occasionally, one of the highest in the nation. In an early 2024 survey, half (50%) of young adults in Seattle reported feelings of loneliness. The survey also indicated that around 4 in 10 respondents reported thoughts of suicide. The Seattle Freeze has been cited as an exacerbating factor for the high rates of loneliness in Seattle and the surrounding region; along with social media, the weather and the general rise of the loneliness epidemic.

== See also ==
- Iowa nice
- Minnesota nice
- Seattle process
- Southern hospitality
