= Seattle process =

Political process

The Seattle process or Seattle way is a term stemming from the political procedure in Seattle and King County, and to a lesser extent other cities and the Washington state government. The term has no strict definition but refers to the pervasively slow process of dialogue, deliberation, participation, and municipal introspection before making any decision and the time it takes to enact any policy. An early definition came from a 1983 editorial in the Seattle Weekly, "the usual Seattle process of seeking consensus through exhaustion."

"In its positive connotation the Seattle Way values popular participation, transparent process and meaningful debate. More negatively, it has been decried as a culture that values process and debate over results, that bogs down and can't get important things done."—Mark Purcell, Recapturing Democracy.

"The Seattle Way usually is defined as circular consultation reaching indecision. But it also consists of an uninvolved electorate and public decisions taken carelessly, without regard for experience elsewhere and unmindful of consequence."—Ted Van Dyk, contributing columnist to the Seattle Post-Intelligencer

The Seattle process, and claimed devotion to it, has been an issue in political races. In the 2001 Mayoral Election candidate Greg Nickels used devotion to Seattle process as an issue against his opponent, city attorney Mark Sidran, who promised a more decisive style. However, eight years later Nickels' style as Mayor would be criticized in a re-election race as top-down, autocratic, and antithetical to the Seattle process.

== History ==
Prior to the election of Wes Uhlman as mayor in 1969, civic decision making was relatively quick and powerful groups could influence civic leaders without seeking wide consensus.

Proponents of the Seattle process, such as former city councilman Richard Conlin, praised it as a thoughtful method of generating the best results at the expense of time. In return, opponents referred to Conlin in 2005 as the "Duke of Dither" for his devotion to process.

As the Seattle process became more drawn out, it has been criticized, usually by business interests as too slow and dithering. As an example, during the massive redevelopment of the Cascade and South Lake Union neighborhoods in the early 21st century it was criticized by Vulcan Inc. and Fred Hutchinson Cancer Research Center that an in-depth discussion of all of the ideas would wear out the patience of other groups providing financial capital. Meanwhile, neighborhood activists complained that the proposed development ignored the neighborhood plans that were previously, and laboriously, developed in a consensual process. City neighborhood activists generally like the deliberative process.

The process has also been criticized for bland results.

== Affected projects ==
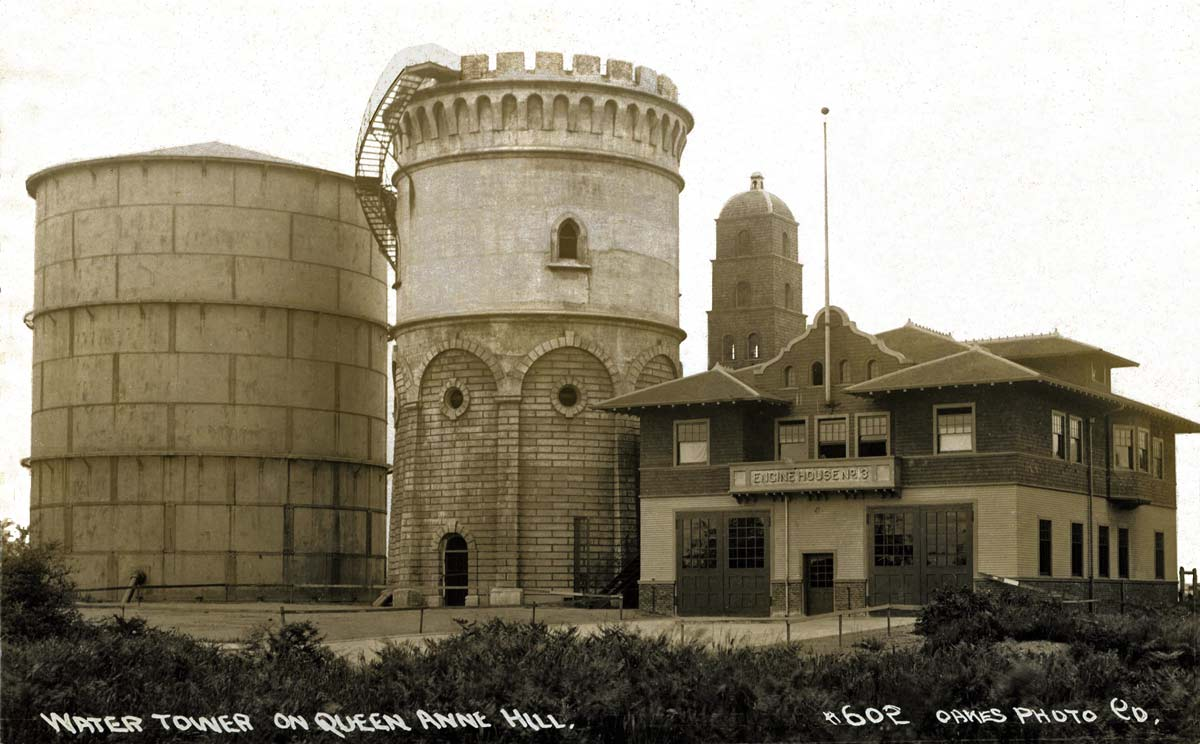
Old water towers on Queen Anne Hill, which took 14 years and almost $3 million in planning and development costs to replace

- Rebuilding Husky Stadium, doubly affected with planning for the stadium and nearby reconstruction of the Evergreen Point Floating Bridge.
- Rebuilding the Evergreen Point Floating Bridge
- Proposed replacement of the Alaskan Way Viaduct, which did not start deconstruction until 10 years after damage by the Nisqually earthquake
- Seattle Monorail Project, aborted after four public votes approving it having spent $124.7 million in taxpayer funds without beginning any monorail construction.
- Historical preservation of architecturally significant buildings
- Skate parks and relocating public art
- Sports fields in Magnuson Park
- Replacing water towers on Queen Anne Hill, a process that took 13 years and $2.7 million just in planning and development
- Delays in revitalization of Broadway, the major commercial street of the Capitol Hill Neighborhood
- Delays in the urban village expansion project at Northgate Mall
- Transformation of the Cascade neighborhood
- Canceling concerts at Gas Works Park
- Construction of a third runway at Seattle–Tacoma International Airport. The project was formally launched in 1992 and finished in 2008, during which construction costs rose from an initial estimated $217 million to $1.1 billion.
- Completion of the "missing link" of the Burke-Gilman Trail
- West Seattle and Ballard Link light rail expansion: The planning phase of the project was delayed years and incurred over $30 million in additional expenses after the Sound Transit Board voted multiple times for additional study due to community and political pushback.

== Methods ==
The Seattle process as an informal method values study, discussion and civic engagement. It will involve numerous stakeholder groups. It requires the community to present effective data, and for organizers to translate data from different constituencies into useful reports for decision makers. Using process to seek out consensus and hearing all opinions even extends to the corporate boardroom, not just government.

Methods of participation typically include council meetings, neighborhood forums, ballot measures, and marches. Stakeholder groups are all-inclusive and usually include citizens, corporations, non-profits, neighborhood representatives, and identity or issue specific groups.

Despite being called a "process" there is no definitive methodology to the Seattle process; in fact, while writing about Seattle taking four decades to build a light-rail line, The New York Times called it a "mysterious and maddening phenomenon".

Outside of the public meetings and methods open to the public, the Seattle process also causes delay while politicians either tinker with, or obstruct, proposals. Other cities in the area declare their ability to get projects because of the lack of Seattle process.

== See also ==
- Justice delayed is justice denied – Legal maxim
- Seattle Freeze – Social phenomenon in Seattle, Washington
- Polder model – Dutch method of consensus decision-making
