= Cooperativeness =

Personality trait

Cooperativeness is a personality trait that concerns how much a person is generally agreeable in their relations with other people as opposed to aggressively self-centered and hostile.

It is one of the "character" dimensions in Cloninger's Temperament and Character Inventory. Cloninger described it as relating to individual differences in how much people identify with and accept others. Cloninger's research found that low cooperativeness is associated with all categories of personality disorder. Cooperativeness is conceptually similar to and strongly correlated with agreeableness in the five factor model of personality.

== Description ==
Cloninger described cooperative individuals as socially tolerant, empathic, helpful, and compassionate, as opposed to intolerant, callous, unhelpful, and vengeful. He compared cooperativeness to Carl Rogers' description of facilitative people who show unconditional acceptance of others, empathy with others' feelings, and willingness to help without a desire for selfish domination. Cloninger regarded high cooperativeness as a sign of psychological maturity and of advanced moral development as described by Kohlberg.

== Components ==
Cooperativeness is assessed with five subscales in the Temperament and Character Inventory:

1. Social acceptance vs. intolerance (C1)
2. Empathy vs. social disinterest (C2)
3. Helpfulness vs. unhelpfulness (C3)
4. Compassion vs. revengefulness (C4)
5. Principles vs. self-advantage (C5)

== Relationship to other personality traits ==
Cooperativeness is similar in content to and strongly correlated with agreeableness in the Big five personality model. It is inversely correlated with Aggression-Hostility and psychoticism in Zuckerman's Alternative five model and the Eysenck Personality Questionnaire respectively.

== Psychopathology ==
Researchers suggested that a combination of low self-directedness and low cooperativeness form a general factor common to all personality disorders. The specific combination of low self-directedness, low cooperativeness, and high self-transcendence has been described as a "schizotypal personality" style by Cloninger and colleagues, and has been found to be associated with high levels of schizotypy (proneness to psychotic symptoms).
