= Nise =

Nise may refer to:

== Geography ==
- Nice, France
- Nise, Nigeria

== Art and literature ==
- Nise: The Heart of Madness, a 2015 Brazilian film
  - Nise da Silveira, Brazilian psychologist and subject of the film
- Nise daigakusei, a 1960 Japanese drama film
- Nise Murasaki inaka Genji, an ancient Japanese text
- Nise-e, a style of Japanese portrait

== Other uses ==
- Pyrisitia nise, a butterfly
- Nise Tablet, a pain medication

== See also ==
- Nice (disambiguation)
- Nais (disambiguation)
- Gneiss, a type of metamorphic rock
