= Nais (Lydia) =

Town of ancient Lydia

Coordinates: 38°25′37″N 29°12′41″E

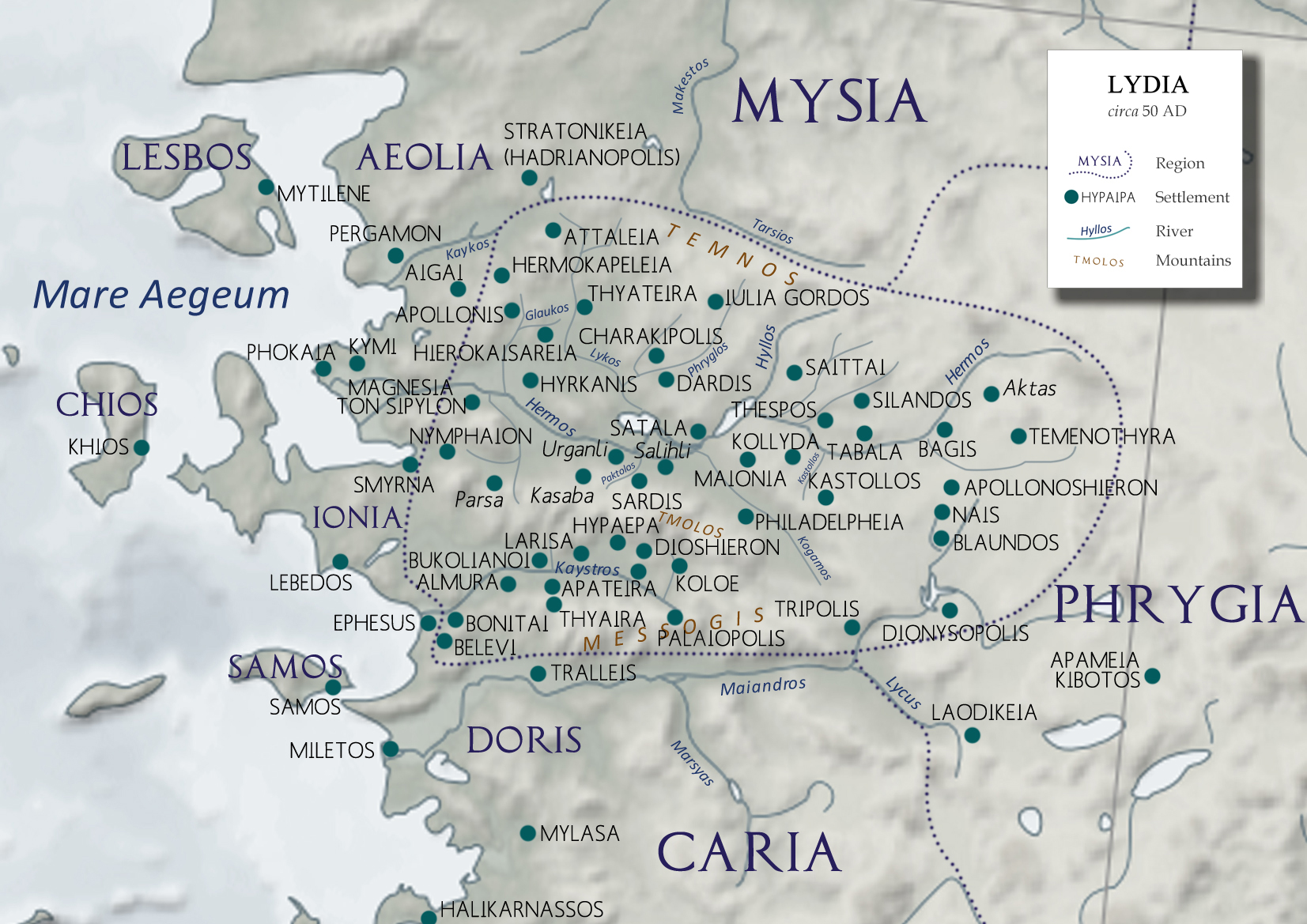
Lydia in about 50 CE.

Nais was a town of ancient Lydia, inhabited during Roman times.

Its site is located about one mile (1.6 km) south of İnay in Asiatic Turkey.
