= NASA Acquisition Internet Service =

The NASA Acquisition Internet Service (NAIS) is a service provided by the NASA in order to disseminate information about NASA procurements. NAIS has been hailed by the GAO as "an effective mechanism for disseminating procurement information to industry, including small businesses."
