= Nice (surname) =

Nice is a surname. Notable people with the surname include:

- Geoffrey Nice (born 1945), British barrister and activist
- Harry Nice (1877–1941), governor of Maryland, USA
- Hellé Nice (1900–1984), name assumed by Mariette Hélène Delangle, a French motor racing driver
- Margaret Morse Nice (1883–1974), American ornithologist
