= Nice Classification =

Nice Classification may refer to:

- International (Nice) Classification of Goods and Services, a system of classifying goods and services for the purpose of registering trademarks
- NICE (Narrow-band imaging International Colorectal Endoscopic) classification, a classification of colorectal polyps in colonoscopy
