= Agreeableness =

Personality trait

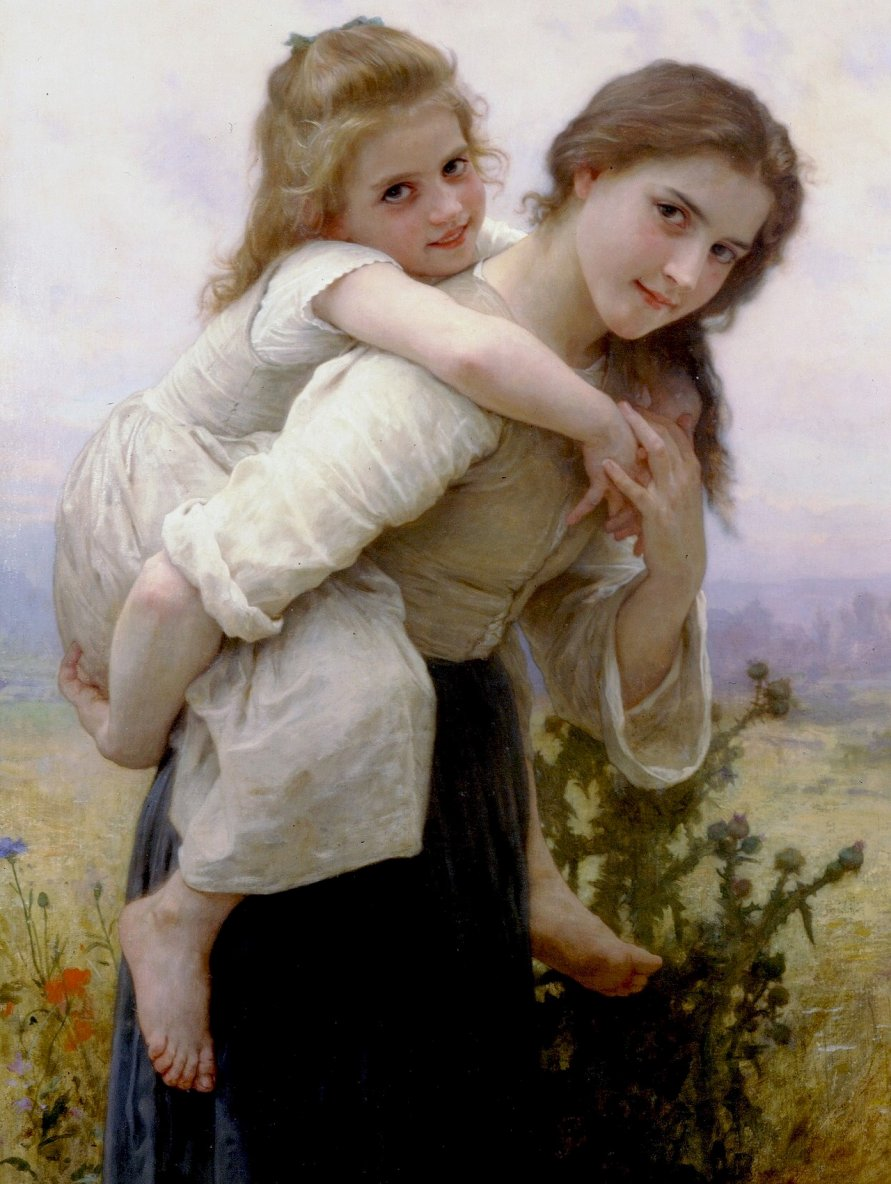
Agreeable Burden (Fardeau agréable) (William-Adolphe Bouguereau, 1895)

Agreeableness is the personality trait of being kind, sympathetic, cooperative, warm, honest, straightforward, and considerate. In personality psychology, agreeableness is one of the five major dimensions of personality structure, reflecting individual differences in cooperation. People who score high on measures of agreeableness are empathetic and self-sacrificing, while those with low agreeableness are prone to selfishness, insincerity, and zero-sum thinking. Those who score low on agreeableness may show dark triad tendencies, such as narcissistic, antisocial, and manipulative behavior.

Agreeableness is a superordinate trait, meaning it is a grouping of personality sub-traits that cluster together statistically. Some lower-level traits, or facets, that are commonly grouped under agreeableness include trust, straightforwardness, altruism, helpfulness, modesty, and tender-mindedness.

== History ==
=== Early trait research ===
As is the case with all Big Five personality traits, the roots of the modern concept of agreeableness can be traced to a 1936 study by Gordon Allport and Henry S. Odbert. Seven years after that study, Raymond Cattell published a cluster analysis of the thousands of personality-related words identified by Allport and Odbert. The clusters identified in this study served as a foundation for Cattell's further attempts to identify fundamental, universal, human personality factors. Cattell eventually determined 16 personality factors (16PF) by means of factor analysis. Further factor analyses revealed five higher-order, or "global", factors that encompass these 16. Although labelled "independence" by Cattell, one of the global factors identified by the 16PF Questionnaire was an early precursor to the modern concept of agreeableness.

=== Big Five ===
Agreeableness in the five factor model of personality is most commonly measured by self-report, although peer-reports and third-party observation can also be used. Self-report measures are either lexical or based on statements. Which measure is used depends on an assessment of psychometric properties and the time and space constraints of the research being undertaken.

Lexical measures use individual adjectives that reflect agreeableness or disagreeableness traits, such as sympathetic, cooperative, warm, considerate, harsh, unkind, rude. Words representing disagreeableness are reverse coded. Goldberg (1992) developed a 20-word measure as part of his 100-word Big Five markers, and Saucier (1994) developed a briefer 8-word measure as part of his 40-word mini-markers. Thompson (2008) revised these markers to develop a 40-word measure with better psychometric properties in both American and non-American populations: the International English Mini-Markers. This brief measure has good internal consistency reliabilities and other validity for assessing agreeableness and other five factor personality dimensions, both within and, especially, without American populations. Internal consistency reliability of the agreeableness measure for native English-speakers is reported as .86, that for non-native English-speakers is .80.

Statement measures tend to comprise more words, and hence consume more research instrument space, than lexical measures. Respondents are asked the extent to which they, for example, [are] on good terms with nearly everyone, [are] not interested in other people's problems or [s]ympathize with others' feelings.

Cattell's factor analytic approach, which aimed to identify universal personality structures, inspired many studies in the decades following the introduction of the 16PF. Using Cattell's original clusters, the 16PF, and original data, multiple researchers independently developed a five factor model of personality over this period. From the early 1960s on, these explorations typically included a factor called "agreeableness" or "sociability". Despite repeated replications of five stable personality factors following Cattell's pioneering work, this framework only began to dominate personality research in the early 1980s with the work of Lewis Goldberg. Using lexical studies similar to those of Allport and Odbert, Goldberg chose the term "Big Five" to reflect the sheer number of personality-related terms encompassed by each of these five distinct factors. One of these, agreeableness, was defined by a number of personality-related words similar to those present in earlier and more recent manifestations of the construct; examples include "friendly", "good-natured", "cooperative", "trustful", "nurturing", "sociable", and "considerate".

=== NEO PI ===
Beginning in the 1970s, Paul Costa and Robert McCrae began researching the development of personality assessments based on factor models. Beginning with cluster analyses of Cattell's 16PF, Costa and McCrae initially settled on a three-factor model of personality. These three factors were neuroticism (vs. emotional stability), extraversion (vs. introversion), and openness (vs. closedness) to experience, resulting in the acronym "NEO." Due to similarities between their three-factor NEO Personality Inventory and Goldberg's Big Five, Costa and McCrae began to develop scales to assess agreeableness and conscientiousness in the early 1980s. This work culminated in the 1985 publication of the first NEO PI Manual to be based on the full Five Factor Model. Although this marked the introduction of agreeableness to the NEO PI, Costa and McCrae worked for an additional seven years to identify and elaborate on the facets comprising this factor in the Revised NEO Personality Inventory.

== NEO PI facets ==
In the NEO PI, each of the five factors identified by Costa and McCrae are identified with six lower-level traits. Known as facets, the lower-level traits subsumed by agreeableness were first introduced with the 1992 publication of the revised version of the NEO PI. Based on the modern NEO PI-R, the six facets of agreeableness are: trust, straightforwardness, altruism, compliance, modesty, and tender-mindedness.

=== Trust ===
Trust is viewed to be an important feature of psychosocial development, personality theory, and folk psychological conceptions of personality. Individuals who score high on trust generally believe others' intentions to be benevolent and can be naive if taken to the extreme. Those scoring low on this facet tend to be cynical and paranoid and view others as suspicious, dishonest, or dangerous.

=== Straightforwardness ===
Straightforwardness is the quality of being direct, open, and honest in communicating with others. Despite a long history in moral philosophy, straightforwardness is not as vital to personality theory as the other facets of agreeableness. Those scoring high on straightforwardness tend to interact with others in a direct and honest manner. Low scorers are less direct, tend to be high in self-monitoring, are more reticent. Those who score low on this facet also tend to be high in Machiavellianism, being deceitful or manipulative with others. Straightforwardness is similar to a dimension in the Interpersonal circumplex called "ingenuous versus calculating." According to Michael C. Ashton and Kibeom Lee, straightforwardness is similar to the honesty aspect of honesty-humility in the HEXACO Model.

=== Altruism ===
Similar to altruism in animals and ethical altruism, this facet is defined by measures of selflessness, self-sacrifice, generosity, and consideration, courtesy, and concern for others. Altruism is similar to Alfred Adler's concept of social interest, which is a tendency to direct one's actions toward the betterment of society. Individuals who score low on altruism tend to be discourteous, selfish, or greedy, a pattern of behaviors known as "self-interest" in Adlerian psychology.

=== Compliance ===
As a facet of agreeableness, compliance is defined as an individual's typical response to conflict. Those who score high on compliance tend to be meek and mild, and to prefer cooperation or deference as a means of resolving conflict. Low scorers tend to be aggressive, antagonistic, competitive, quarrelsome, and vindictive.

=== Modesty ===
While trust, straightforwardness, altruism, and compliance all refer to interpersonal or social behaviors, modesty refers to an individual's self-concept. Those who score high on modesty tend to be humble and other-focused, while low scorers tend to be arrogant, ostentatious, and self-aggrandizing. Low modesty is otherwise known as conceitedness or narcissism and, in extreme cases, can manifest as narcissistic personality disorder or histrionic personality disorder. Otherwise known as "humility" in the Revised NEO Personality Inventory, modesty resembles the humility aspect of honesty-humility in the HEXACO model.

=== Tender-mindedness ===
Tender-mindedness is defined as the extent to which an individual's judgments and attitudes are determined by emotion. Coined by William James, this term was also prominent in early versions of the 16PF. Tender-mindedness is primarily defined by sympathy and corresponds to the International Personality Item Pool's "sympathy" scale. In contrast, "tough minded" is a trait associated with Psychoticism on the Eysenck Personality Questionnaire.

== Equivalents in psychobiological models ==
Models based on psychobiological theories of personality have each incorporated a factor similar to agreeableness. In Cloninger's Temperament and Character Inventory the character trait known as cooperativeness is very similar to and positively correlated with agreeableness. In Zuckerman's alternative five model of personality the trait known as aggression-hostility is inversely related to agreeableness.

== HEXACO model ==
To address the absence of measures of dark triad traits (i.e., narcissism, machiavellianism, and psychopathy), Michael Ashton and Kibeom Lee proposed the addition of a sixth factor to the five factor model. Validated with psycholexical studies similar to those used in the development of the five factor model, the HEXACO model adds honesty-humility to five factors resembling those in the NEO PI. Although honesty-humility does not directly correspond to any Big Five trait, it is strongly correlated with the straightforwardness and modesty facets of Big Five agreeableness. As both of these facets are only weakly correlated with Big Five agreeableness, Ashton and Lee suggest dividing NEO PI agreeableness into two factors similar to those in the HEXACO model: honesty-humility (i.e., straightforwardness and modesty) and a redefined agreeableness (trust, altruism, compliance, and tender-mindedness). Reflecting this conception of honesty-humility and HEXACO agreeableness as unique though similar concepts, Ashton and Lee propose that they represent different aspects of reciprocal altruism: fairness (honesty-humility) and tolerance (agreeableness).

Despite suggesting this reconceptualization of agreeableness for the NEO PI, Ashton and Lee do not believe HEXACO agreeableness is accurately captured by trust, altruism, compliance, and tender-mindedness. In addition to accounting for these four facets of Big Five agreeableness, the HEXACO model's construction of agreeableness includes content categorized under neuroticism in the NEO PI (i.e., temperamentalness and irritability). To reflect the negative emotional content at the low end of HEXACO agreeableness, this factor is also referred to as "agreeableness (versus anger)." The inclusion of anger in the definition of HEXACO agreeableness further helps to differentiate this factor from honesty-humility. In response to offensive or transgressive actions, individuals who score low on honesty-humility tend not to respond immediately. Instead, they defer their response by planning their revenge and waiting for the perfect opportunity to enact it. Although those who score low on HEXACO agreeableness also employ this premeditated strategy, they also tend to respond immediately with anger.

=== HEXACO agreeableness facets ===
To help capture the numerous distinctions between the Big Five and HEXACO models, Ashton and Lee propose four new facet labels in their conceptualization of agreeableness: forgiveness, gentleness, flexibility, and patience. In addition to these four Agreeableness-specific facets, Lee and Ashton have proposed an additional "interstitial" facet located in a space shared by agreeableness, honesty-humility, and emotionality: altruism versus antagonism.

- Forgiveness: A measure of an individual's response to deception or other transgressions. Individuals who score high on this facet tend to regain their trust and re-establish friendly relations by forgiving the offender, while those who score low tend to hold a grudge. Also known as "forgivingness".
- Gentleness: A measure of how an individual typically evaluates others. Individuals who score high on this facet tend to avoid being overly judgmental, while those who score low are highly critical and judgmental.
- Flexibility: A measure of behaviors related to compromise and cooperation. Individuals who score high on this facet prefer cooperation and compromise as means of resolving disagreement, while those who score low tend to be stubborn, argumentative, and unwilling to accommodate others.
- Patience: A measure of one's response to anger and aggravation. Individuals who score high on this facet tend to be able to tolerate very high levels of anger and maintain their composure while expressing anger. Those who score low on patience have difficulties remaining calm while expressing their anger and tend to have quick tempers, becoming very angry in response to comparatively little provocation.
- Altruism versus antagonism: Although shared between three HEXACO factors, altruism versus antagonism is moderately correlated with agreeableness. This interstitial facet assesses the extent to which an individual is sympathetic, soft-hearted, and helpful, with low-scoring individuals tending toward an antagonistic interpersonal style.

== Interpersonal relations ==
Agreeableness is an asset in situations that require getting along with others. Compared to disagreeable persons, agreeable individuals display a tendency to perceive others in a more positive light.

Because agreeable children are more sensitive to the needs and perspectives of others, they are less likely to suffer from social rejection. Children who are less disruptive, less aggressive, and more skilled at entering play groups are more likely to gain acceptance by their peers.

One study found that people high in agreeableness are more emotionally responsive in social situations. This effect was measured on both self-report questionnaires and physiological measures, and offers evidence that extraversion and neuroticism are not the only Big Five personality factors that influence emotion. The effect was especially pronounced among women.

Research also shows that people high in agreeableness are more likely to control negative emotions like anger in conflict situations. Those who are high in agreeableness are more likely to use conflict-avoidant tactics when in conflict with others (whereas people low in agreeableness are more likely to use coercive tactics, like stonewalling or shunning). They are also more willing to give ground to their adversary and may lose arguments with people who are less agreeable. From their perspective, they have not really lost an argument as much as maintained a congenial relationship with another person.

== Prosocial behaviour ==
Agreeableness is positively associated with altruism and helping behaviour. Across situations, people who are high in agreeableness are more likely to report an interest and involvement with helping others. Experiments have shown that most people are likely to help their own kin, and to help when empathy has been aroused. Agreeable people are likely to help even when these conditions are not present. In other words, agreeable people appear to be "traited for helping" and do not need any other motivations.

While agreeable individuals are habitually likely to help others, disagreeable people may be more likely to cause harm. Researchers have found that low levels of agreeableness are associated with hostile thoughts and aggression in adolescents, as well as poor social adjustment. People low in agreeableness are also more likely to be prejudiced against stigmatized groups such as the overweight.

However, high agreeableness does not always lead to prosocial behaviour. In a Milgram experiment, conscientious and agreeable people, when advised by an ill-intending authority, are more willing to administer high-intensity electric shocks to a victim, because conscientious and agreeable people are less capable of resistance.

== Intelligence ==
Agreeableness and its related traits have generally been assumed to be uncorrelated with cognitive abilities. In general, it does have the fewest and smallest connections with intelligence. However, large-scale meta-analyses have revealed that the aspects of agreeableness (i.e., compassion and politeness) have meaningful and opposite relations with cognitive abilities. For example, compassion correlates .26 with general mental ability whereas politeness correlates -.22 with general science knowledge. Facets of agreeableness also demonstrate some meaningful connections with various cognitive abilities (e.g., cooperation and processing speed correlate .20, modesty and ideational fluency correlate -.17).

== From childhood to adulthood ==
Agreeableness is important to psychological well-being, predicting mental health, positive affect, and good relations with others. Both childhood and adolescent agreeableness have predictive value. Along with this it has also been implicated to conflict management skills, school adjustment, peer-social status, and self-esteem. Among young adults, individuals that have been diagnosed with externalizing as well as internalizing disorders present lower levels of agreeableness and communion, and higher levels of negative emotionality, than those young adults without such disorders. Disorders such as major depressive disorder negatively correlate to levels of agreeableness. Agreeableness has been reported to mediate anger and depression in young adults. Across adulthood, low agreeableness has been found to be a health risk. High agreeableness, especially trust and honesty, has been linked to longevity.

A study done by Caspi, Elder, and Bem (1987) found that explosive and ill-tempered children had higher rates of divorce as adults when compared with their even-tempered peers. Further, ill-tempered men had lower educational attainment, occupational status, and work stability, and ill-tempered women married men with similar low achievement profiles. A second and more recent study by Shiner (2000) found that composite variables describing middle-childhood agreeableness and friendly compliance predicted adolescent academic performance, behavioral conduct, and social competence ten years later. Some personality traits, such as openness, agreeableness and conscientiousness appear remarkably common among patients with Amyotrophic lateral sclerosis (ALS). It is not clear whether personality can increase susceptibility to ALS directly. Instead, genetic factors giving rise to personality might simultaneously predispose people to develop ALS, or the above personality traits might underlie lifestyle choices which are in turn risk factors for ALS.

== Geography ==
=== United States ===
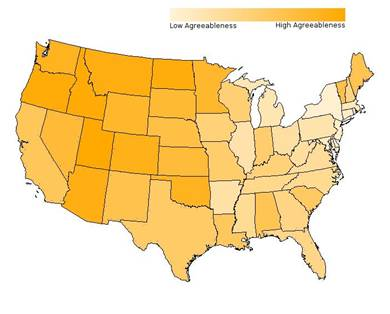
Agreeableness by state. Lighter regions have lower average agreeableness.

In the United States, people in the West, Midwest, and South tend to have higher average scores on agreeableness than people living in other regions. According to researchers, the top ten most agreeable states are North Dakota, Minnesota, Mississippi, Utah, Wisconsin, Tennessee, North Carolina, Georgia, Oklahoma, and Nebraska. These findings are consistent with well-known expressions in these states, such as "southern hospitality" and "Minnesota nice." Because these states are generally less urbanized than the east and west coasts, people may be more likely to live in small communities and know their neighbors. Consequently, they may be more willing to care about and help their neighbours.

=== China ===
In a study done by Albright et al. (1997) groups of college students from China and the United States rated strangers from both countries on the "Big Five" personality traits, external traits, and how well they were dressed. They found that both Chinese and U.S. students rated faces as showing similar levels of agreeableness and extroversion. The people who were thought to be the most agreeable wore smiles, a facial expression that is recognized around the world. The findings seem to suggest that the trait of agreeableness is attributed to people in a universal way.

According to a 2021 analysis by Princeton University academic Rory Truex of survey results, high agreeableness in China correlates with support and membership of the Chinese Communist Party (CCP), while low agreeableness correlates with discontent with the CCP.

=== Russia ===
According to a 2017 research, higher agreeableness in Russia is correlated with higher support for President Vladimir Putin, while lower agreeableness is correlated with discontent with him.

== See also ==
- Facet (psychology) – Specific and unique aspect of a broader personality trait
- Lexical hypothesis – Personality traits reflected in language
- Faz'ah
