= Southern hospitality =

Cultural label of American Southerners as open and hospitable

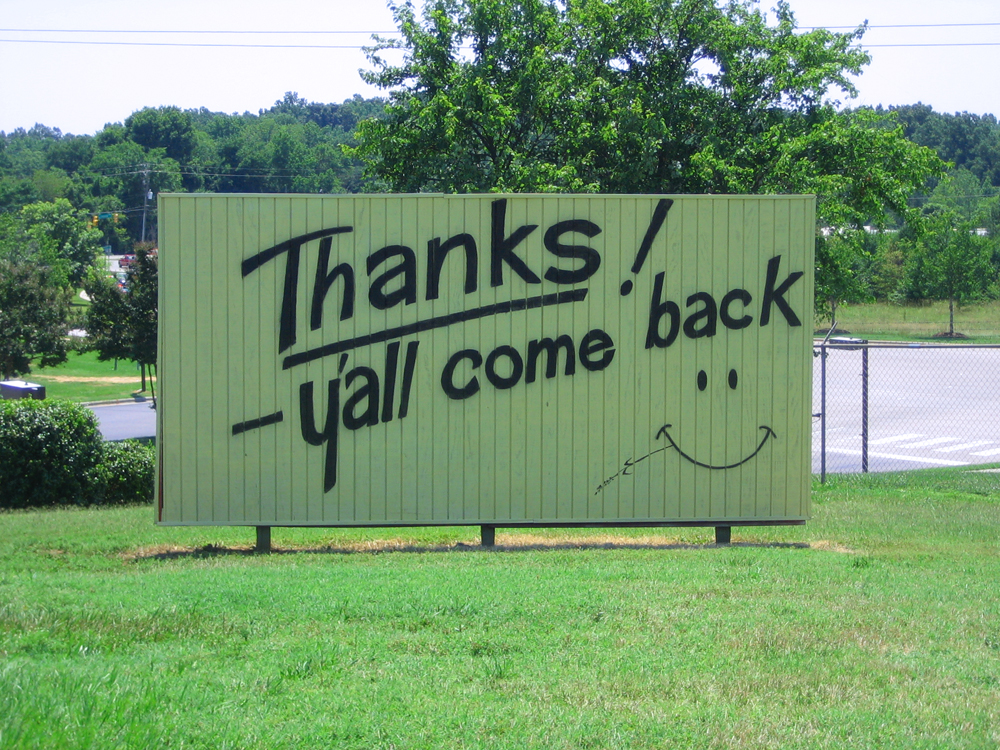
Sign in Raleigh, North Carolina with a hospitable message

Southern hospitality is a phrase used in American English to describe a cultural stereotype of the Southern United States, with residents perceived as showing kindness, warmth, and a welcoming of visitors to their homes, or to the South in general.

== Origins ==
Although Southerners from all walks of life have been perceived as friendly for centuries, some like the writer Anthony Szczesiul claim that Southern hospitality "first existed as a narrowly defined body of social practices among the antebellum planters' classes". As such, the origin of the practice was intimately tied to slavery in the United States. One analysis notes:

African Americans had little place in this initial conceptualization of hospitality beyond the role of servant. Yet, it was the labor and hardships of the enslaved that allowed southern planters to entertain their guests so lavishly and seemingly so effortlessly. Southern hospitality from and for whites was in large part achieved by being inhospitable and inhumane to African Americans.

Over time, however, the concept "developed into a discourse that stretches far beyond the image of the planter class", and the principles of Southern hospitality were eventually adopted by non-planter class and Southern African Americans as well, and incorporated into materials used to advertise destinations in the South to other African American tourists. The concept of Southern hospitality has also been examined as a reflection of the religious beliefs of the region; the idea that one should be good to strangers is an outgrowth of such Biblical parables as the Good Samaritan. Early travel writer Ernest Hamlin Abbott wrote in 1902, "as religious observances are in the South as naturally included in the hospitality of the home as anything else, so, conversely, hospitality in the South is an integral part of the church services".

== Features ==
Some characteristics of Southern hospitality were described as early as 1835, when Jacob Abbott attributed the poor quality of taverns in the South to the lack of need for them, given the willingness of Southerners to provide for strangers. Abbott writes:

[T]he hospitality of southerners is so profuse, that taverns are but poorly supported. A traveler, with the garb and the manners of a gentleman, finds a welcome at every door. A stranger is riding on horseback through Virginia or Carolina. It is noon. He sees a plantation, surrounded with trees, a little distance from the road. Without hesitation he rides to the door. The gentleman of the house sees his approach and is ready upon the steps.

Abbott further describes how the best stores of the house are at the disposal of visitors. Furthermore, says Abbott:

Conversation flows cheeringly, for the southern gentleman has a particular tact in making a guest happy. After dinner you are urged to pass the afternoon and night, and if you are a gentleman in manners and information, your host will be in reality highly gratified by your so doing.
Such is the character of southern hospitality.

More recently, Tara McPherson writes about the representation of "tradition and manners" as "the glue that binds the South together, distinguishing it from other regions", going on to say that:

This is a familiar mantra, one linked to the "famous" southern hospitality capitalized on by many of the tourist attractions... Contemporary fascinations with the "grandeur" of the Old South depend on a certain sense of decorum, and this genteel mise-en-scene of southernness is constructed via a carefully manipulated stage set of moonlight, magnolias, and manners. White southerners frequently stress the importance of keeping up appearances; for example, in her Womenfolks: Growing Up Down South, popular writer Shirley Abbott describes the "natural theatricality" inherent in southern hospitality. It requires "a talent for taking on a special role in a comedy of manners that will apparently run forever, no matter how transparent its characters and aims". This maintenance of an aura of tranquility despite a certain degree of transparency suggests that southern hospitality is a performance, a masquerade, an agreed-on social fiction, albeit a powerful one with material effects.

Food figures highly in Southern hospitality, a large component of the idea being the provision of Southern cuisine to visitors. A cake or other delicacy is often brought to the door of a new neighbor as a mechanism of introduction. Many club and church functions include a meal or at least a dessert and beverage. Churches in the South frequently have large commercial style kitchens to accommodate this tradition, but many "fellowship suppers" are "covered dish": everyone attending brings a dish. However, if a newcomer arrives without a dish, he or she will be made to feel welcome and served generously. When a death or serious illness occurs, neighbors, friends, and church members generally bring food to the bereaved family for a period of time. A number of cookbooks promise recipes advancing this concept.

== See also ==
- Iowa nice
- Minnesota nice
- Seattle Freeze
