= National Information & Credit Evaluation =

Korea's largest comprehensive credit information provider

- Company type: Credit Rating agency
- Industry: Financial
- Founded: 1986

National Information & Credit Evaluation (NICE Group) is a credit information group with operations in South Korea.

Formerly known as National Information & Credit Evaluation Inc., NICE GROUP was founded in 1986. It launched a credit information service in 1989 for the first time in Korea and has gradually expanded its business scope into adjacent areas, including ATM, credit card VAN and asset management. NICE GROUP's business portfolio consists of three major pillars: credit information, financial service and manufacturing.

In 2010, a merger between 2 large South Korean companies, National Information & Credit Evaluation Inc., and Korea Information Service, Inc, led to the foundation of NICE Credit Information Service Co., Ltd, which it was formally named in 2013.

The company's shares have been listed on the Korea Composite Stock Price Index (KOSPI) since 2000.
