= Samuel D. Gosling =

Samuel David Gosling is a personality and social psychologist with interests in social perception, cross-species, and trends in the history of psychology. His work in social perception examines how people form impressions on others through their behavior, appearance, and physical environment, while his work with cross-species examines how animals can lead to theories of personality and social psychology. For instance, he studied individual differences in personality and social behaviors, and how personality traits are portrayed and described in a number of different species including humans, hyenas, dogs, and cats. In general, Gosling's research pertains to evolutionary and ecological principles. He holds a PhD from the University of California at Berkeley, and is currently a professor within the Department of Psychology at the University of Texas at Austin.

== Research ==
=== Social perception ===
Gosling's work on social perception seeks to examine the fundamental processes of impression formation through everyday environments. It is hypothesized that much can be explained about a person from a collection of various environmental cues. These cues consist of self- and other- directed identity claims, and interior and exterior behavioral residue, both of which can be found in one’s home, bedroom, work environment, and even one's personal online space. Gosling's work also investigates whether those impressions are correct and representative of the individual. Much of his work focuses on consensus between observers, accuracy of the observers' perceptions, perception agreement between the observer and the individual, and stereotyping.

A considerable amount of information can be gathered about another person by observing his or her belongings found in their personal living space, including both their physical and virtual world. While it may be expected that observed individuals may manipulate their personal spaces, it is difficult to obtain a pristine impression even if one attempts to. Furthermore, most individuals desire to be perceived as they actually are rather than as their ideal selves. Although consensus among people tends to vary, most people tend to be relatively accurate in their personality predictions based on others’ personal spaces. Stereotypes can play a helpful role in accuracy when there is slight truth to the assumption as well as when the observer correctly guesses the gender of the individual.

=== Cross-species ===
His research on animals focuses on developing animal models for further research in personality, social, and health psychology, as well as gaining an understanding of the general processes of personality perception from the basis of perceptions of animal personality. Animal models are particularly useful because they allow for studies that could not be conducted with human beings. There are three stages of assessing personality in non-human animals: The first stage is to assess whether it is possible to assess personality in non-human animals, the second is to develop methods of testing on the animals, and the third stage is to address questions related to personality, social, and health psychology.
