= Metamood =

Individual's awareness of their own emotions

Meta-mood is a term used by psychologists to refer to an individual's awareness of their emotions. The term was first utilized by John D. Mayer and Peter Salovey who believed the experience of mood involved "direct" and "indirect" components. While the direct level refers to the simple appearance of mood - happiness, fear, anger, sadness, and surprise (often referred to as the six basic emotions, introduced by Paul Ekman), the indirect level, or the meta-mood experience, does not solely consist of the emotions experienced by an individual in the moment. Rather, it is a reflective state which involves additional thoughts and feelings about the mood itself. "I shouldn’t feel this way" or "I am thinking of ways to improve my mood" are examples of reflective thoughts during a meta-mood experience.

Meta-mood is also a facet of emotional intelligence. Alexithymia, or the inability to identify and describe one's own or others' emotions, is generally viewed as antagonistic to meta-mood, as individuals who have symptoms of alexithymia often have trouble describing and analyzing their emotions. Individuals who are less reflective and emotionally stable tend to report fewer meta-mood experiences, and commonly do not need them. On the other hand, individuals who are generally self-aware and have high emotionality have highly developed meta-mood experiences. Studies have shown that individuals who are able to improve negative moods through meta-emotions are seen to possess healthier personalities than individuals who are not able to have such experiences.

== Individual meta-mood experiences ==
Variance in meta-mood reflective states among individuals helps determine the different mechanisms individuals utilize to recognize, monitor, and regulate their feelings and emotions. The means by which individuals recognize their current mood, distinguish between different feelings, and adjust their emotions is crucial for the understanding of adaptive strategies they use to cope with interpersonal conflict and stress in their lives.

The measurement of trait meta-mood involves three main components: attention to feelings (the individual awareness of one's mood), clarity of feelings (the individual ability to distinguish between moods), and mood repair (the ability to regulate mood from a negative to positive state). Among the three components, mood repair is considered the most significant in achieving a healthy emotional mindset. Mood regulation takes place on both conscious and unconscious levels. Mayer et al. contends that "a negative mood that is evaluated as out of control, unacceptable, and long-lasting is devastating; but were the evaluations reversed so as to view the mood as under control and soon to change, the overall feeling would be far less destructive to one’s equanimity". Self-control and self-regulation are crucial components of emotional intelligence and are associated with positive cognitive responses to social interactions.

Coping strategies individuals use are central determinants of overall psychological well-being and mental health. Previous research has shown that meta-mood is linked to lower levels of depression and anxiety, and higher levels self-esteem. The perceived ability to distinguish and repair distressing moods or preserve positive moods predicts superior overall well-being. Emotional repair is also found to have direct links to the maintenance of subjective happiness. Meta-mood experiences, such as mood clarity and emotional repair, are high predictors of life satisfaction. Individuals who are prone to being open about their emotions and who recognize their negative and positive responses towards a variety of environmental stressors have a greater probability of experiencing higher levels of life satisfaction than individuals who withhold their emotions. Individuals who are aware of their emotional states and are able to regulate their cognitive and emotional responses, are able to turn their attention towards coping strategies in difficult situations and minimize the psychological impact of stressful events. Ultimately, individuals prone to meta-mood experiences are able to acknowledge and respond to external environmental demands more easily and recover from troubled situations at a quicker pace. However, individuals low on emotional intelligence often exhibit avoidance-oriented and emotion-oriented coping styles. In addition, individuals who are not able to regulate and repair negative mood states have higher reports of illness.

== Implications for psychotherapy ==
Comprehending and measuring the degree to which individuals are able to respond to and understand their emotions is an important precondition if one were to predict future behaviors, emotional disorders, and psychological maladjustments. Meta-mood experiences have possible implications for a variety of treatments and preventative measures within the field of clinical psychology and psychotherapy. Mood repair is key in tackling the harmful effects of anxiety, depression, and other psychological conditions. As such, a variety of studies concerning meta-mood experiences have accentuated the importance of positive psychology and stress management programs for assisting individuals in coping with distressing situations in daily life. In their study, Lourdes Rey et al. have argued that "it seems reasonable to assume that individuals might be able to be trained to acquire mood repair abilities, given the high similarity between mood repair and other traditional techniques like positive refocusing or learned optimism styles". Training individuals to be aware of their emotions, to be able to differentiate among different feelings, and consequently change their mood, is useful in psychotherapy because patients with meta-mood experiences are better equipped to handle difficult situations. Studies have shown that mindfulness intervention in colleges increases meta-mood experiences of students, and therefore leads to an improvement in student well-being. Mindfulness meditation consists of attentional training and focuses on developing insight into one's emotional experience. In addition, when patients believe that their mood and meta-mood experiences are understood, they are more willing to open up about their character, their fears, and their core beliefs.

== Trait meta-mood scale ==
The Trait Meta-Mood Scale (TMMS) is used to measure emotional beliefs and attitudes people have towards their own emotional experiences. The TMMS scale measures three cognitive components of emotional intelligence: attention to feelings, clarity of feelings, and mood repair. Scores on the TMMS are utilized to analyse stable individual differences in the manner through which individuals respond to their emotional states. Individuals who score high on the TMMS scale have less melancholic thoughts, lower levels of anxiety and depression, and lower rates of borderline personality disorders. In a 7-week study examining the link between meta-mood and subjective happiness, higher scores on the TMMS were associated with fewer negative psychological reactions to interpersonal conflicts, measured through cortisol and blood pressure changes.
