= Social intelligence =

Capacity to know oneself and to know others

Social intelligence (SI), sometimes referenced as social intelligence quotient or (SQ), is the ability to understand one's own and others' actions. Social intelligence is learned and develops from experience with people and learning from success and failures in social settings. It is an important interpersonal skill that helps individuals succeed in all aspects of their lives.

== History ==
The original definition of social intelligence (by Edward Thorndike in 1920) is "the ability to understand and manage men and women and boys and girls, to act wisely in human relations". It is thus equivalent to interpersonal intelligence, one of the types of intelligence identified in Howard Gardner's theory of multiple intelligences, and closely related to theory of mind.

Social scientist Ross Honeywill postulates that social intelligence is an aggregated measure of self- and social-awareness, evolved social beliefs and attitudes, and a capacity and appetite to manage complex social change. Neuropsychologist Nicholas Humphrey believes that social intelligence defines who we are as humans.

An updated definition coined by Nancy Cantor and John F. Kihlstrom in 1987 is “the individual's fund of knowledge about the social world." In 2006 Eleni Andreou described social intelligence as being similar to "social skills and competence".

Social intelligence and interpersonal intelligence were previously believed to be closely related, however, the subjects diverged into two distinct fields of study.

Other authors restricted the definition to concern only knowledge of social situations, perhaps more properly called social cognition (or social marketing intelligence, as it pertains to trending socio-psychological advertising and marketing strategies and tactics). According to Sean Foleno, social intelligence is a person's competence to optimally understand one's environment and react appropriately for socially successful conduct.

These multiple definitions demonstrate a lack of consensus on the operational definition of social intelligence.

In psychology, Social Intelligence is a critical subset of human intelligence centered around two core components: social awareness and social facility.

Social cognition refers to the capacity to understand and empathize with others’ emotions and perspectives, while social facility pertains to the ability to behave effectively in social situations.

== Hypothesis ==
The social intelligence hypothesis states that social intelligence (that is, complex socialization such as politics, romance, family relationships, quarrels, collaboration, reciprocity, and altruism):

1. Was a driving force in developing the size of human brains or "executive brains"
2. Today provides our ability to use those large brains in complex social circumstances.

This hypothesis claims that the demands of living together drives our need for intelligence, and that social intelligence is an evolutionary adaptation for dealing with highly complex social situations, as well as for gaining and maintaining power in social groups.

Archaeologist Steve Mithen believes that there are two key evolutionary periods of human brain growth that contextualize the social intelligence hypothesis. The first was about two million years ago, when the brain more than doubled in size. Mithen believes that this growth was because people were living in larger, more complex groups, and had to keep track of more people and relationships. These changes required a greater mental capacity and, in turn, a larger brain size.

The second key growth period in human brain size occurred between 600,000 and 200,000 years ago, when the brain reached its modern size. While this growth is still not fully explained, Mithen believes that it is related to the evolution of language. Language may be the most complex cognitive task we undertake. Language is related to social intelligence because it is used to mediate social relationships.

Social intelligence was a critical factor in brain growth. Social and cognitive complexity co-evolve.

== Measurement ==
The social intelligence quotient (SQ) is a statistical abstraction, similar to the ‘standard score’ approach used in IQ tests, with a mean of 100. Scores of 140 or above are considered to be very high. Unlike the standard IQ test, it is not a fixed model. It leans more toward Jean Piaget's theory that intelligence is not a fixed attribute, but a complex hierarchy of information-processing skills underlying an adaptive equilibrium between the individual and the environment. Therefore, an individual can change their SQ by altering their attitudes and behavior in response to their social environment.

SQ had been measured by techniques such as question and answer sessions. These sessions assessed the person's pragmatic abilities to test eligibility in certain special education courses; however, some tests have been developed to measure social intelligence. This test can be used to diagnose autism spectrum disorders. This test can also be used to check for some non-autistic or semi-autistic conditions such as social communication disorder or SCD, schizophrenia, dyssemia, and ADHD.

Some self-report social intelligence measures exist. Although easy to administer, the resulting social intelligence measures might better be interpreted in terms of social self-efficacy (that is, one's confidence in one's ability to deal with social information).

Since people with low SQ scores may not have skills necessary to communicate with customers and/or co-workers, they are most successful with minimal customer interaction, smaller groups, or independent work. People with SQs over 120 are considered socially skilled, and may work exceptionally well in jobs that involve direct contact and communication with other people.

The George Washington University Social Intelligence Test is one of the only ability measures available for assessing social intelligence. It was created in June 1928 by Dr. Thelma Hunt, a psychologist from George Washington University. It was originally proposed as a measurement of a person's capacity to deal with people and social relationships. The test assesses social abilities like observing human behavior, social situation judgement, name & face memory, and theory of mind from facial expressions. The George Washington University Social Intelligence Test revised second edition consists of these items:

- Observation of human behavior
- Recognition of the mental state of the speaker
- Memory for names and faces
- Judgment in social situations
- Sense of humor

== Differences from intelligence ==
Nicholas Humphrey points to a difference between intelligence being measured by IQ tests and social intelligence. Some autistic children are extremely intelligent because they have well-developed skills of observing and memorizing information, however they have low social intelligence. For a long time, the field was dominated by behaviorism, that is, the theory that one could understand animals, including humans, just by observing their behavior and finding correlations. But subsequent theories argue that one must consider the inner structure behavior.

== Additional views ==
Social intelligence is closely related to cognition and emotional intelligence. Research psychologists studying social cognition and social neuroscience have discovered many principles in which human social intelligence operates. Psychologists Nancy Cantor and John Kihlstrom outlined the kinds of concepts people use to make sense of their social relations (e.g., "What situation am I in?, What kind of person is this?, Who is talking to me?"), the rules they use to draw inferences ("What did he mean by that?") and plan actions ("What am I going to do about it?").

More recently, popular science writer Daniel Goleman has drawn on social neuroscience research to propose that social intelligence is made up of social awareness (including empathy, attunement, empathic accuracy, and social cognition) and social facility (including synchrony, self-presentation, influence, and concern). Goleman's research indicates that our social relationships effect our physical health, and the deeper the relationship the deeper the impact. Effects include blood flow, breathing, mood such as fatigue and depression, and weakening of the immune system.

Researcher Raymond H. Hartjen believes that intelligence is amplified by increased social interactions. This suggests that children require continuous opportunities for interpersonal experiences in order to develop a keen 'inter-personal psychology'. Traditional classrooms do not permit the interaction of complex social behavior. Instead, students in traditional settings are treated as learners who must be infused with more and more complex forms of information. The structure of schools today allows very few of these skills, critical for survival in the world, to develop. Because we so limit the development of the skills of "natural psychologist" in traditional schools, graduates enter the job market handicapped to the point of being incapable of surviving on their own. In contrast, students who have had an opportunity to develop their skills in multi-age classrooms with democratic settings rise above their less socially skilled peers. They have a good sense of self, know what they want in life and have the skills to begin their quest.

J. P. Guilford was the first researcher to approach the problem of social intelligence from the measurement viewpoint. He developed a test of social intelligence, and suggested that the social intelligence is a unit that does not depend on common intellectual factor, but relates to the comprehension of behavioral information.

== See also ==
- Civic intelligence
- Class consciousness
- Collective consciousness
- Collective intelligence
- Consciousness raising
- Emotional literacy
- Intelligence quotient
- Life skills
- People skills
- Self awareness
- Shared intentionality
- Situational awareness
- Social conscience
- Social consciousness
- Social skills
- Soft skills
