= Humanity (virtue) =

Virtue linked with basic ethics

Humanity is a virtue linked with altruistic ethics derived from the human condition. It signifies human love and compassion towards each other. Humanity differs from mere justice in that there is a level of altruism towards individuals included in humanity more so than in the fairness found in justice. That is, humanity, and the acts of love, altruism, and social intelligence are typically individual strengths while fairness is generally expanded to all. Humanity is one of six virtues that are consistent across all cultures.

The concept of "humanity" goes back to the development of "humane" or "humanist" philosophy during the Renaissance (with predecessors in 13th-century scholasticism that stressed a concept of basic human dignity inspired by Aristotelianism) and the concept of humanitarianism in the early modern period, resulting in modern notions such as "human rights".

While these theories and concepts of kindness and altruism are found within humanity, the actions of humans in general needed further study to ascertain whether or not we can apply such virtues to humanity in general or whether these ideals are only truly found in smaller numbers.

== Historical perspectives ==
=== Confucian philosophy ===
Confucius said that humanity, or "Ren" (仁), is a "love of people" stating "if you want to make a stand, help others make a stand." That is, the Confucian theory of humanity exemplifies the golden rule. It is so central to Confucian thought that it appears 58 times in the Analects. Similar to the Christian process of seeking God, Confucius teaches seeking Ren to a point of seemingly divine mastery until you are equal to, or better than, your teacher. The Confucian concept of Ren encompasses both love and altruism.

=== Greek philosophy ===
Plato and Aristotle both wrote extensively on the subject of virtues, though neither wrote about "humanity" as a virtue, despite highly valuing love and kindness, two of the strengths of humanity. Plato and Aristotle considered "courage, justice, temperance" and "generosity, wit, friendliness, truthfulness, magnificence, and greatness of soul", respectively, to be the virtues.

=== Abrahamic religion ===
Abraham is a central figure in Christianity, Islam, and Judaism.

Kindness, altruism, and love are all mentioned in the Bible. Proverbs 19:22 states that the desire of a man is his kindness. On the topic of altruism, emphasis is placed on helping strangers (Hebrews 13:1) and the biblical adage that it is better to give than to receive (Acts 20:35).

In Eastern Orthodox theology, philanthropy is understood as God's love for humanity, which human beings are called to imitate through love of neighbor and concrete service to people in need. Vantsos and Kiroudi connect this service, or diakonia, with the church's practical care for human needs over time.

In Eastern Orthodox Christian virtue ethics, Perry T. Hamalis and Aristotle Papanikolaou describe human flourishing as the progressive realization of theosis, cultivated through liturgy and ascetic practice and expressed through the virtues, especially love.

Humanity is one of Thomas Aquinas' Seven Heavenly Virtues. Beyond that, humanity was so important in some positivist Christian cultures that it was to be capitalized like God.

== Strengths of humanity ==
=== Love ===
Love has many different definitions ranging from a set of purely biological and chemical processes to a religious concept. As a character strength, love is a mutual feeling between two people characterized by attachment, comfort, and generally positive feelings. It can be broken down into three categories: love between a child and their parents, love for your friends, and romantic love. Having love as a strength is not about the capacity to love, but about being involved in a loving relationship.

Love, in the psychological sense, is most often studied in terms of attachment to others. A degree of controversy surrounds defining and researching love in this way, as it takes away the "mystery of love." Because love is mysterious, to an extent, it is most often studied in terms of attachment theory, because it can be studied in the way across ages. In infants, attachment is studied through the Strange Situation Test. Attachment to an individual, usually the mother, is determined by how distressed the infant becomes when the mother is taken out of the experimental setting. There are several models of adult attachment including the Adult Attachment Interviews and Adult Attachment Prototypes. Generally adult attachment models focus on the mental representation of the visible signs of attachment seen in infants.

Negative affect states result from lacking love. One study found that children raised in an environment that did not allow children to become attached to their preferred caregivers experienced attachment disorders. Individuals who develop securely attached have a lower likelihood of depression, high-self esteem, and less likelihood of divorce.

=== Kindness ===
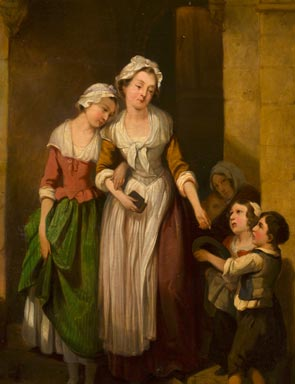
Giving alms to poor children can be considered an act of altruism or generosity.

The strength of kindness encompasses things like altruism, generosity, helpfulness and a general desire to help people: a disposition for helping humanity. The following statements are from the Values in Action (VIA) psychological assessment, which aims at measuring people's strengths in kindness: "others are just as important to me", "giving is more important than receiving", and "I care for the ungrateful as well as the grateful". Kindness, as a part of humanity, is deeply rooted in philosophical and religious traditions, each having words for the altruistic love aspect of kindness, such as agape in Greek, chesed in Hebrew, and the Latin word philantropia, the root of the word "philanthropy." Kindness is promoted through school community service programs and national programs like AmeriCorps. While gender differences in kindness are statistically significant, they are minimal, and the methods of testing used may not always have construct validity.

Kindness is most often measured by using an ad hoc metric, usually not as a trait. The Self-Report Altruism Scale and the Altruism Facet Scale for Agreeableness Measure of the Revised NEO Personality Inventory (NEO-PI-R) psychological assessment are often used to ask people how often they engage in altruistic behaviors and to gauge their concern for others. The former, however, only asks about 20 specific altruistic acts, leaving out a wide range of altruistic behaviors.

There are numerous benefits from kindness and altruism on both sides of the action. For some, the motivation to be kind comes from a place of egoistic motivation, and thus the benefit to them is the positive affect state they receive from the action. One study found that being kind develops pro-social skills in children, which positively effects their attachments and relationships. Additionally, volunteerism in the elderly has shown to lead to decreased risk of early death, and to mental health benefits. There is a difference between altruism as a trait and as an act.

=== Social intelligence ===
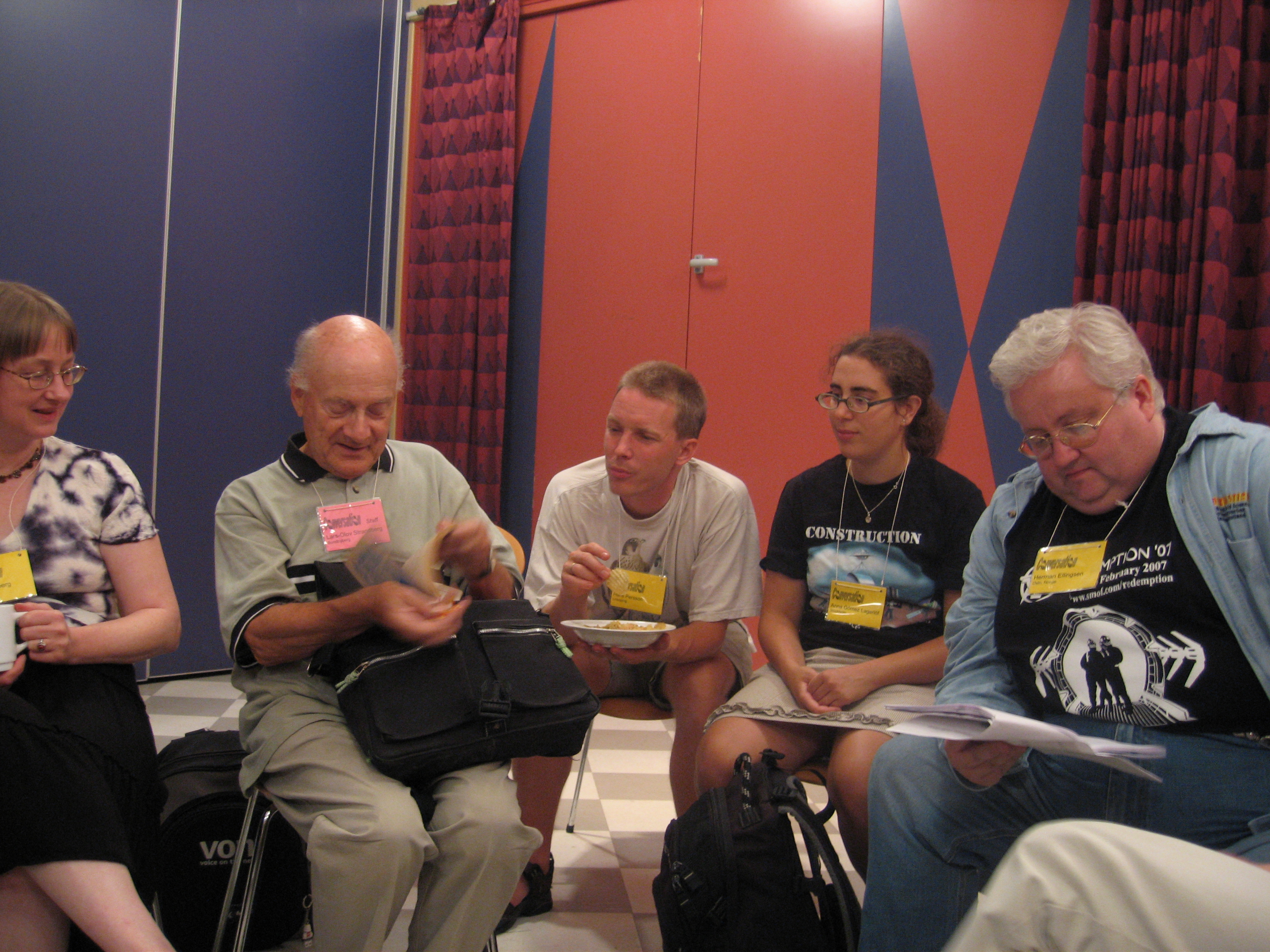
Being able to actively engage in a conversation is often considered a sign of social intelligence.

Social intelligence is the most recently discerned of the three strengths associated with humanity. The Character Strengths and Virtues (CSV) psychological assessment defines social intelligence as the ability to understand "relationships with other people, including the social relationships involved in intimacy and trust, persuasion, group membership, and political power."

Intelligence has many psychological definitions, from Weschler's intelligence to the various theories of multiple intelligences. The CSV divides intelligence into hot and cold, hot intelligence being those intelligences related to active emotional processes. People with high social intelligence are very self-aware, and are effective organizers and leaders. Additionally, it combines elements of the other two hot intelligences, personal and emotional intelligence—personal intelligence being the internal counterpart to social intelligence and emotional intelligence being the capacity to understand emotions. The CSV highlights three social intelligence measurement scales: Factor Based Social Intelligence Tasks, Psychological Mindedness Assessment Procedure, and Mayer-Salovey-Caruso Emotional Intelligence Test.

Social Intelligence research is limited. However, there is much literature on the characteristics associated with social intelligence. Zaccaro et al. found social intelligence and perceptiveness to be integral to effective leadership; that is, good leaders are "social experts." Emotional intelligence, too, plays a role in leadership. Another study found that emotional intelligence enables leaders to better understand their followers, thereby enhancing their ability to influence them.

== Psychological research on humanity as a virtue ==
=== Virtue and wellbeing ===
Although only a relatively new field of inquiry for psychological researchers, character strengths and virtues have been consistently measured in psychometric surveys and have been shown to be positively associated with psychological and subjective wellbeing. Even among those who endorse a spiritual/theistic worldview, these salutary associations appear to be better explained by humanity/civility rather than by faith in a supernatural being.
