= The Emotional Intelligence Appraisal =

Skill-based self-report and measure of emotional intelligence

The Emotional Intelligence Appraisal is a skill-based self-report and measure of emotional intelligence (EQ) developed to assess emotionally competent behavior that provides an estimate of one's emotional intelligence. Twenty-eight items are used to obtain a total EQ score and to produce four composite scale scores, corresponding to the four main skills of Daniel Goleman's model of emotional intelligence (derived by crossing the domains of the "self" and the "social" with "awareness" and "management." The Emotional Intelligence Appraisal was created in 2001 by Drs. Travis Bradberry and Jean Greaves and comes in both booklet and online format, allowing participants to choose their preferred method of test taking.

Results obtained by The Emotional Intelligence Appraisal have been compared with those from the Mayer-Salovey-Caruso Emotional Intelligence Test (MSCEIT, an EI ability based assessment of emotional intelligence based on the model first proposed by Mayer and Salovey in 1990). While the results indicated a positive correlation, this was non-significant. This suggests a distinction between the constructs being measured by these assessments. The MSEIT is ability-based whereas The Emotional Intelligence Appraisal adopts the mixed model proposed by Daniel Goleman.

== The Emotional Competencies (Goleman) model ==
The model introduced by Daniel Goleman focuses on EQ as a wide array of competencies and skills that drive leadership performance. Goleman's model outlines four main EQ constructs:

1. Self-awareness – the ability to read one's emotions and recognize their impact while using gut feelings to guide decisions.
2. Self-management – involves controlling one's emotions and impulses and adapting to changing circumstances.
3. Social awareness – the ability to sense, understand, and react to other people's emotions while comprehending social networks.
4. Relationship management – the ability to inspire, influence, and develop others while managing conflict.
