= Cognitive skill =

Intellectual capacity

Cognitive skills (Note: Also called cognitive functions, cognitive abilities, or cognitive capacities.) are skills of the mind, as opposed to other types of skills such as motor skills, social skills or life skills. Cognitive skills include literacy, self-reflection, logical reasoning, abstract thinking, critical thinking, introspection and mental arithmetic. Cognitive skills vary in processing complexity, and can range from more fundamental processes such as perception and various memory functions, to more sophisticated processes such as decision making, problem solving and metacognition.

== Specialisation of functions ==
Cognitive science has provided theories of how the brain works, and these have been of great interest to researchers who work in the empirical fields of brain science. A fundamental question is whether cognitive functions, for example visual processing and language, are autonomous modules, or to what extent the functions depend on each other. Research evidence points towards a middle position, and it is now generally accepted that there is a degree of modularity in aspects of brain organisation. In other words, cognitive skills or functions are specialised, but they also overlap or interact with each other. Deductive reasoning, on the other hand, has been shown to be related to either visual or linguistic processing, depending on the task; although there are also aspects that differ from them. All in all, research evidence does not provide strong support for classical models of cognitive psychology.

== Cognitive functioning ==
Cognitive functioning refers to a person's ability to process thoughts. It is defined as "the ability of an individual to perform the various mental activities most closely associated with learning and problem-solving. Examples include the verbal, spatial, psychomotor, and processing-speed ability." Cognition mainly refers to things like memory, speech, and the ability to learn new information. The brain is usually capable of learning new skills in the aforementioned areas, typically in early childhood, and of developing personal thoughts and beliefs about the world. Old age and disease may affect cognitive functioning, causing memory loss and trouble thinking of the right words while speaking or writing ("drawing a blank"). Multiple sclerosis (MS), for example, can eventually cause memory loss, an inability to grasp new concepts or information, and depleted verbal fluency.

Humans generally have a high capacity for cognitive functioning once born, so almost every person is capable of learning or remembering. Intelligence is tested with IQ tests and others, although these have issues with accuracy and completeness. In such tests, patients may be asked a series of questions, or to perform tasks, with each measuring a cognitive skill, such as level of consciousness, memory, awareness, problem-solving, motor skills, analytical abilities, or other similar concepts. Early childhood is when the brain is most malleable to orientate to tasks that are relevant in the person's environment.

Researchers at McGill University have led an experiment that consisted of people who weren’t diagnosed with a cognitive disorder. The study, named INHANCE (Improving Neurological Health in Aging via Neuroplasticity-based Computerized Exercise), had half the participants play BrainHQ exercises while the other half played games that were more centered towards entertainment. Acetylcholine, the chemical that triggers cognitive function, was monitored throughout this trial. It concluded that people playing the games that increased the production of this chemical had a 2.3% production, while those in the other group had no significant changes. This study concludes that cognitive function can be enhanced with brain stimulated exercises, similar to what goes on while working out.

Exercise, even at light intensity, significantly improves general cognition across all populations, with the largest cognitive gains seen from shorter interventions (1–3 months), light to moderate intensity activity.

== See also ==
- Adaptive behavior
- Adaptive functioning
- Intelligence Quotient (IQ)
- Cognition
- Cognitive Abilities Test
