= Emotional literacy =

Understanding of your and others' emotions

The term emotional literacy has often been used in parallel to, and sometimes interchangeably with, the term emotional intelligence. However, there are important differences between the two. In the early 1970s, emotional literacy was noted as part of a project that advocated for humanistic education.

== Definition ==
The term was used extensively by Claude Steiner (1997) who wrote:

"Emotional literacy is made up of 'the ability to understand your emotions, the ability to listen to others and empathise with their emotions, and the ability to express emotions productively. To be emotionally literate is to be able to handle emotions in a way that improves your personal power and improves the quality of life around you. Emotional literacy improves relationships, creates loving possibilities between people, makes co-operative work possible, and facilitates the feeling of community."

Steiner breaks emotional literacy into five parts:

1. Knowing your feelings.
2. Having a sense of empathy.
3. Learning to manage your emotions.
4. Repairing emotional problems.
5. Putting it all together: emotional interactivity.

Having its roots in counseling, it is a social definition that has interactions between people at its heart. According to Steiner emotional literacy is about understanding your feelings and those of others to facilitate relationships, including using dialogue and self-control to avoid negative arguments. The ability to be aware and read other people's feelings enables one to interact with them effectively so that powerful emotional situations can be handled in a skillful way. Steiner calls this "emotional interactivity". Steiner's model of emotional literacy is therefore primarily about dealing constructively with the emotional difficulties we experience to build a sound future. He believes that personal power can be increased and relationships transformed. The emphasis is on the individual, and as such encourages one to look inward rather than to the social setting in which an individual operates.

== British context ==
In Britain, the term emotional literacy is often used and has developed, building on the work of Steiner and Goleman as a social construction – as opposed to the more individualistic 'emotional intelligence' with the attempts to measure it as if emotions were measurable in a relatively rational way. Educators did not like the way that 'emotional intelligence' focused so much on the individual and there were clear attempts to avoid the narrow EQ tests that were in use for two reasons:

1. The idea of an EQ test had resonance with discredited psychometric measures of intelligence such as IQ tests.
2. People were also concerned with the way that pupils could be subject to even more control through the introduction of emotional intelligence into the curriculum.

The National Curriculum in England and Wales emphasized a range of cognitive skills that were controlled through exams. Educators saw the need to expand the range of skills that pupils required and were also concerned with social inclusion. The Labour Government provided an overarching rationale for this with its promotion of well-being. However, when the Department of Children, Schools and Families developed a scheme for schools – called the Social and Emotional Aspects of Learning (SEAL) – it was based on Goleman's definition of emotional intelligence. Hence any distinctions between the terms emotional intelligence and emotional literacy were blurred. Even so, key educators in Britain continued to use the term emotional literacy. Emotional literacy took on an aspect that was concern with personal growth. For example, the importance of developing relationships is, to a degree, in Weare's definition:

The ability to understand ourselves and other people, and in particular to be aware of, understand, and use information about the emotional states of ourselves and others with competence. It includes the ability to understand, express and manage our own emotions, and respond to the emotions of others, in ways that are helpful to ourselves and others.

Similarly, the organization Antidote defined emotional literacy as:

the practice of interacting with others in ways that build understanding of our own and others' emotions, then using this understanding to inform our actions.

These definitions acknowledge both the individual and other people and so inter-personal relationships and the need for dialogue are included. Sharp has taken a broad approach to emotional literacy in a Local Education Authority (LEA) where he considers its development is important for teachers as well as pupils.

However, there was still an underlying assumption about the individual and how they develop as if they were culturally isolated and separate from factors such as religion and gender. Also, the development of emotional literacy was justified by arguing that its introduction would help to improve other factors such as behavior, attendance and academic achievement. Boler researched four of the emotional programs in America. She pointed out that the programs tended to view pupils as individuals who are in need of development through enabling them to control their impulses. This can mean that pupils are to become responsible for their own control and that other social factors can be ignored. It is possible that these programs can open the way for greater control of pupils with even their emotions being assessed. On the one hand the development of emotional literacy programs can be seen as progressive, but on the other the focus seems quite inward, as there is little reference leading to any broader concept of social and political reform.

In the same way that Goleman discusses emotional intelligence educational programs, emotional literacy programs can also be more about coping with the social and political status quo in a caring, interactive and emotionally supportive environment than with any systematic attempt to move beyond it to social improvement.

== Culturally situated ==
Matthews (2006) argues against the concept of 'emotional intelligence' and for a developed definition of 'emotional literacy'. His starting point is that all social and emotional interactions take place in a cultural context and that generally all emotions are felt because of interactions with other people. He argues that a group may, for example, contain men and women and people from a range of ethnicities. One could judge a person's emotional literacy by observing what they brought to the situation, the way they interacted and the degree to which they showed empathy, and, the recognition of "self" and "others". The way that one can reliably gauge the emotional literacy of a person is to see them interacting in a group and see how they behave towards other people of different genders, sexuality and social class. Hence, it makes little sense to talk about emotional literacy of a person as if it were separate from such factors – someone may be able to empathize with people of their own sex, but not different sexualities or religions. Also, one may think that they can empathize with the other sex, or another religion, but the other person may not agree with them. Indeed, the views of other people are essential in deciding upon such factors. There is always a social context and in any context power differentials operate. Any form of paper and pen test will only give access to what a person thinks, not to the important view of how others think. For example, many men (and women) would say that they were not sexist, yet a person from the opposite sex may not agree. A person cannot tell how well they, say, empathize, only other people tell them if they are. A manager may think they are self-confident, open and friendly, but others find him or her aggressive and bullying.

Hence, according to Matthews, emotional literacy is a social process that takes place in a social setting, is something that is never really achieved, and has to be seen in conjunction with others. This indicates that key components of emotional literacy, which is a continual process, that includes dialogue, acceptance of ambiguity and the ability to reflect. Judgments are made on a person's individual-in-group emotional literacy. He argues:

Emotional literacy involves factors such as people understanding their own and others' emotional states; learning to manage their emotions and to empathize with others. It also includes the recognition that emotional literacy is both an individual development and a collective activity and is both about self-development and the building of community so that ones own sense of emotional well-being grows along with that of others, and not at their expense. Emotional literacy involves connections between people and working with their differences and similarities while being able to handle ambiguity and contradiction. It is a dynamic process through which the individual develops emotionally and involves culture and empowerment. For example, it includes understanding how the nature of social class, 'race' and gender (sexism and homophobia) impinge on peoples' emotional states to lead to an understanding of how society could change. Hence it incorporates an understanding of power exchanges between people and a challenging of power differentials.

On this view emotional literacy is developed to help people understand themselves, others and the power connections between them. Matthews links emotional literacy to equality and social justice. Emotional literacy is not just to be "nice", but also to know when to stand up for viewpoints and fight for a case. It is not about more control over people, but less. As McIntosh and Style argue schools are always involved in social, emotional and power relations, yet "power relations are a taboo subject in K-12 schooling and in the majority culture of the United States. Power relations are therefore little understood systemically. Students, however, learn about power by watching, by imitating, by avoidance of what they fear".

== In education ==
In general, most of the criticisms of courses to promote pupils' emotional development have been directed at those that develop emotional intelligence. For example, there are the courses developed in the US and Britain. The critiques of these courses include that:

1. Emotional intelligence/literacy courses can lead to more control over pupils with them being more defined in their behavior.
2. The assessment of emotional intelligence/literacy can lead to pupils being labeled as inadequate.
3. Emotional intelligence courses can locate problems in the individual that are also a function of how society is organised.
4. When courses are taught it is often assumed that pupils are emotionally ready to deal with what is on the curriculum, whereas they may not be.
5. The whole agenda of teaching emotional development can lead to pupils being seen as deficit in emotional control and so can depress their potential to have faith in future goals
6. Emotional intelligence courses have moral and ethical aspects that are not made explicit.

Matthews has tried to avoid some of the difficulties. For example, his strategies for the classroom mean that pupils only develop when, and in what areas, they are able. Emotional development between the genders has been the focus of research with a small reference to 'race'. But these are limited in strategies and do not tackle fully the critiques.

== Critique ==
Emotional intelligence is often presented as the absolute key to success in all areas of life: in school, at work, and in relationships. However, according to J. Mayer, EI is probably responsible for only 1–10% (others say 2–25%) of life's most important patterns and outcomes. The only position on which the popular and scientific concepts of emotional intelligence agree is that: emotional intelligence broadens ideas about what it means to be smart.

On the other hand, all models of emotional literacy have been criticised for the rather arbitrary addition of components to them. While there is no doubt that all of these components do affect a person's success in life and especially in their career, to present this as a scientific theory requires the establishment of some clear principle on the basis of which the concept of emotional literacy can be structured, and without this principle, the concept becomes just an arbitrary set of factors affecting a person's life.

Much personal criticism has gone to Daniel Goleman, who since the release of his first book has been accused of lacking a systematic scientific approach, not citing sources when borrowing and over-commercialising the concept of emotional intelligence.

== See also ==
- Emotional thought method
- Life skills
- People skills
- Psychological literacy
- Social intelligence
- Soft skills
- Theory of multiple intelligences
