= Sex differences in emotional intelligence =

Emotional intelligence (EI) involves using cognitive and emotional abilities to function in interpersonal relationships, social groups as well as manage one's emotional states. It consists of abilities such as social cognition, empathy and also reasoning about the emotions of others.

The literature finds women have higher emotional intelligence ability than men based on common ability tests such as the MSCEIT. Physiological measures and behavioral tests also support this finding.

== Emotional intelligence ==
Women tend to score higher than men on measures of emotional intelligence, but gender stereotypes of men and women can affect how they express emotions. The sex difference is small to moderate, somewhat inconsistent, and is often influenced by the person's motivations or social environment. Bosson et al. say "physiological measures of emotion and studies that track people in their daily lives find no consistent sex differences in the experience of emotion", which "suggests that women may amplify certain emotional expressions, or men may suppress them"..

== Tests ==
=== Mayer-Salovey-Caruso Emotional Intelligence Test (MSCEIT) ===
The Mayer-Salovey-Caruso Emotional Intelligence Test (MSCEIT) is used to get emotional intelligence IQs (EIQ). It is the most widely used test for the ability of emotional intelligence (AEI), and is well-validated. Much of the evidence for ability EI is based on the MSCEIT, partly because it was the only test available to measure EI ability. It is also the only omnibus test to measure all four branches of the EI ability model in one standardized assessment. The area scores include experiential EIQ and strategic EIQ. Experiential EIQ includes being able to recognize emotions to compare them to other sensations and their connection to the thought process. Strategic EIQ focuses on the meaning behind emotions, how emotions affect relationships, and how to manage emotions. After area scores, branch scores include four different sections: perceiving emotions, using emotions, understanding emotions, and managing emotions. Using these categories, the test analyzes people's ability to perform tasks and solve emotional problems or situations. No self-perceived assessments are used in the test; it is an objective assessment of a subject's ability to solve emotional problems.

A 2010 meta-analysis published in the Journal of Applied Psychology by researchers Dana L. Joseph and Daniel A. Newman found that women scored higher than men by around half a deviation, which amounts to 6–7 points difference.

=== Test of Emotional Intelligence (TIE) ===
The Test of Emotional Intelligence (TIE) focuses on measuring perception and comprehending emotions and the ability to use emotions and manage them. It is considered to be the Polish equivalent of the MSCEIT.

== Sex differences ==
=== Social cognition ===
Every day, people use social cognition subconsciously, as it is part of most of modern society. Social cognition is an important part of emotional Intelligence and incorporates social skills such as processing facial expressions, body language and other social stimulus.

A 2012 review published in the journal Neuropsychologia found that men were more responsive to threatening cues while women could express themselves more easily and were better at recognizing others’ emotional states. A 2014 meta-analysis of 215 study samples by researchers Ashley E. Thompson and Daniel Voyer in the journal Cognition and Emotion found that there was "a small overall advantage in favour of females on emotion recognition tasks". Two 2015 reviews published in the journal Emotion review also found that adult women are more emotionally expressive, but that the size of this gender difference varies with the social and emotional context. Researchers distinguish three factors that predict the size of gender differences in emotional expressiveness: gender-specific norms, social role and situational constraints, and emotional intensity.

=== Empathy ===
A 2014 meta-analysis, in Cognition and Emotion, found overall female advantage in non-verbal emotional recognition.

A 2014 analysis from the journal Neuroscience & Biobehavioral Reviews also found that there are sex differences in empathy from birth, growing larger with age and which remains consistent and stable across lifespan. Females, on average, were found to have higher empathy than males at all ages, and children with higher empathy regardless of gender continue to possess high empathy throughout development in life. The researchers' analysis indicated that females who viewed human suffering had higher ERP waveforms than males, an indication of greater empathetic response. Another investigation with similar brain tools such as N400 amplitudes found higher N400 in females in response to social situations which then positively correlated with self-reported empathy. Structural fMRI studies have also found that females have larger grey matter volumes in the posterior inferior frontal and anterior inferior parietal cortex areas, which have been correlated with mirror neurons indicated by the fMRI literature. The connection between emotional and cognitive empathy was also found to be stronger for women. The researchers use The Primary Caretaker Hypothesis to explain the stability of these sex differences in development. According to the hypothesis, prehistoric males did not have the same selective pressure as women and this led to sex differences in emotion recognition and empathy.

== See also ==
- Body language
- Emotional expression
- Theory of mind
- Male Warrior hypothesis
