= Reuven Bar-On =

American psychologist (born 1944)

- ראובן בר-און
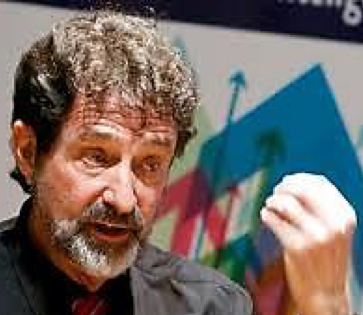
- Born: 15 May 1944 (age 82); San Diego, California, United States of America
- Occupation: Clinical psychologist
- Known for: Emotional intelligence
- Website: reuvenbaron.com

Reuven Bar-On (Hebrew: ראובן בר-און) is a psychologist and one of the leading pioneers, theorists and researchers in emotional intelligence. Bar-On introduced the concept of an "EQ" ("Emotional Quotient") to measure "emotional and social competence”, although the acronym was used earlier to describe ideas that were not associated with emotional intelligence per se. In the first copy of his doctoral dissertation, which was submitted in 1985, Bar-On proposed a quantitative approach to creating "an EQ analogous to an IQ score".

== Contributions to the field of emotional intelligence ==
Bar-On developed a conceptual and psychometric model of emotional intelligence originally referred to as "emotional and social competence" in his doctoral dissertation. Since 1982, he has been examining the ability of this model to predict various aspects of human behavior and performance. The Bar-On model is described as one of the three major models of emotional intelligence in the Encyclopedia of Applied Psychology, although other variations of these models have surfaced over the years.

=== The Bar-On concept of emotional and social intelligence ===
Bar-On created his model of emotional and social intelligence to expand psychological assessment. The focus of his doctoral research was psychological well-being. He wanted to include a wider range of contributors to behavior and performance. While working as a clinical psychologist, he became influenced by the emerging field of positive psychology and began shifting his interest from psychopathology to assessing and developing emotional intelligence which he argued is an integral part of positive psychology (in 2010).

In a review of the theoretical foundations for his model, Bar-On refers to the influence of Charles Darwin's work on the adaptive importance of emotional expression, as recorded in Darwin's 1872 publication, The Expression of the Emotions in Man and Animals.

Bar-On's conceptual model describes an array of interrelated emotional and social competencies that determine how effective individuals are at understanding and expressing themselves, understanding others and interacting with them as well as coping with daily demands and challenges. These competencies are clustered into the following five meta-factors: (1) the ability to be aware of emotions as well as to understand and express feelings; (2) the ability to understand how others feel and interact with them; (3) the ability to manage and control emotions; (4) the ability to manage change, adapt and solve problems of a personal and interpersonal nature; and (5) the ability to generate positive affect to enhance self-motivation, in order to facilitate emotionally and socially intelligent behavior. These five meta-factors comprise a total of 15 factors.

=== Bar-On's measure of emotional and social intelligence ===
In 1982, Bar-On began developing the precursor of the Bar-On Emotional Quotient Inventory™ (EQ-i™), which was designed to study and assess the emotional and social competencies he identified. The specific process involved in developing this self-report measure, how it was normed and validated as well as its psychometric properties are described elsewhere in much greater detail and by the author in numerous other publications. The 1997 published version of this assessment psychometric instrument comprises 133 items clustered into 15 scales, which loaded on the five composite scales assessing the five meta-factors described above.

The EQ-i™ was the first measure of emotional intelligence to be published by a psychological test publisher and the first such measure to be peer-reviewed in the Mental Measurement Yearbook, which described it as valid and reliable measure of the emotional intelligence concept. According to what has been posted on the publisher's website (www.mhs.com), the EQ-i™ was translated into more than 30 languages and used extensively worldwide.

In addition to the self-report measure described here, a multi-rater version – the Bar-On EQ-360™ – was developed in 2003 and also peer-reviewed in the Mental Measurement Yearbook. A youth version for children and adolescents – the Bar-On EQ-i:YV™ – was developed before that in 2000, based on the Bar-On model as well. The Bar-On EQ-i:YV™ was the first psychometric instrument to be published that was specifically designed to assess emotionally intelligent behavior in children and adolescents. In addition to being reviewed in the Mental Measurement Yearbook, it was selected by a team of psychometricians at the University of Oxford as the emotional intelligence test of choice for children, and was recommended to the British Department of Education for use in schools throughout the United Kingdom.

Bar-On's original 1997 version of the EQ-i™ was revised in 2011 by Multi-Health Systems; and the resultant EQ-i 2.0™ was released in 2012. As is the case with other assessment instruments, the revision was conducted in an effort to avoid the language from becoming dated. According to the publisher's technical manual, the EQ-i 2.0™ is described as a revised psychometric instrument based on the original Bar-On model. The manual reveals that the overall correlation between the EQ-i 2.0™ and the original EQ-i™ is .90 and that the correlations between the scales of the two versions range from .49 to .90; and based on a series of factor analyses that were conducted, the findings support, for the most part, the original 15-factor structure and the 5-meta-factor structure of the Bar-On conceptual model.

=== The predictive ability of the Bar-On model ===
Although a few scholars have questioned the construct validity of the Bar-On model, findings indicate that the Bar-On model of emotional intelligence significantly affects: (1) physical health; (2) cognitive functioning, didactic effectiveness, academic performance and career decision-making; (3) occupational performance and leadership, job satisfaction and organizational effectiveness; (4) creativity and innovative thinking; and (5) psychological health and well-being.

In addition to the validity studies referenced here as well as the reviews mentioned in the Encyclopedia of Applied Psychology and in the Mental Measurement Yearbook, other researchers have also concluded that the Bar-On model is a valid and reliable measure of emotional and social intelligence. Additionally, Bar-On has authored or co-authored more than 40 publications describing his model including its predictive ability and applicability; and these publications have been cited in thousands of other publications, including peer-reviewed articles and doctoral dissertations.

== Academic honors ==
For his contribution to the field of emotional intelligence, Bar-On was nominated for an Honorary Doctorate Degree by the University of Pretoria in 2006, received a Fellowship in the Royal Society of Arts in 2008, and was invited to present a keynote address at the 30th International Congress of Psychology, held in Cape Town in 2012.
