= People skills =

Type of interpersonal skill

People skills are patterns of behavior and behavioral interactions. Among people, it is an umbrella term for skills under three related set of abilities: personal effectiveness, interaction skills, and intercession skills. This is an area of exploration about how a person behaves and how they are perceived irrespective of their thinking and feeling. It is further elaborated as dynamics between personal ecology (cognitive, affective, physical and spiritual dimensions) and its function with other people's personality styles in numerous environments (life events, institutions, life challenges, etc.). British dictionary definition is "the ability to communicate effectively with people in a friendly way, especially in business" or personal effectiveness skills. In business, it is a connection among people in a humane level to achieve productivity.

Portland Business Journal describes people skills as:

- Ability to effectively communicate, understand, and empathize.
- Ability to interact with others respectfully and develop productive working relationship to minimize conflict and maximize rapport.
- Ability to build sincerity and trust; moderate behaviors (less impulsive) and enhance agreeableness.

== History ==
Human-relations studies emerged in the 1920s when companies became more interested in "soft skills" and interpersonal skills of employees. In organizations, improving people skills became a specialized role of the corporate trainer. By the mid-1930s, Dale Carnegie popularized people skills in How to Win Friends and Influence People and How to Stop Worrying and Start Living worldwide.

In the 1960s, US schools introduced people-skills topics and methods—often as a way to promote better self-esteem, communication and social interaction. These encompassed psychologist Thomas Gordon's "Effectiveness Training" variations as well as many other training programs. (By the 1980s, "traditional education" and a "back-to-basics" three-Rs emphasis largely pushed these programs aside, with notable exceptions.)

The first documented use of the phrase "people skills" was around 1970.

== Business impact ==
The SCANS report states that business, labor and government authorities agree that having a wide range of people skills are necessary for 20th-century work success. Skills like customer service, building effective relationships, and teamwork are among the abilities most requested by employers in job postings. Lack of these skills is considered a serious psychological handicap. Constructive leadership based companies engage in helping individuals to grow, and through that growth employees take more responsibility and discharge it effectively. This in-turn will enhance the basic attitude of the individual; and that will reflect the general level of performance in the workplace. Studies indicate that many people who have difficulty in obtaining or holding a job possess the needed technical competence but lack interpersonal competence.

Lawrence A. Appley of American Management Association, reflected on these trainings as a responsibility to "increase the knowledge, sharpen and add to the skills, improve the habits, and change the attitudes of many of those for whose development we are responsible." Lack of people skills among upper echelons (top management) can result in bullying and/or harassment, which is not uncommon in the modern workplace due to changing values. The causes that are most identified with the situation are lack of necessary motivation, communication, influencing skills and empathy gap among upper echelons (Gilbert and Thompson, 2002). Training company staff in people skills and interpersonal skills increases the morale and dignity at work (Best, 2010). Employers that do not take steps to prevent harassment can face major costs in decreased productivity, low morale, increased absenteeism and health care costs, and potential legal expenses.

== Educational importance ==
The Collaborative for Academic Social and Emotional Learning (CASEL) has identified 22 programs in the US that are especially comprehensive in social-emotional learning coverage and effective in documented impacts. UNESCO research found that young people who develop speaking/listening skills and who get to know others without WIIFM attitude have improved self-awareness, social-emotional adjustment and classroom behavior; in addition, self-destructive and violent behavior also decreased. People skills are also important for teachers in effective classroom management. Educators have found that more is needed than a degree in the field they are teaching. Knowing how to communicate and teach people instead of simply teaching their subject will help make a difference in the classroom. It is identified that 50 percent of classroom success lies in effective interpersonal relationships while the other 50 percent lies within academic skills. Requirement of people skills education is greatly emphasized within higher education and recruiters stress the required focus on this skill for securing entry-level jobs right off from campus placements. Oral communication and teamwork were ranked number 1 and 2 respectively among 15 job skills that executives and hiring managers identified as very important for new employees in a large US 2018 survey. But employers have trouble finding new employees with good oral communication because schools are not teaching the skills.

== See also ==
- Big Five personality traits
- Communication skills training
- Emotional intelligence
- Emotional literacy
- Life skills
- Social intelligence
- Social skills
