= Social skills =

Competence facilitating interaction and communication with others

Providing oral explanation about a tree for another person; a communication method

A social skill is any competence facilitating interaction and communication with others where social rules and relations are created, communicated, and changed in verbal and nonverbal ways. The process of learning these skills is called socialization. Lack of such skills can cause social awkwardness.

Interpersonal skills are actions used to effectively interact with others. Interpersonal skills relate to categories of dominance vs. submission, love vs. hate, affiliation vs. aggression, and control vs. autonomy (Leary, 1957). Positive interpersonal skills include entertainment, persuasion, active listening, showing care, delegation, hospitality and stewardship, among others. Social psychology, an academic discipline focused on research relating to social functioning, studies how interpersonal skills are learned through societal-based changes in attitude, thinking, and behavior.

== Enumeration and categorization ==
Social skills are the tools that enable people to communicate, learn, ask for help, get needs met in appropriate ways, get along with others, make friends, develop healthy relationships, protect themselves, and in general, be able to interact with the society harmoniously. Social skills build essential character traits like trustworthiness, respectfulness, responsibility, fairness, caring, and citizenship. These traits help build an internal moral compass, allowing individuals to make good choices in thinking and behavior, resulting in social competence.

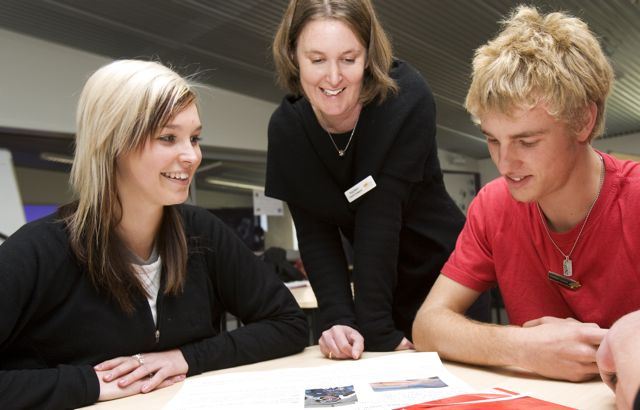
Students working with a teacher at Albany Senior High School, Auckland, New Zealand

The important social skills identified by the Employment and Training Administration are:

- Coordination – Adjusting actions in relation to others' actions.
- Mentoring – Teaching and helping others learn how to do something (e.g. being a study partner).
- Negotiation – Discussion aimed at reaching an agreement.
- Persuasion – The action or fact of persuading someone or of being persuaded to do or believe something.
- Service orientation – Actively looking for ways to evolve compassionately and grow psycho-socially with people.
- Social perceptiveness – Being aware of others' reactions and able to respond in an understanding manner.

Social skills are goal oriented with both main goals and sub-goals. For example, a workplace interaction initiated by a new employee with a senior employee will first contain a main goal. This will be to gather information, and then the sub-goal will be to establish a rapport in order to obtain the main goal. Takeo Doi in his study of consciousness distinguished this as tatemae, meaning conventions and verbal expressions and honne, meaning true motive behind the conventions.

== Causes of deficits ==
Deficits in social skills were categorized by Gresham in 1998, as failure to recognize and reflect social skills, a failure to model appropriate models, and failure to perform acceptable behavior in particular situations in relation to developmental and transitional stages. Social skill deficits are also a discouragement for children with behavioral challenges when it comes to adult adjustment.

=== Alcohol misuse ===
Social skills are often significantly impaired in people suffering from alcoholism. This is due to the neurotoxic long-term effects of alcohol misuse on the brain, especially the prefrontal cortex area of the brain. The social skills that are typically impaired by alcohol abuse, include impairments in perceiving facial emotions, prosody perception problems, and theory of mind deficits. The ability to understand humor is also often impaired in alcohol abusers. Impairments in social skills can also occur in individuals who have fetal alcohol spectrum disorders. These deficits persist throughout the affected people's lives, and may worsen over time due to the effects of aging on the brain.

=== ADHD and hyperkinetic disorder ===
People with ADHD and hyperkinetic disorder often have difficulties with social skills, such as social interaction. Approximately half of children and adolescents with ADHD will experience peer rejection, compared to 10–15 percent of non-ADHD youth. Adolescents with ADHD are less likely to develop close friendships and romantic relationships; they are usually regarded by their peers as immature or as social outcasts, with an exception for peers that have ADHD or related conditions themselves, or a high level of tolerance for such symptoms. As they begin to mature, however, it becomes easier to make such relationships. Training in social skills, behavioral modification, and medication have some beneficial effects. Poor peer relationships can contribute to major depression, criminality, school failure, and substance use disorders.

=== Autism spectrum disorder ===
Individuals with autism, including Asperger syndrome, are often characterized by their deficiency in social functioning. The concept of social skills has been questioned in terms of the autistic spectrum. In response to the needs of autistic children, Romanczyk has suggested adapting a comprehensive model of social acquisitions with behavioral modification rather than specific responses tailored for social contexts.

=== Anxiety and depression ===
Individuals with few opportunities to socialize with others often struggle with social skills. This can often create a downward spiral effect for people with mental illnesses like anxiety or depression. Due to anxiety experienced from concerns with interpersonal evaluation and fear of negative reaction by others, surfeit expectations of failure or social rejection in socialization leads to avoiding or shutting down from social interactions. Individuals who experience significant levels of social anxiety often struggle when communicating with others, and may have impaired abilities to demonstrate social cues and behaviors appropriately.

=== Anti-social behaviors ===
The authors of the book Snakes in Suits: When Psychopaths Go to Work explore psychopathy in workplace. The FBI consultants describe a five phase model of how a typical psychopath climbs to and maintains power. Many traits exhibited by these individuals include: superficial charm, insincerity, egocentricity, manipulativeness, grandiosity, lack of empathy, low agreeableness, exploitativeness, independence, rigidity, stubbornness and dictatorial tendencies. Babiak and Hare say for corporate psychopaths, success is defined as the best revenge and their problem behaviors are repeated "ad infinitum" due to little insight and their proto-emotions such as "anger, frustration, and rage" are refracted as irresistible charm. The authors note that lack of emotional literacy and moral conscience is often confused with toughness, the ability to make hard decisions, and effective crisis management. Babiak and Hare also emphasizes a reality they identified with psychopaths from studies that psychopaths are not able to be influenced by any sort of therapy.

At the University at Buffalo in New York, Emily Grijalva has investigated narcissism in business; she found there are two forms of narcissism: "vulnerable" and "grandiose". It is her finding that "moderate" level of grandiose narcissism is linked to becoming an effective manager. Grandiose narcissists are characterized as confident; they possess unshakable belief that they are superior, even when it is unwarranted. They can be charming, pompous show-offs, and can also be selfish, exploitative and entitled. Jens Lange and Jan Crusius at the University of Cologne, Germany associates "malicious-benign" envy within narcissistic social climbers in workplace. It is their finding that grandiose narcissists are less prone to low self-esteem and neuroticism and are less susceptible to the anxiety and depression that can affect vulnerable narcissists when coupled with envy. They characterize vulnerable narcissists as those who "believe they are special, and want to be seen that way–but are just not that competent, or charming." As a result, their self-esteem fluctuates a lot. They tend to be self-conscious and passive, but also prone to outbursts of potentially violent aggression if their inflated self-image is threatened." Richard Boyatzis says this is an unproductive form of expression of emotions that the person cannot share constructively, which reflects lack of appropriate skills. Eddie Brummelman, a social and behavioral scientist at the University of Amsterdam in the Netherlands and Brad Bushman at Ohio State University in Columbus says studies show that in western culture narcissism is on the rise from shifting focus on the self rather than on relationships and concludes all narcissism to be socially undesirable ("unhealthy feelings of superiority"). David Kealy at the University of British Columbia in Canada states that narcissism might aid temporarily but in the long run it is better to be true to oneself, have personal integrity, and be kind to others.

== Behavioral therapy ==
Behaviorism interprets social skills as learned behaviors that function to facilitate social reinforcement. According to Schneider & Byrne (1985), operant conditioning procedures for training social skills had the largest effect size, followed by modeling, coaching, and social cognitive techniques. Behavior analysts prefer to use the term behavioral skills to social skills. Behavioral skills training to build social and other skills is used with a variety of populations including in packages to treat addictions as in the community reinforcement approach and family training (CRAFT).

Behavioral skills training is also used for people with borderline personality disorder, depression, and developmental disabilities. Typically, behaviorists try to develop what are considered cusp skills, which are critical skills to open access to a variety of environments. The rationale for this type of approach to treatment is that people meet a variety of social problems and can reduce the stress and punishment from the encounter in a safe environment. It also addresses how they can increase reinforcement by having the correct skills.

== See also ==
- Antisocial personality disorder
- Basic interpersonal communicative skills
- Circle of Friends (disabled care)
- Dark triad
- DISCO – European Dictionary of Skills and Competences
- Emotional intelligence
- Life skills
- Metacommunicative competence
- People skills
- Social behavior
- Social cognition
- Social dynamics
- Social intelligence
- Social reality
- Social thinking
- Soft skills
