= John D. Mayer =

American psychologist

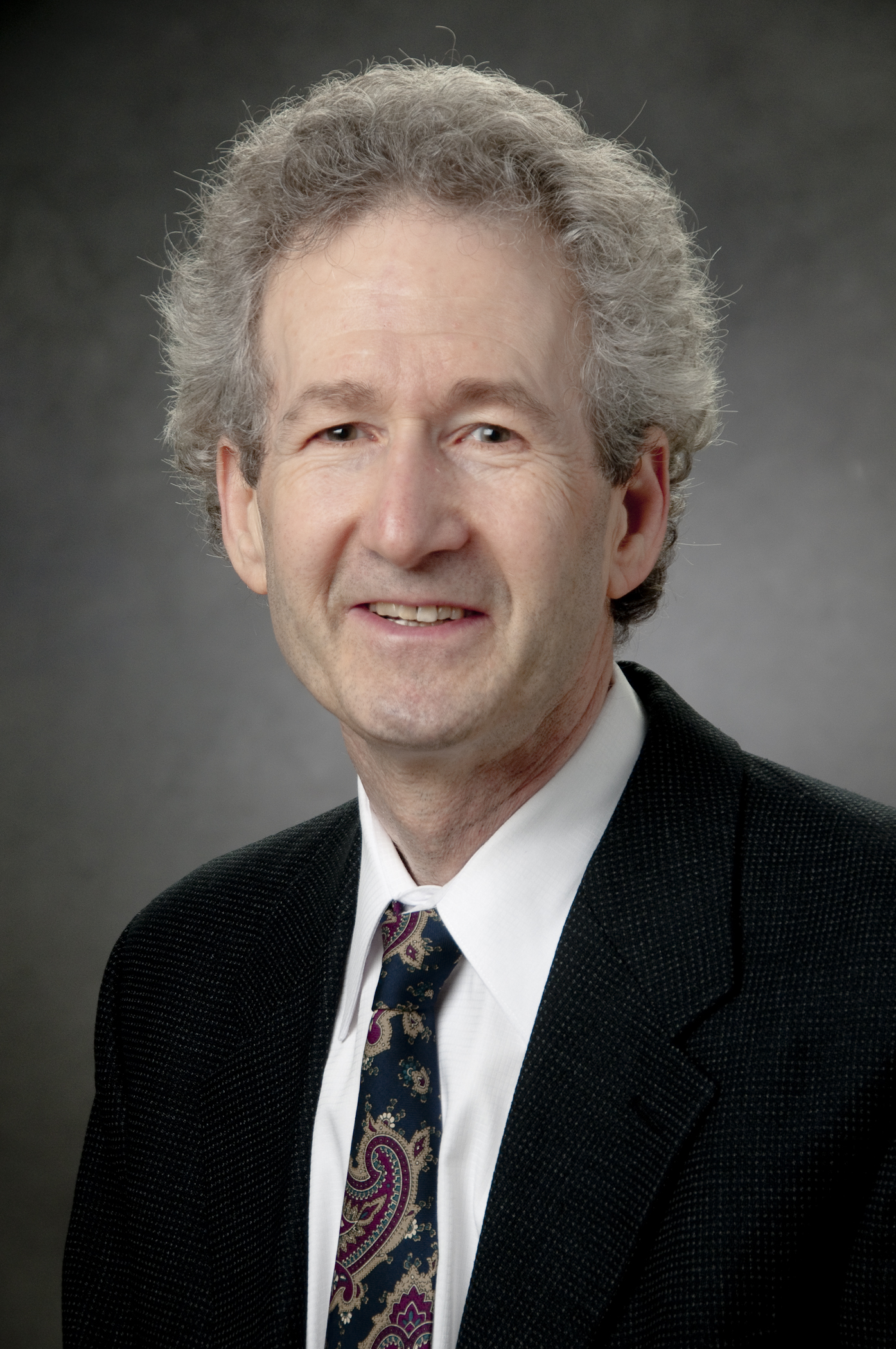
- Education: University of Michigan (BA); Case Western Reserve University (MA, PhD)
- Known for: Emotional intelligence
- Scientific career
- Workplaces: University of New Hampshire

John D. Mayer is an American psychologist at the University of New Hampshire, specializing in emotional intelligence and personality psychology. He co-developed a popular model of emotional intelligence with Peter Salovey. He is one of the authors of the Mayer-Salovey-Caruso Emotional Intelligence Test (MSCEIT), and has developed a new, integrated framework for personality psychology, known as the Systems Framework for Personality Psychology. He is the author of Personal Intelligence: The Power of Personality and How It Shapes Our Lives.

Mayer received a Bachelor of Arts with majors in creative writing and literature and drama from the University of Michigan in 1975 and a Doctor of Philosophy in psychology from Case Western Reserve University in 1982. He served as postdoctoral scholar in psychology at Stanford University from 1983 to 1985.
