= Emotional intelligence =

Capability to understand one's emotions

Emotional intelligence (EI), also known as emotional quotient (EQ), is the ability to perceive, use, understand, manage, and handle emotions. High emotional intelligence includes emotional recognition of emotions of the self and others, using emotional information to guide thinking and behavior, discerning between and labelling different feelings, and adjusting emotions to adapt to environments. This includes emotional literacy.

The term first appeared in 1964 and gained popularity in the 1995 bestselling book Emotional Intelligence by psychologist and science journalist Daniel Goleman. Researchers continue to suggest that emotional intelligence can be learned and strengthened, while others claim that it is innate.

Various models have been developed to measure EI: The trait model focuses on self-reported behavioral dispositions and perceived abilities; where the ability model focuses on an individual's ability to process emotional information and use it to navigate the social environment. Goleman's original model may now be considered a mixed model that combines what has since been modelled separately as ability EI and trait EI. The ability model defines emotional intelligence as a set of abilities related to using, understanding and managing emotions.

While some studies show that there is a correlation between high EI and positive workplace performance, there is no general consensus on the issue among psychologists, and no causal relationships have been shown. EI is typically associated with empathy, because it involves a person relating their personal experiences with those of others. Since its popularization in recent decades and links to workplace performance, methods of developing EI have become sought by people seeking to become more effective leaders. Meta-analyses have found emotional intelligence is positively associated with job performance across many different occupations.

Recent research has focused on emotion recognition, which refers to the attribution of emotional states based on observations of visual and auditory nonverbal cues. In addition, neurological studies have sought to characterize the neural mechanisms of emotional intelligence. Criticisms of EI have centered on whether EI has incremental validity over intelligence quotient (IQ) and the Big Five personality traits. Meta-analyses have found that certain measures of EI have validity even when controlling for both IQ and personality.

In less meritocratic and more corrupt societies, career success may depend relatively more on emotional intelligence (particularly in the form of social connections and personal sympathy) than on cognitive ability, aptitude, genuine expertise, and performance.

== History ==
The concept of emotional strength was introduced by Abraham Maslow in the 1950s. The term "emotional intelligence" may have first appeared in a 1964 paper by Michael Beldoch and a 1966 paper by B. Leuner.

In 1983, Howard Gardner's Frames of Mind: The Theory of Multiple Intelligences introduced the idea that traditional types of intelligence, such as IQ, fail to fully explain cognitive ability. He introduced the idea of multiple intelligences, which included both interpersonal intelligence and intrapersonal intelligence, which he respectively defined as the capacity to understand others and oneself.

The first published use of the term EQ (emotional quotient) is in an article by Keith Beasley in 1987 in the British Mensa magazine.

In 1989, Stanley Greenspan proposed a model to describe EI. The following year, Peter Salovey and John Mayer proposed another model.

The term became widely known with the publication of Daniel Goleman's 1995 book Emotional Intelligence – Why it can matter more than IQ. Goleman followed up with several similar publications that reinforce use of the term. Late in 1998, Goleman's Harvard Business Review article entitled "What Makes a Leader?" caught the attention of senior management at Johnson & Johnson's Consumer Companies. The article argued that EI comprised the skills and characteristics that drive leadership performance. Johnson & Johnson funded a study which concluded that there was a strong relationship between superior performing leaders and emotional competence, supporting theorists' suggestions that the EI is a distinguishing factor in leadership performance.

Tests measuring EI have not replaced IQ tests as a standard metric of intelligence. In later research, EI has received criticism regarding its purported role in leadership and business success.

== Definitions ==
Emotional intelligence has been defined by Peter Salovey and John Mayer as "accurately perceiving emotion, using emotions to facilitate thought, understanding emotion, and managing emotion". The concept comprises both emotional and intellectual processes.

Emotional intelligence also reflects the ability to use intelligence, empathy, and emotions to improve the understanding of interpersonal dynamics. However, substantial disagreement exists regarding the definition of EI, with respect to both terminology and operationalization. Currently, there are three main models of EI: The ability model defines EI in terms of cognitive and emotional abilities; the mixed model, introduced by Daniel Goleman, comprises a variety of emotional competencies, sometimes being regarded as a form of trait EI; the trait model defines EI as comprising traits within a personality trait theory framework.

Different models of EI have led to the development of various instruments for the assessment of the construct. While some of these measures may overlap, most researchers agree that they relate to different constructs.

== Models ==
Based on theoretical and methodological approaches, EI measures are generally in three main streams: ability-based measures (e.g. MSCEIT), self-reports of abilities measures (e.g. SREIT, SUEIT and WLEIS), and mixed-models (e.g. AES, ECI, EI questionnaire, EIS, EQ-I and GENOS), which include measures of EI and traditional social skills.

=== Ability model ===
Salovey and Mayer's define EI within the confines of the standard criteria for a new intelligence. Their initial definition of EI had been "the ability to monitor one's own and other people's emotions, to discriminate between different emotions and label them appropriately, and to use emotional information to guide thinking and behavior". They later revised the definition to "the ability to perceive emotion, integrate emotion to facilitate thought, understand emotions, and to regulate emotions to promote personal growth". After further research, their definition of EI evolved into "the capacity to reason about emotions, and of emotions, to enhance thinking. It includes the abilities to accurately perceive emotions, to access and generate emotions so as to assist thought, to understand emotions and emotional knowledge, and to reflectively regulate emotions so as to promote emotional and intellectual growth."

The ability-based model views emotions as useful sources of information that help one to make sense of and navigate the social environment, with EI abilities manifesting in adaptive behaviors. It proposes that individuals vary in their ability to process information of an emotional nature and in their ability to relate emotional processing to wider cognition.

The model proposes that Emotional intelligence includes four types of abilities:

- Perceiving emotions: the ability to detect and decipher emotions in faces, pictures, voices, and cultural artifacts, including the ability to identify one's own emotions. Perceiving emotions is a basic aspect of emotional intelligence, as it makes all other processing of emotional information possible.
- Using emotions: the ability to harness emotions to facilitate various cognitive activities, such as thinking and problem-solving. The emotionally intelligent person can capitalize fully upon his or her changing moods in order to best fit the task at hand.
- Understanding emotions: the ability to comprehend emotion language and to appreciate complicated relationships among emotions. For example, understanding emotions encompasses the ability to be sensitive to slight variations between emotions, and the ability to recognize and describe how emotions evolve over time.
- Managing emotions: the ability to regulate emotions in both ourselves and in others. The emotionally intelligent person can harness emotions, even negative ones, and manage them to achieve intended goals.

The ability EI model has been criticized for lacking face and predictive validity in the workplace. However, in terms of construct validity, ability EI tests have great advantage over self-report scales of EI because they compare individual maximal performance to standard performance scales and do not rely on individuals' endorsement of descriptive statements about themselves. Moreover, MSCEIT scores were associated with some gene candidates (COMT, HTR2A and DRD2), while self-report questionnaires were not.

==== Measurement ====
The current measure of Mayer and Salovey's model of EI, the Mayer–Salovey–Caruso Emotional Intelligence Test (MSCEIT), is based on a series of emotion-based problem-solving items. Consistent with the model's claim of EI as a type of intelligence, the test is modeled on ability-based IQ tests. By testing a person's abilities across each of the four branches of emotional intelligence, the MSCEIT generates scores for each of the branches as well as a total score.

Central to the four-branch model is the idea that EI requires attunement to social norms. Therefore, the MSCEIT is scored in a consensus fashion, with higher scores indicating higher overlap between an individual's answers and those provided by a worldwide sample of respondents. The MSCEIT can also be expert-scored so that the amount of overlap is calculated between an individual's answers and those provided by a group of 21 emotion researchers.

Although promoted as an ability test, the MSCEIT test is unlike standard IQ tests in that its items do not have objectively correct responses. Among other challenges, the consensus scoring criterion means that it is impossible to create items that only a minority of respondents can solve, because, by definition, responses are deemed emotionally "intelligent" only if the majority of the sample has endorsed them. This and other similar problems have led some cognitive ability experts to question the definition of EI as a genuine intelligence.

In a study by Føllesdal, the MSCEIT test results of 111 business leaders were compared with how their employees described their leader. It was found that there were no correlations between a leader's test results and how he or she was rated by the employees, with regard to empathy, ability to motivate, and leader effectiveness. Føllesdal also criticized the Canadian company Multi-Health Systems, which administers the test. The test contains 141 questions, but it was found after publishing the test that 19 of these did not give the expected answers. This has led Multi-Health Systems to remove answers to these 19 questions before scoring.

==== Other measurements ====
Various other specific measures also assess ability in emotional intelligence. These include:

- Diagnostic Analysis of Non-verbal Accuracy (DANVA)
- Japanese and Caucasian Brief Affect Recognition Test (JACBART)
- Situational Test of Emotional Understanding (STEU)
- Situational Test of Emotion Management (STEM).

=== Mixed model ===
The model introduced by Daniel Goleman focuses on EI as a wide array of competencies and skills, which drive leadership performance in applied settings. Goleman's model outlines five main EI constructs:

- Self-awareness – the ability to know one's emotions, strengths, weaknesses, drives, values, and goals and recognize their impact on others while using gut feelings to guide decisions
- Self-regulation – involves controlling or redirecting one's disruptive emotions and impulses and adapting to changing circumstances
- Social skill – managing relationships to get along with others
- Empathy – considering other people's feelings, especially when making decisions
- Motivation – being aware of what motivates them

Goleman includes a set of emotional competencies within each construct of EI. Emotional competencies are learned capabilities that must be developed to achieve performance. Goleman posits that individuals are born with a general emotional intelligence that determines their potential for learning emotional competencies.

==== Criticism ====
Goleman's model of EI has been criticized in the research literature as "pop psychology".

Goleman's early work has been criticized for assuming that EI is a type of intelligence or cognitive ability. Eysenck writes that Goleman's description of EI contains unsubstantiated assumptions about intelligence in general and that it even runs contrary to what researchers have come to expect when studying types of intelligence. Similarly, Locke claims that the concept of EI is a misinterpretation of the intelligence construct, and he offers an alternative interpretation: it is not another form or type of intelligence, but intelligence—the ability to grasp abstractions—applied to a particular life domain: emotions. He suggests the concept should be re-labeled and referred to as a skill.

==== Measurement ====
Two measurement tools are based on the Goleman model:

- The Emotional Competence Inventory (ECI), which was created in 1999, and the Emotional and Social Competence Inventory (ESCI), a newer edition of the ECI, which was developed in 2007. The Emotional and Social Competence – University Edition (ESCI-U) is also available. These tools, developed by Goleman and Boyatzis, provide a behavioral measure of emotional and social competencies.
- The Emotional Intelligence Appraisal, which was created in 2001 and which can be taken as a self-report or 360-degree assessment.

=== Trait model ===
Konstantinos V. Petrides proposed a conceptual distinction between the ability-based model and a trait-based model of EI, developing the latter over many years in a number of publications. Trait EI is an individual's self-perceptions of their emotional abilities – as defined by Petrides, "a constellation of emotional self-perceptions located at the lower levels of personality". This definition of EI encompasses behavioral dispositions and self-perceived abilities. It is measured by self-report, as opposed to the ability-based model which attempts to measure actual abilities, which have proven resistant to scientific measurement. Trait EI is investigated within a personality framework. An alternative label for the same construct is trait emotional self-efficacy.

The trait EI model is general and subsumes the Goleman mixed model. The conceptualization of EI as a personality trait leads to a construct that lies outside the taxonomy of human cognitive ability, distinguishing its operationalization and theory from other models.

==== Measurement ====
There are many self-report measures of EI, including the EQ-i, the Swinburne University Emotional Intelligence Test (SUEIT), and the Schutte EI model. As limited measures of trait emotional intelligence, these models do not assess intelligence, abilities, or skills. The most widely used and widely researched measure of self-report or self-schema emotional intelligence is the EQ-i 2.0. Originally known as the BarOn EQ-i, it was the first self-report measure of emotional intelligence available, and the only measure predating Goleman's bestselling book.

The Petrides model is operationalized by the Trait Emotional Intelligence Questionnaire (TEIQue), which encompasses 15 subscales organized under four factors: well-being, self-control, emotionality, and sociability. In a 2007 study, the psychometric properties of the TEIQue have been found to be normally distributed and reliable. Researchers have found TEIQue scores to be unrelated to Raven's matrices of non-verbal reasoning, which has been interpreted as support for the personality trait view of EI. TEIQue scores have also been found to be positively related to extraversion, agreeableness, openness, conscientiousness, while being inversely related to alexithymia, neuroticism. A number of quantitative genetic studies have been carried out within the trait EI model, which have revealed significant genetic effects and heritabilities for all trait EI scores. Two studies involving direct comparisons of multiple EI tests yielded favorable results for the TEIQue.

== Correlations ==
A review published in the Annual Review of Psychology in 2008 found that higher emotional intelligence is positively correlated with a number of outcomes, including social relations, academic achievement, negotiation skills, workplace social dynamics, positive perceptions by other people, health and wellbeing. It also found EI to be negatively correlated with anti-social and deviant behavior in children as well as poor health behaviors. However, once IQ is taken into account, EI does not generally result in higher grades. Additionally, subsequent research has argued that EI leads to better self awareness, decision making, and self-actualization ability.

Gender differences in EI have been observed, with women tending to score higher levels than men.

=== Bullying ===
Bullying is an abusive social interaction between peers that can include aggression, harassment, and violence. Bullying is typically repetitive and enacted by those who are in a position of power over the victim. A growing body of research illustrates an inverse correlation between bullying (both as the bully and the victim) and emotional intelligence. It also shows that emotional intelligence is a key factor in cybervictimization. EI education has been put forth as a potential method for bullying prevention and intervention initiatives.

=== Job performance ===
Cote and Miners have offered a compensatory model between EI and IQ, which posits that the association between EI and job performance becomes more positive as cognitive intelligence decreases, an idea first proposed in the context of academic performance. A 2015 meta-analysis of emotional intelligence and job performance showed correlations of r = 0.20 (for job performance and ability EI) and r = 0.29 (for job performance and mixed EI), although earlier research on EI and job performance had shown mixed results. An earlier 2011 meta-analysis found that all three models of EI "have corrected correlations ranging from 0.24 to 0.30 with job performance", the mixed and trait models "have the largest incremental validity beyond cognitive ability and the Five Factor Model", and "all three streams of EI exhibited substantial relative importance in the presence of FFM and intelligence when predicting job performance".

A 2005 study of the predictive ability of EI for job performance concluded that higher EI was associated with higher leadership effectiveness regarding achievement of organizational goals, with a 2008 study arguing that EI can be deliberately developed to enhance leadership abilities in the workplace. Emotional intelligence has also been recognised in business leadership, commercial negotiation, and dispute resolution contexts. Professional qualifications and continuous professional development have incorporated aspects of EI into their curriculum. By 2008, 147 companies and consulting firms in the U.S. had developed programmes that involved EI for training and hiring employees.

A 2006 study has found that EI correlates positively with performance in teams, strong and positive relationships with co-workers, and stress management capabilities. A 2001 article also found that employees with strong EI improve workplace performance by providing emotional support and instrumental resources needed to succeed in their roles. Joseph and Newman's 2010 study suggests that emotional perception and emotional regulation components of EI contribute to job performance under job contexts of high emotional demands. Moon and Hur's 2011 study found that the job performance-EI relationship is stronger under contexts of high emotional exhaustion or burn-out.

A 2015 article observed that there is no significant link between emotional intelligence and work attitude-behavior, though a 2006 study shows that employees high in EI show more confidence in their roles, allowing them to face demanding tasks positively. A separate 2006 study finds that employees with strong emotional intelligence dedicate more time to cultivating their rapport with supervisors, resulting in more favorable outcomes in performance evaluations compared to those with lower EI.

A 2011 study has examined a possible link between EI and entrepreneurial behaviors and success. A 2012 study suggests that EI is not necessarily a universally positive trait, finding that EI and teamwork effectiveness are negatively correlated under certain workplace scenarios.

A 2019 study by Dr Jemma King and colleagues examined whether emotional intelligence training could improve stress regulation and mission-critical performance for Australia's Special Forces operators. The randomised controlled field study found that EI-trained soldiers had significantly lower cortisol levels than controls before, during, and after simulated stress events such as live fire and rappelling exercises.

==== Criticism ====
Critics argue that the popularity of EI studies is due to media advertising, rather than objective scientific findings. F. J. Landy argues that while the commercial discussion of emotional intelligence makes expansive claims on the applied value of EI, academic discussion of EI cautions against wide claims of EI's predictive power. Landy cites the data upon which commercial claims are based are held in databases unavailable to independent researchers for reanalysis, replication, or verification. Goleman has stated that "emotional intelligence is the sine qua non of leadership". On the other hand, Mayer (1999) warns that the notion "that highly emotionally intelligent people possess an unqualified advantage in life".

It is difficult to create objective measures of emotional intelligence and demonstrate its influence on leadership as many scales are self-report measures. In review of EI constructs, ability-measures of EI fared worst (ρ = 0.04); the WLEIS (Wong–Law measure) did a bit better (ρ = 0.08); and the Bar-On measure slightly better (ρ = 0.18). However, the validity of these estimates does not include the effects of IQ or the big five personality, which correlate both with EI measures and leadership. A 2010 study analyzing the impact of EI on both job performance and leadership found that the meta-analytic validity estimates for EI dropped to zero when Big Five traits and IQ were controlled for. A separate 2010 meta-analysis showed the same result for ability EI, while finding that self-reported and trait EI measures retain a fair amount of predictive validity for job performance after controlling Big Five traits and IQ.

However, the greater predictive validity of trait EI and mixed EI measures has been attributed to their inclusion of content related to constructs of achievement motivation, self efficacy, and self-rated performance, in addition to IQ and the personality domains of neuroticism, extraversion, and conscientiousness. A 2015 meta-analysis has found that the predictive ability of mixed EI to job performance is non-existent when controlling for these factors.

In a 2009 review, John Antonakis and other authors agreed that researchers who test the relationship between EI and leadership have generally not done so using robust research designs, and that there is no strong evidence showing that EI predicts leadership outcomes when accounting for personality and IQ. A 2010 meta-analysis found that, if using data free from problems of common source and common methods, EI measures correlated only ρ = 0.11 with measures of transformational leadership. Barling, Slater, and Kelloway also support this position on transformational leadership. Antonakis has proposed an alternative "curse of emotion" argument, which asserts that leaders who are too sensitive to emotional states might have difficulty making decisions that would result in emotional labor.

There is evidence that emotional intelligence tests are subject to the social-desirability bias, resulting in inaccurate measurement, with several studies showing people can distort their responses on both self-rated and informant-rated emotional intelligence measures when instructed to.

Some studies have found that despite a positive correlation between EI and leadership effectiveness, leadership effectiveness is more heavily dependent on other factors such as their leadership activities and self-management skills.

Adam Grant warned of the common but mistaken perception of EI as a desirable moral quality rather than a skill. Grant asserted that a well-developed EI can function as a weapon for manipulating others.

=== Health ===
A 2007 meta-analysis of 44 effect sizes by Schutte et al. found that emotional intelligence was associated with better mental and physical health. Particularly, trait EI had the stronger association with mental and physical health. This was replicated in 2010 by researcher Alexandra Martins who found trait EI is a strong predictor for health after conducting a meta-analysis based on 105 effect sizes and 19,815 participants. This meta-analysis also concludes that available evidence was sufficient to support emotional intelligence as a true predictor of health An earlier study by Mayer and Salovey argued that high EI can increase one's well-being because of its role in enhancing relationships.

=== Self-esteem and drug dependence ===
A 2012 study in India cross-examined emotional intelligence, self-esteem, and marijuana dependence. Out of a sample of 200, 100 of whom were dependent on cannabis and the other 100 emotionally healthy, the dependent group scored exceptionally low on EI when compared to the control group. They also found that the dependent group also scored low on self-esteem than the control group.

Another study in 2010 examined whether or not low levels of EI had a relationship with the degree of drug and alcohol addiction in Australia. In the assessment of 103 residents in a drug rehabilitation center, they examined their EI along with other psychosocial factors in a one-month interval of treatment. They found that participants' EI scores improved as their levels of addiction lessened as part of their treatment.

=== Academic performance ===
A 2020 meta-analysis showed that students with higher emotional intelligence show higher academic performance at school. This was a summary of over 1,246 effects from 158 different studies, with a sample size of 42,529. Students with higher emotional intelligence scored higher on standardized tests and achieved higher grades. The effect was significantly larger for humanities than for science/math's areas of study, and significantly larger for ability-model emotional intelligence measures than for rating scales of emotional intelligence. The association of emotional intelligence with higher academic achievement was still significant even after considering the effect of students' Big Five personality and intelligence.

== Validity ==
The construct of emotional intelligence has been criticized within the scientific community.

=== Correlations with personality ===
Interpretations of the correlations between EI questionnaires and personality have been varied, with the trait EI view interpreting EI as a collection of personality traits. Researchers have raised concerns about the extent to which self-report EI measures correlate with established personality dimensions. Self-report EI measures and personality measures converge because they both purport to measure personality traits. Two dimensions of the Big Five stand out as most related to self-report EI: neuroticism and extraversion. People who score high on neuroticism are likely to score low on self-report EI measures.

Studies have examined the multivariate effects of personality and intelligence on EI and attempted to correct estimates for measurement error. One study showed that general intelligence, agreeableness, as well as gender could reliably predict the measure of EI ability. They gave a multiple correlation (R) of 0.81 with the MSCEIT. This result has been replicated using different inventories, finding a multiple R of 0.76; significant covariates were intelligence (standardized β = 0.39), agreeableness (standardized β = 0.54), and openness (standardized β = 0.46). A study of the Ability Emotional Intelligence Measure found similar results (multiple R = 0.69), with significant predictors being intelligence (standardized β = 0.69) and empathy (standardized β = 0.26). Antonakis and Dietz (2011b) also show how including or excluding important controls variables can fundamentally change results.

A 2011 meta-analysis found that all three models of EI have different correlations with intelligence and personality traits. A follow-up meta-analysis in 2015 further substantiated these findings, and addressed concerns about "the questionable construct validity of mixed EI measures", arguing that "mixed EI instruments assess a combination of ability EI and self-perceptions, in addition to personality and cognitive ability." A 2017 meta-analysis of 142 data sources found a very large overlap between the general factor of personality and trait EI. The overlap was so large they concluded that "The findings suggest that the general factor of personality is very similar, perhaps even synonymous, to trait EI." However, the overlap between the general factor of personality and ability EI was more moderate, with a correlation of about 0.28.

In 2021, two review papers examined the relationship between emotional intelligence and the dark triad of personality traits, finding that emotional intelligence showed negative associations with all three dark triad domains of personality.

A 2021 meta-analysis showed that emotional intelligence was positively associated with secure attachment in adults, but negatively associated with insecure attachment styles such as anxious attachment and avoidant attachment.

=== EI as a measure of conformity ===
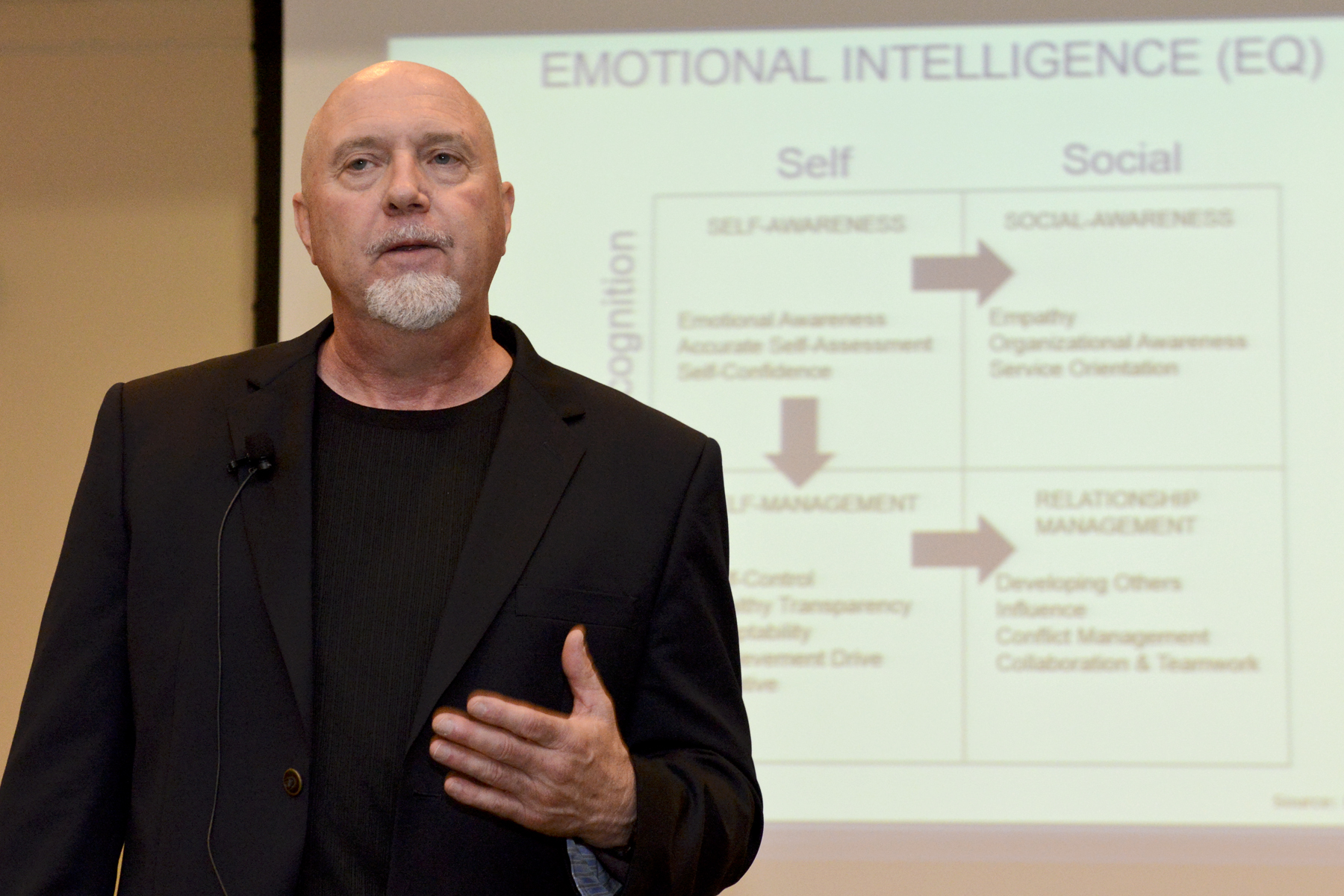
Tom Reed describes four stages of emotional intelligence: self-awareness, social consciousness, self-care and relationship management, as part of NAVAIR's "Mentoring at the Speed of Life" event

One criticism of the works of Mayer and Salovey comes from a study that suggests that the EI, as measured by the MSCEIT, may only be measuring conformity. This criticism is based on the MSCEIT's use of consensus-based assessment, and in the fact that scores on the MSCEIT are negatively distributed (meaning that its scores differentiate between people with low EI better than people with high EI).

=== EI as a form of knowledge ===
Another criticism says that in contrast with tests of cognitive ability, the MSCEIT "tests knowledge of emotions but not necessarily the ability to perform tasks that are related to the knowledge that is assessed". Knowing how to respond in an emotionally charged situation does not mean can easily carry out the same behavior in practice.

== See also ==
- Emotional literacy – Understanding of your and others' emotions
- Empathy quotient – Psychological self-report measure of empathy
- Emotional thought method – Activities to build emotional intelligence
- Four Cornerstone Model of Emotional Intelligence – Emotional model that focuses on knowledge, practical application and exploration
- Life skills – Abilities for adaptive and positive behavior
- Outline of human intelligence
- People skills – Type of interpersonal skill
- Positive psychology – Approach of psychological scientific study
- Psychological mindedness – Person's capacity for self-examination
- Religiosity and emotional intelligence – Link between religiosity and intelligence
- Soft skills – Combination of skills that enable people to navigate their environment
- Temperance (virtue) – Cardinal virtue of control over excess
- Marc Brackett – American research psychologist
- Joshua Freedman
- Anabel Jensen – American educator and author
- Carolyn Saarni – Developmental psychologist
- Claude Steiner – American psychotherapist (1935–2017)
