= John Kihlstrom =

American psychologist (born 1948)

John F. Kihlstrom
- Born: John Frederick Kihlstrom; October 24, 1948 (age 78); Norwich, New York
- Citizenship: American
- Education: Colgate University (AB, 1970) University of Pennsylvania (Ph.D., 1975)
- Known for: Research on hypnosis, the unconscious mind, and the self
- Spouses: Susan Jo Russell (m. 1975–1982) Lucy Canter (m. 1986)
- Awards: American Psychological Association Early Career Award (1979)
- Scientific career
- Fields: Cognitive psychology Social psychology
- Workplaces: University of California, Berkeley
- Thesis: The Effects of Organization and Motivation of Recall During Posthypnotic Amnesia (1975)
- Doctoral advisor: Martin T. Orne

John F. Kihlstrom (born October 24, 1948) is an American cognitive social psychologist.

== Family ==
The third child of Waldo Helge Kihlstrom (1913–1970), a Presbyterian minister, and Harriet Foster Kihlstrom (1915–2009), a secretary, John Kihlstrom was born in Norwich, New York on October 24, 1948. He was raised in Horseheads, NY, where he attended the public schools. Siblings: Dorothy Jean Myers (1938-2016) and Donald (b. 1941).

== Academia ==
Kihlstrom received his AB in Psychology from Colgate University (1970) and his PhD in Personality and Experimental Psychopathology from the University of Pennsylvania (1975).

After completing a clinical psychology internship in the Department of Psychiatry, Temple University Health Sciences Center, Kihlstrom was appointed Assistant Professor in the Department of Psychology and Social Relations (as it was then known) at Harvard University (1975-1980). He moved to the Department of Psychology at the University of Wisconsin as Associate Professor in the Department of Psychology, where he was promoted to Professor, without prefix (1980-1987). He subsequently held positions at the University of Arizona (Professor, 1987-1994), and Yale University (Professor, 1994-1997). He landed at the University of California, Berkeley (1997-2017), where he was appointed the Richard and Rhoda Goldman Professor in the Division of Undergraduate and Interdisciplinary Studies (2013-2017). He retired in 2017 as Distinguished Professor Emeritus.

As a teacher, Kihlstrom was devoted to the undergraduate curriculum, teaching the introductory psychology course every year across four decades. He also developed upper-division courses on consciousness and social cognition. In 1997, he received the Yale College-Lex Hixon '63 Award for Distinguished Teaching in the Social Sciences.

Kihlstrom served on a number of grant-review committees for the National Institute of Mental Health, and served as the Co-Chair, with Gordon H. Bower, of the Behavioral Science Task Force (1992-1995). He also served on several committees of the National Research Council, the operating arm of the National Academy of Sciences. From 1995 to 1999 he was Editor of Psychological Science, where the informal motto was "We publish the psychology that Science doesn’t"

== Research ==
Kihlstrom is known for his research on hypnosis, including posthypnotic amnesia, posthypnotic suggestion, tactile anesthesia, and the correlates of individual differences in hypnotizability. Hypnosis served as the springboard for research in other domains, including normal and pathological memory, the dissociative disorders, personality and the self, consciousness and the history of psychology. His 1987 Science article on "The Cognitive Unconscious" is regarded as a milestone in the revival of scientific interest in unconscious mental life.

== Honors ==
- 1979: Distinguished Scientific Award for Early Career Contributions to Psychology, in the area of personality, from the American Psychological Association.
- 1980: Morton Prince Award for distinguished contributions to the development of hypnosis in the science and profession of psychology from the Society for Clinical and Experimental Hypnosis and the American Board of Examiners in Psychological Hypnosis.
- 1991: Fellow of the American Association for the Advancement of Science.
- 2003: Fellow of the Society of Experimental Psychologists.
