= Peter Salovey =

American psychologist and academic (born 1958)

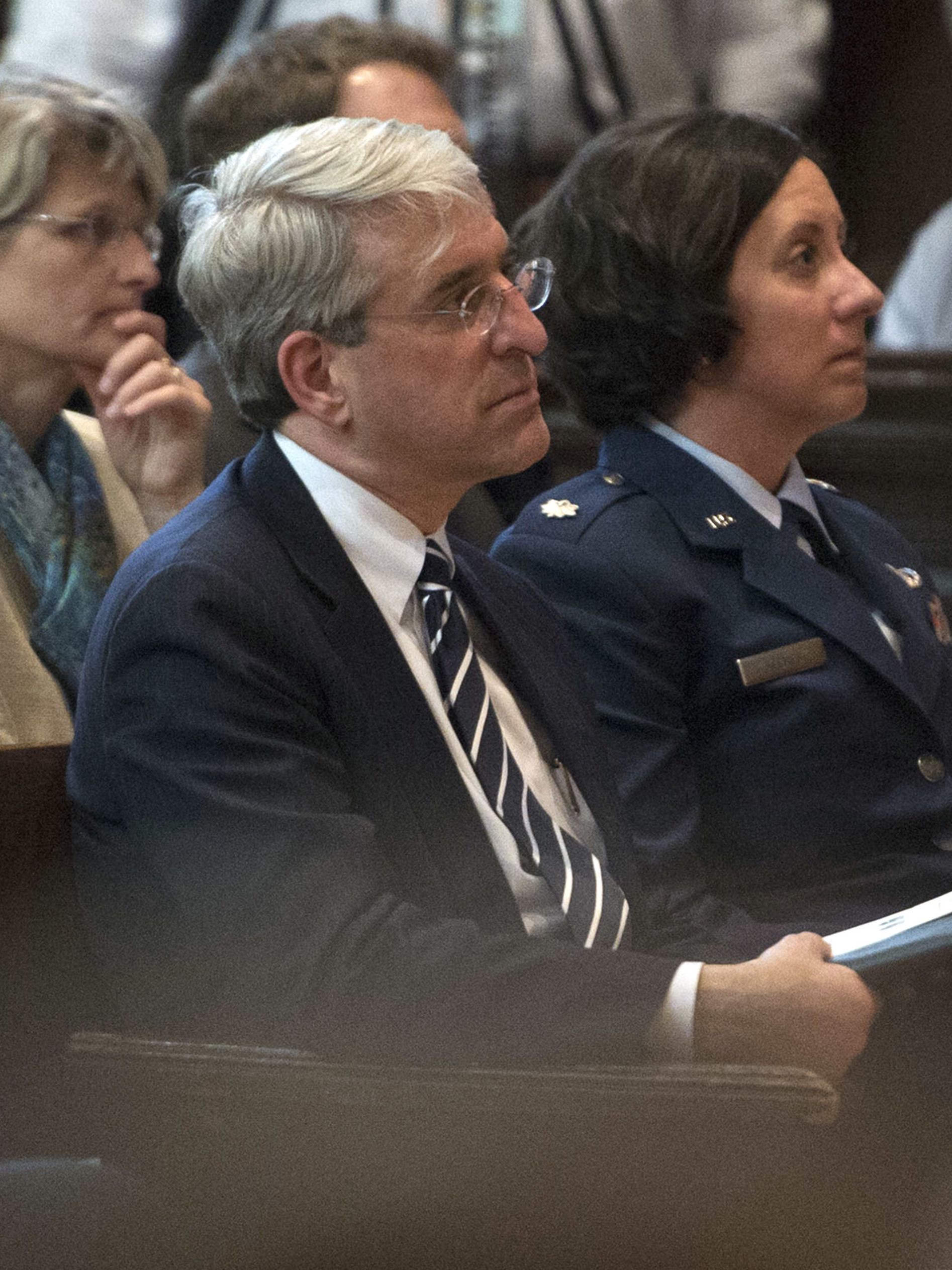
- Salovey at Yale's Reserve Officers' Training Corps Commissioning Ceremony in 2016

23rd President of Yale University
- In office 2013–2024
- Preceded by: Richard C. Levin
- Succeeded by: Maurie McInnis

Provost of Yale University
- In office October 2008 – January 2013
- Preceded by: Andrew D. Hamilton
- Succeeded by: Ben Polak

Dean of Yale College
- In office July 1, 2004 – July 1, 2008
- Preceded by: Richard H. Brodhead
- Succeeded by: Mary Miller

Personal details
- Born: February 21, 1958 (age 68) Cambridge, Massachusetts, U.S.
- Spouse: Marta Moret
- Education: Stanford University (BA, MA); Yale University (PhD)
- Scientific career
- Fields: Social psychology
- Workplaces: Yale University
- Thesis: The effects of mood and focus of attention on self-relevant thoughts and helping intention (1986)
- Doctoral advisor: Judith Rodin

Peter Salovey (/ˈsæləveɪ/; born February 21, 1958) is an American social psychologist and former academic administrator. He served as the 23rd president of Yale University from 2013 to 2024. He previously served as provost of Yale University from 2008 to 2013, dean of Yale College from 2004 to 2008, and dean of Yale Graduate School of Arts and Sciences from 2003 to 2004. He is currently Sterling Professor of Psychology, which is Yale's highest rank of professor. He holds secondary appointments as a professor in Yale's School of Management, School of Public Health, the Institution for Social and Policy Studies, as well as the Department of Sociology. Salovey is one of the early pioneers in emotional intelligence.

== Early life and education ==
Salovey was born in 1958 in Cambridge, Massachusetts to a Jewish family. He is the oldest child of Elaine Salovey, who was a registered nurse, and Ronald Salovey, who was a polymer chemist and professor of chemical engineering and materials science at the University of Southern California.

Salovey spent his early years in New Providence, New Jersey, and attended high school at Williamsville North High School in a suburb of Buffalo, New York before moving to suburban Los Angeles in 1975, when his father was appointed a professor at the University of Southern California. In 1976, he graduated co-valedictorian from Rolling Hills High School in Rolling Hills Estates, California.

He attended Stanford University, where he received a Bachelor of Arts with a major in psychology and a Master of Arts in sociology with departmental honors and university distinction. While at Stanford, he served as a peer counselor with The Bridge Peer Counseling Center, a field about which he later co-authored a textbook.

After graduating from Stanford, Salovey moved to New Haven, Connecticut, to pursue doctoral studies in psychology at Yale University under the guidance of Judith Rodin. He completed a dissertation entitled "The Effects of Mood and Focus of Attention on Self-Relevant Thoughts and Helping Intention" and an internship at the West Haven Veterans Administration Medical Center. He graduated from Yale University with a Doctor of Philosophy in 1986.

== Career ==
=== Academic research ===
After graduating with a doctorate, Salovey joined the Yale Department of Psychology as an assistant professor. He was appointed full professor in 1995 and now has secondary faculty appointments in Yale's School of Management, School of Public Health, the Department of Sociology, and the Institution for Social and Policy Studies. He is currently a Sterling Professor of Psychology having previously served as the Chris Argyris Professor of Psychology.

Salovey's most significant research contributions are in the field of emotional intelligence. With John D. Mayer he significantly expanded the scope of the concept and authored several of the field's seminal papers, arguing that people have wide ranging abilities pertaining to emotional control, reasoning, and perceptivity. Against earlier theories of intelligence that conceived of emotion as rival to reasoning, Salovey and Mayer contended that emotion could motivate productive outcomes when properly directed. Subsequently, he has worked to develop models and tests of emotional intelligence, such as the Mayer-Salovey-Caruso Emotional Intelligence Test. Salovey's second vein of research is in health psychology, where he has applied social psychology principles to investigate the efficacy of health messaging in promoting HIV risk reduction, early cancer detection, and smoking cessation. In all, Salovey has authored or edited thirteen books translated into eleven languages and published more than 350 journal articles and essays.

Outside Yale, Salovey has served on the National Science Foundation's Social Psychology Advisory Panel, the National Institute of Mental Health Behavioral Science Working Group, and the NIMH National Advisory Mental Health Council. Salovey served as President of the Society for General Psychology and Treasurer of the International Society for Research on Emotion. He was the founding editor of the Review of General Psychology and an associate editor of Emotion and Psychological Bulletin.

=== Academic administration ===
Having served in various administrative roles within the Department of Psychology for a decade, Salovey was appointed dean of the Graduate School of Arts and Sciences in January 2003. In 2004, he replaced Richard Brodhead as dean of Yale College. In October 2008, he succeeded Andrew Hamilton as provost of Yale University. As Provost, Salovey oversaw major budget reductions caused by the 2008 recession, expansion of Yale's West Campus, the formation of Yale–NUS College, reform of tenure policies for the Faculty of Arts and Sciences, and an overhaul of sexual misconduct grievance procedures.

Speculation that Salovey was being considered for the Yale presidency began nearly four years before President Rick Levin's August 2012 retirement announcement. After a nationwide search in which Salovey was widely considered to be the frontrunner, the Yale Corporation announced his selection as Yale's 23rd president in November 2012. Salovey took office on July 1, 2013.

Salovey is the first Yale president since 1986 to live in the President's House, the formal residence of the university president.

On August 31, 2023, in the 11th year of his tenure, Salovey announced that he planned to step down as President of Yale University and return to the Yale faculty on June 30, 2024. Salovey oversaw the university's response to the campus protests against the Gaza genocide, including an encampment erected outside the presidential farewell dinner and the eventual arrest of 52 pro-divestment students and local residents.

== Honors ==
In recognition of Salovey's research contributions, Salovey has received the National Science Foundation Presidential Young Investigator Award, the National Cancer Institute CIS Partner in Research Award, and the Substance Abuse and Mental Health Services Administration Excellence Award. The Division of Health Psychology (Division 38) of the American Psychological Association recognized him with its Outstanding Contributions to Health Psychology by a Senior Professional Award. He has received two awards for excellence in teaching at Yale, the William Clyde DeVane Medal and the Lex Hixon '63 Prize for Teaching Excellence in the Social Sciences.

Salovey also received honorary degrees from the University of Pretoria, Shanghai Jiao Tong University, Harvard University, McGill University, National Tsing Hua University, University of Haifa, and Vytautas Magnus University, as well as being awarded membership in the National Academy of Medicine and the American Academy of Arts and Sciences.

== Personal life ==
Salovey's grandparents' families originally came from Poland, Jerusalem, and Austria. The Saloveys are descendants of the Soloveitchik rabbinic family. His paternal grandfather, Yitzchak Leib was born in Jerusalem in 1895 to a community worker and pharmacist named Zalman Yoseph Soloveitchik (b. 1874). Zalman Yoseph was the son of Simchah (c. 1830-1921), a Lithuanian born Jew who emigrated to Jerusalem where he was called "The Londoner," due to the time he spent living in London. Simchah was the son of Eliyahu Soloveitchik, an uncle to the famous scholar Rabbi Yosef Dov Soloveitchik, known as the Beis Halevi. This part of the family has origins that trace to Kaunas (Kovno/Slobodka), Lithuania and Volozhin, Belarus.

As a freshman at Stanford, Salovey began listening to bluegrass music and learned to play banjo. In 1990, he founded the Professors of Bluegrass with Kelly Brownell, in which he plays bass. The band has a rotating membership of Yale faculty, students, and residents of New Haven, and it released its first album, "Pick or Perish," in June 2013. He served as a trustee of the International Bluegrass Music Museum and as a member of the advisory board of the Connecticut Folk Festival. He now is a trustee of the International Bluegrass Music Association Foundation for bluegrass music.

Salovey is married to Marta Elisa Moret, a 1984 graduate of the Yale School of Public Health, former Deputy Commissioner for the Connecticut Department of Social Services, and the president of Urban Policy Strategies, LLC. She is an adjunct faculty member in the Department of Public Health at Southern Connecticut State University. They met as students at Yale and married in 1986 in Orange, Connecticut.

Salovey's brother Todd is the associate artistic director of the San Diego Repertory Theatre and on the theater and dance faculty at the University of California, San Diego. His sister, Devora Farrell, is president of ThisOrganized in Passaic, New Jersey.

== Selected bibliography ==
=== Books ===
- D'Andrea, V. J., & Salovey, P. (1983). Peer counseling: Skills and perspectives. Palo Alto, CA: Science and Behavior Books.
- Rubin, Z., Peplau, L.A., & Salovey, P. (1993). Psychology. Boston: Houghton-Mifflin Co.
- Singer, J.A., & Salovey, P. (1993). The remembered self: Emotion and memory in personality. New York: Free Press.
- Mayer, J. D., Salovey, P., & Caruso, D.R. (2002). Mayer-Salovey-Caruso Emotional Intelligence Test (MSCEIT): User’s manual. Toronto, Ontario: Multi-Health Systems, Inc.
- Caruso, D. R., & Salovey, P. (2004). The emotionally intelligent manager. San Francisco: Jossey-Bass.

=== Edited volumes ===
- Reasoning, inference, and judgment in clinical psychology. (1988). eds. Turk, D. C., & Salovey, P. New York: Free Press.
- The psychology of jealousy and envy. (1991). ed. Salovey, P. New York: Guilford Press.
- Peer counseling: Skills, ethics, and perspectives. (1996). eds. D'Andrea, V.J., & Salovey, P. Palo Alto, CA: Science and Behavior Books.
- Emotional development and emotional intelligence: Implications for educators. (1997). eds. Salovey, P., & Sluyter, D. New York: Basic Books.
- At play in the fields of consciousness: Essays in honor of Jerome L. Singer. (1999). eds. Singer, J.A., & Salovey, P. Mahwah, NJ: Lawrence Erlbaum Associates.
- The wisdom in feeling: Psychological processes in emotional intelligence. (2002). eds. Feldman-Barrett, L., & Salovey, P. New York: Guilford Press.
- Key readings in the social psychology of health. (2003). eds. Salovey, P., & Rothman, A.J. Philadelphia: Psychology Press.
- Emotional intelligence: Key readings on the Mayer and Salovey model. (2004). eds. Salovey, P., Brackett, M.A., & Mayer, J.D. Port Chester, NY: Dude Press.

=== Articles ===
- Rodin, J., & Salovey, P. (1989). Health psychology. Annual Review of Psychology, 40, 533-579
- Salovey, P., & Mayer, J. D. (1990). Emotional intelligence. Imagination, Cognition and Personality, 9(3), 185–211.
- Mayer, J. D., & Salovey, P. (1993). The intelligence of emotional intelligence. Intelligence, 17(4), 433–442.
- Mayer, J. D., & Salovey, P. (1995). Emotional intelligence and the construction and regulation of feelings. Applied and Preventive Psychology, 4(3), 197–208.
- Rothman, A. J., & Salovey, P. (1997). Shaping perceptions to motivate healthy behavior: the role of message framing. Psychological Bulletin, 121(1), 3.
- Mayer, J. D., Caruso, D. R., & Salovey, P. (1999). Emotional intelligence meets traditional standards for an intelligence. Intelligence, 27(4), 267–298.
- Salovey, P., Rothman, A. J., Detweiler, J. B., & Steward, W. T. (2000). Emotional states and physical health. American Psychologist, 55(1), 110.
- Mayer, J. D., Salovey, P., Caruso, D. R., & Sitarenios, G. (2001). Emotional intelligence as a standard intelligence. Emotion, 1, 232–242.
- Lopes, P. N., Salovey, P., & Straus, R. (2003). Emotional intelligence, personality, and the perceived quality of social relationships. Personality and Individual Differences, 35(3), 641–658.
- Grewal, D. D., & Salovey, P. (2005). Feeling smart: The science of emotional intelligence. American Scientist, 93, 330–339.

Academic offices
Preceded by Rick Levin	23rd President of Yale University; 2013–2024	Succeeded by Maurie McInnis
