= Hierarchical structure of the Big Five =

Structure of the Big Five model of personality

Within personality psychology, it has become common practice to use factor analysis to derive personality traits. The Big Five model proposes that there are five basic personality traits. These traits were derived in accordance with the lexical hypothesis. These five personality traits: Extraversion, Neuroticism, Agreeableness, Conscientiousness and Openness to Experience have garnered widespread support.

The Big Five personality characteristics represent one level in a hierarchy of traits. These traits can be subdivided into collections of aspects or facets which are related to each other but are not identical. As the sub-level of a hierarchy, these traits can be said to be made up of these aspects or facets. The Big Five traits can also be combined into higher order factors consisting of two or more traits. These superordinate factors and subcomponents and the approaches used to devise them are discussed below.

== Subcomponents of the Big Five ==
=== Aspects (Big Five Aspect Scale) ===
The Big Five Aspect Scale contains 100 items and is designed to measure the Big Five personality characteristics both at the trait and aspect level. The aspect level is described as being "a level of trait organization located between facets and domains". Previous research on this topic had focused on a two-leveled hierarchy consisting of traits and facets. The authors of the article "Between facets and domains: 10 aspects of the Big Five" argued that there was evidence for an intermediary level between the Big Five and its constituent facets. The authors also cite previous research suggesting two factor solutions subsumed by each of the Big Five personality Traits.

The Big Five Aspect Scale measures the following aspects:

Neuroticism	Agreeableness	Conscientiousness	Extraversion	Openness/Intellect
Volatility	Compassion	Industriousness	Enthusiasm	Openness
Withdrawal	Politeness	Orderliness	Assertiveness	Intellect

==== Justification ====
In addition to statistical evidence presented by the creators of this scale which indicates that a two-aspect solution is appropriate for each Big Five trait, there is genetic evidence for the existence of two aspects within each of the Big Five domains including separate biological correlates. This evidence supports the idea that each trait can be broken down into exactly two distinct subcomponents, and it is this evidence that the authors cite to show that a two aspect sub-level for each trait "may represent more than mere coincidence or desire for parsimony".

=== Facets (NEO-PI-R) ===
One of the earliest facet scales is the NEO-PI-R. This scale consists of 240 questions which are designed to measure not only the Big Five personality traits, which are referred to as "domains," but also their constituent facets where "facet" refers to any personality characteristic of a lower (narrower) order than a domain. This scale is based on a "top-down approach" in which traits are viewed as broad themes that occur in personality measures. In this view traits are composed of facets, however they are not derived from lower order personality characteristics.

The approach attempts to designate facets of each domain which

- are mutually exclusive: each characteristic is assigned to a single facet.
- are similar in scope: the distinctions between facets should be comparable.
- exhaust the domain: the collection of facets within a domain should cover the contents of that domain comprehensively.
- "are consistent with existing psychological constructs."

==== Justification ====
The authors of the NEO-PI-R cite a number of reasons justifying their top-down approach. The lexical approach (bottom up) is limited for two reasons, they claim. First, not all personality characteristics are well represented in natural language. Second, personality characteristics occur at various levels of breadth, from narrow to wide, with wider characteristics taking up the majority of variance in factor analyses. These wider items tend to correlate closely with a number of narrower items while narrower items may not vary at all with each other.

A top-down approach helps to overcome both of these limitations. Items can be selected specifically to represent characteristics that are not as well represented in natural language. In addition, it allows one to develop an ordered hierarchy of items which are not necessarily related to each other "horizontally" (among items of similar breadth), by looking at their shared relationships to higher order domains or traits.

=== Facets (Abridged Big Five Dimensional Circumplex (AB5C) Approach) ===
This AB5C approach to the classification of trait adjectives uses what is called a circumplex approach. In contrast to purely hierarchical models which seek to break Big Five personality traits into aspects and facets which exist within each domain, the circumplex approach views personality characteristics as existing in multidimensional space, each dimension being represented by one of the big five domains. The AB5C uses an abridged version of this approach. Rather than representing personality characteristics in a full five dimensions, they partition this space into "subsets" which are the 10 two domain combinations that can be formed by the Big Five. Characteristics are then classified according to which subset they are most strongly associated with and placed within this two-dimensional space. This model has been described as being an approach to Big Five subcomponents which is "horizontal" rather than "vertical" or hierarchical.

==== Justification ====
The justification for circumplex models, which are characterized by the "multidimensional" approach mentioned above, is that they are better able to identify clusters of semantically related characteristics. Although the Big Five model covers a broader range of personality trait space, it is less able to make these sorts of distinctions. This is because "trait descriptors do not fit perfectly into simple structure models".

The AB5C produces different clusters of adjectives than the purely hierarchical approaches mentioned above. One proposed explanation of this is that the "external" and "internal" structure of these adjectives differ. In this case, the external structure is derived from the ratings of participants from questionnaires. Internal structure refers to the strict semantic relationships of these adjectives (as taken from dictionaries and other references). When looking at antonyms, it is often found that a word and its opposite are not in directly opposing sections of the theoretical word-space of the AB5C.

== Superordinate factors ==
In addition to levels of trait adjectives which are arranged in levels subordinate to the Big Five, there are also higher order solutions. In this case higher order solutions refer to combinations of Big Five factors which are shown to combine into "meta-traits". John Digman argued that the apparent orthogonality of the Big Five was largely due to the nature of the analysis techniques used to derive it rather than any inherent orthogonality.

=== Alpha and beta ===
Through an exploratory analysis of the Big Five literature, John Digman came up with two superordinate factors on a higher level than the Big Five. He referred to these factors as "alpha" and "beta". Alpha refers to a combination of agreeableness, conscientiousness and emotional stability (the inverse of neuroticism). Beta is a combination of extraversion and intellect/openness.

Digman suggests that Alpha may represent a social desirability factor. An alternative explanation is that Alpha is a socialization factor which is causally related to the positive (or negative) expression of these socially desirable traits. Beta, he says, may be interpreted as personal growth versus restriction. An alternative explanation offered by Digman are "communion" and "agency" for alpha and beta respectively. Here agency refers to "strivings for mastery, power, self-assertion, and self-expansion" and communion to "the urge toward community and the relinquishing of individuality".

=== Plasticity and stability ===
Colin DeYoung and colleagues have suggested that the Alpha and Beta factors might be better interpreted as "stability" and "plasticity".

He asserts that agreeableness, conscientiousness and emotional stability, the traits constituting the Alpha-factor above, are really measures of a personalities' "stability" dimension. The higher order factor stability expresses a person's general ability to maintain stable relationships, motivation and emotional states respectively. He offers that this general ability may be linked to the rostral serotonergic system which in turn has been linked to emotion and motivation regulation. Reductions in a serotonin variant in the region of the midbrain associated with this system have been linked to "aggressiveness (low Agreeableness) and impulsiveness (low Conscientiousness and low Emotional Stability)"

In turn, DeYoung characterizes Beta as a combination of positive affect (extraversion) and a general openness to exploration and experience (openness to experience). He combines these two characteristics into the more general "cognitive flexibility" which he calls plasticity. He hypothesizes links to the central dopaminergic (DA) system to which especially Extraversion had commonly been linked. In addition, extraversion and openness to experience are both linked to latent inhibition reduction which is moderated by it.

These underlying biological correlates combined with DeYoung's conceptual arguments form the foundation of his case for "stability" and "plasticity" as labels and interpretations of Digman's Alpha and Beta factors.

=== General factor of personality (GFP) ===
It has been proposed that in addition to two superordinate factors existing "above" the Big Five, that there is a higher order single factor solution. Where the two-factor superordinates are referred to as "2nd order" factors. This single factor is referred to as a "3rd order" factor, suggesting that it occupies the top of a hierarchy that can be subdivided first into two factors which can themselves be subdivided into the Big Five for a total of three levels. Proposed by Janek Musek as a blend of all socially desirable personality dimensions and referred to as "the Big One" or a "general factor of personality", evidence for this third order factor exists across a number of research studies and personality scales. Musek argued that the general factor of personality is related to self-esteem, life satisfaction, emotionality (high positive affect and low negative affect vs. low positive and high negative affect), subjective well-being and motivation (high approach and low avoidance motivation vs. low approach and high avoidance motivation).

A 2014 study of 286 undergraduate students found that "[a] composite GFP and composite measure of social-effectiveness exhibited a strong association and continued to share over 50% of their variance after controlling for socially-desirable responding."

A 2010 meta-analysis of 144,117 participants found that "GFP has a substantive component as it is related to supervisor-rated job performance." Furthermore, they found positive GFP loadings on all Big Five traits except neuroticism. A 2022 meta-analysis of personality and intelligence correlations (n = 55,169) found that the GFP correlated r = .06 with general intelligence.

In a 2008 study using monozygotic and dizygotic twins, genetic evidence was given for a general factor of personality. This work has indicated that there may be an underlying genetic component for Musek's blend of all socially desirable personality dimensions. Rushton conjectured that this highest-level personality dimension represents human evolutionary development toward "more efficient persons—those who are more level-headed, agreeable, friendly, dependable, and open."

=== Criticism of higher-order factors ===
Proponents of the Big Five and the HEXACO model of personality structure respectively have argued that the dimensions of these models are orthogonal and irreducible and that Digman's two higher-order factors are not valid. They argued that intercorrelations between personality factors of the Big Five and the HEXACO model can be explained due to lower order traits that represent blends of otherwise orthogonal factors, and that postulating higher-order factors is unnecessary. For example, interpersonal warmth blends both extraversion and agreeableness. Costa and McCrae pointed out that in an analysis of three different personality scales designed to assess five factor model traits, Digman's two-factor solution could not be replicated across these instruments. For example, in two of the scales analysed, conscientiousness loaded more strongly with extraversion and openness to experience on one factor, than with neuroticism and agreeableness on the other factor. On an adjective rating scale, openness to experience loaded nearly equally on both factors. Five factor solutions on the other hand were replicated across all three scales.

The use of factor analysis to derive verbal descriptors of human characteristics of mixed origins (biologically- and socially-based) was criticised due to the linearity of used correlations that factors are based on and for factors' independence.

A number of published studies have also argued against the existence of a general factor of personality. For example, Muncer critiqued the study by Rushton and Irwing that had claimed to find a general factor of personality based on a new analysis of Digman's data. Muncer argued that Rushton and Irwing's meta-analysis was unreliable due to heterogeneous correlations between the Big Five factors analysed. Furthermore, the extent of such heterogeneity is strong evidence against the existence of such a general factor.

More importantly, Muncer argued, evolutionary theory does not support the existence of a general factor of personality. Evolutionary theory proposes that organisms survive due to the goodness of fit between their characteristics and their environment. Humans have flourished in a diverse range of environments, yet Rushton et al.'s theory proposes that high levels of a single personality dimension have been adaptive throughout all of human evolution which would require a constant environment throughout this evolutionary period. In contrast, many other evolutionary theorists have proposed that environmental heterogeneity actually supports diversity in traits, because given traits may be adaptive in some environments and not in others.

Furthermore, there is a lack of evidence that high levels of a general factor of personality would necessarily confer reproductive advantages. For example, people with antisocial personality traits (hence a low general factor of personality) may have a higher than average number of sexual partners. Proponents of the GFP like Rushton would likely object to this by pointing at recent discontinuities in the human fitness landscape in particular. But then, further, evolutionary theory suggests that sex differences in personality traits may enhance reproductive success for each sex. Cross-cultural studies have, however, found that women tend to be higher than men on both neuroticism and agreeableness, even though selection for a unitary general factor would mean that high agreeableness would be associated with low neuroticism. Therefore, the existence of a unitary aggregate personality factor may appear to be problematic from an evolutionary perspective. On the other hand, this could be accounted for by means of the dual constraints of the aforementioned sexual selection on the one and of especially child-morality as a function of neuroticism on the other hand.
