= Life skills =

Abilities for adaptive and positive behavior

Life skills have been defined as "abilities for adaptive and positive behavior that enable humans to deal effectively with the demands and challenges of life". This concept is also termed as psychosocial competency. The subject varies greatly depending on social norms and community expectations but skills that function for well-being and aid individuals to develop into active and productive members of their communities are considered as life skills.

== Enumeration and categorization ==
The UNICEF Evaluation Office suggests that "there is no definitive list" of psychosocial skills; nevertheless UNICEF enumerates psychosocial and interpersonal skills that are generally well-being oriented, and essential alongside literacy and numeracy skills. Since it changes its meaning from culture to culture and life positions, it is considered a concept that is elastic in nature. But UNICEF acknowledges social and emotional life skills identified by Collaborative for Academic, Social and Emotional Learning (CASEL). Life skills are a product of synthesis: many skills are developed simultaneously through practice, like humor, which allows a person to feel in control of a situation and make it more manageable in perspective. It allows the person to release fears, anger, and stress & achieve a qualitative life.

For example, decision-making often involves critical thinking ("what are my options?") and values clarification ("what is important to me?"), ("How do I feel about this?"). Ultimately, the interplay between the skills is what produces powerful behavioral outcomes, especially where this approach is supported by other strategies.

=== Core skills ===
The World Health Organization in 1999 identified the following core cross-cultural areas of life skills:

- decision-making and problem-solving;
- creative thinking (see also: lateral thinking) and critical thinking;
- communication and interpersonal skills;
- self-awareness and empathy;
- assertiveness and equanimity; and
- resilience and coping with emotions and coping with stress.

UNICEF listed similar skills and related categories in its 2012 report.

=== Other examples ===
Life skills school curricula designed for K–12 often emphasize communications and practical skills needed for successful independent living as well as for developmental-disabilities/special-education students with an Individualized Education Program (IEP).

Life skills can include practical skills which depend on numeracy and literacy and are therefore denied to people who are excluded from these basic rights, such as reading signs and dialing telephone numbers. Financial literacy, substance abuse prevention, and therapeutic techniques to deal with disabilities such as autism, are also examples.

== Skills for work and life ==
Skills for work and life, known as technical and vocational education and training (TVET) comprises education, training and skills development relating to a wide range of occupational fields, production, services and livelihoods. TVET, as part of lifelong learning, can take place at secondary, post-secondary and tertiary levels, and includes work-based learning and continuing training and professional development which may lead to qualifications. TVET also includes a wide range of skills development opportunities attuned to national and local contexts. Learning to learn and the development of literacy and numeracy skills, transversal skills and citizenship skills are integral components of TVET.

== Acquisition ==
Life skills are often taught in the domain of parenting, either indirectly through the observation and experience of the child, or directly with the purpose of teaching a specific skill. Parenting itself can be considered as a set of life skills which can be taught or comes natural to a person. Educating a person in skills for dealing with pregnancy and parenting can also coincide with additional life skills development for the child and enable the parents to guide their children in adulthood.

Many life skills programs are offered when traditional family structures and healthy relationships have broken down, whether due to parental lapses, divorce, psychological disorders or due to issues with the children (such as substance abuse or other risky behavior). For example, the International Labour Organization has implemented programs teaching life skills to ex-child laborers and at-risk children in Indonesia to help them avoid and recover from the worst forms of child labour.

Globally there are various courses being run based on the World Health Organization's list supported by UNFPA. In Madhya Pradesh, India, the programme is being run with Government to teach these through Government Schools. In Afghanistan, development charity CAFOD supports life skills classes for people without literacy and numeracy skills.

== Models: behavior prevention vs. positive development ==
While certain life skills programs focus on teaching the prevention of certain behaviors, they can be relatively ineffective. Based upon their research, the Family and Youth Services Bureau, a division of the U.S. Department of Health and Human Services, advocates the theory of positive youth development (PYD) as a replacement for the less effective prevention programs. PYD focuses on the strengths of an individual as opposed to the older decrepit models which tend to focus on the "potential" weaknesses that have yet to be shown. "...life skills education, have found to be an effective psychosocial intervention strategy for promoting positive social, and mental health of adolescents which plays an important role in all aspects such as strengthening coping strategies and developing self-confidence and emotional intelligence..." For example, outdoor education programs such as Outward Bound typically aim to foster personal and social development and often measure improvement in participants' life effectiveness skills.

== See also ==
- Adulting
- Attitude
- Emotional intelligence
- Emotional literacy
- Emotional self-regulation
- Gelotology
- Hope theory
- Impermanence
- Kindness
- Empathy
- Life skills-based education
- Moral development
- People skills
- Personal boundaries
- Positive psychology
- RULER
- Social intelligence
- Social skills
- Soft skills
- Study skills
- Theory of multiple intelligences
- Vocational skills

== Sources ==
This article incorporates text from a free content work. Licensed under CC BY-SA 3.0 IGO. Text taken from Pathways of progression: linking technical and vocational education and training with post-secondary education, UNESCO, UNESCO. UNESCO.
