= Social consciousness =

Consciousness shared by individuals within a society

Social consciousness (or social awareness) is collective consciousness shared by individuals within a society.

Social consciousness is linked to the collective self-awareness and experience of collectively shared social identity. From this viewpoint, social consciousness denotes conscious awareness of being part of an interrelated community of others. The “we feeling” or the “sense of us” may be experienced in members of various cultures and social groups. By the experience of collectively shared social identity, individuals may experience social unity. Social consciousness may also stimulate working towards a common goal.

According to Karl Marx, human beings enter into certain productive, or economic, relations and these relations lead to a form of social consciousness. Marx said:

"In the social production of their life, men enter into definite relations that are indispensable and independent of their will; these relations of production correspond to a definite stage of development of their material forces of production. The sum total of these relations of production constitutes the economic structure of society — the real foundation, on which rises a legal and political superstructure and to which correspond definite forms of social consciousness. The mode of production of material life determines the social, political and intellectual life process in general. It is not the consciousness of men that determines their being, but, on the contrary, their social being that determines their consciousness."

== See also ==
- Civic intelligence – Intelligence devoted to public issues
- Class consciousness – Awareness of one's social class
- Collective consciousness – Shared beliefs and ideas in society
- Collective intelligence – Group intelligence that emerges from collective efforts
- Consciousness raising – Activism which use awareness campaigns
- Identity politics – Politics based on one's identity
- Self awareness – Capacity for introspection and individuation as a subject
- Social conscience – Sense of responsibility or concern for the problems of society
- Social intelligence – Capacity to know oneself and to know others
