= Mayer–Salovey–Caruso Emotional Intelligence Test =

Test of emotional intelligence

The Mayer–Salovey–Caruso Emotional Intelligence Test (MSCEIT) is an ability-based measure of emotional intelligence. The test was constructed by academics John D. Mayer, Peter Salovey, and David R. Caruso at Yale and the University of New Hampshire in cooperation with Multi-Health Systems Inc. The test measures emotional intelligence through a series of questions and tests the participant's ability to perceive, use, understand, and regulate emotions. Using questions based on everyday scenarios, the MSCEIT measures how well people respond to social tasks, read facial expressions, and solve emotional problems. The MSCEIT is used in corporate, educational, research, and therapeutic settings.

== Test structure ==
MSCEIT measures four aspects of emotional intelligence:

Ability	Question types	How the ability may be used	Test section
Accurately identify emotions of people and symbolized by objects in pictures	Identify and read emotions in people, landscape and designs	"Read" people's mood for feedback	Faces, pictures
Using emotions and solve problems with the emotion	Compare and match emotions to sensations such as color, light and temperature	Create the right feeling to assist in problem solving, communicate a vision, lead people	Facilitation, sensations
Understand the causes of emotion	Multiple choice emotion vocabulary (scenario presented) questions	Be able to predict how people will emotionally react	Changes, Blends
Being open to emotions and fuse emotions with thinking	Answer which emotional strategy would be best in social relationships as well as managing one's self.	Integrate emotion and thought to make effective decisions	Emotion management, Emotional relationships

== See also ==
- Emotional intelligence
