= Soft skills =

Combination of skills that enable people to navigate their environment

Soft skills, also known as power skills, common skills, essential skills, or core skills, are psychosocial skills that are generally applicable to all professions. These skills include critical thinking, problem solving, collaboration, public speaking, professional writing, teamwork, digital literacy, leadership, strategic vision, creativity, open-mindedness, professional attitude, adaptability, work ethic, career management, and intercultural fluency.

Soft skills are distinguished from hard skills, otherwise referred to as technical skills, which are specific to individual professions or occupations. The word "skill" highlights the practical function. The term is broad in its applications and scope, however, it generally encompasses a wide range of abilities, from rudimentary tasks such as kicking a ball to more complex activities such as learning to be creative. In this specific instance, the word "skill" is interpreted as the ability to master actions that are difficult to control.

== History ==
The term "soft skills" was coined by the U.S. Army in the late 1960s. It refers to any skill that does not employ the use of machinery. The military realized that many important activities were included within this category, and in fact, the social skills necessary to lead groups, motivate soldiers, and win wars were encompassed by skills they had not yet catalogued or fully studied. Since 1959, the U.S. Army has been investing a considerable amount of resources into technology-based development of training procedures. In 1968 the U.S. Army officially introduced a training doctrine known as "Systems Engineering of Training" covered in the document CON Reg 35 -100-1.

PG Whitmore cited the CON Reg 350-100-1 definition: "job-related skills involving actions affecting primarily people and paper, e.g., inspecting troops, supervising office personnel, conducting studies, preparing maintenance reports, preparing efficiency reports, designing bridge structures."

In 1972, a US Army training manual began the formal usage of the term "soft skills". At the 1972 CONARC Soft Skills Conference, Dr. Whitmore presented a report aimed at figuring out how the term "soft skills" is understood in various CONARC schools. After designing and processing a questionnaire, experts formulated a new tentative definition: "Soft skills are important job-related skills that involve little or no interaction with machines and whose application on the job is quite generalized."

They further criticized the state of the concept then as vague with a remark "in other words, those job functions about which we know a good deal are hard skills and those about which we know very little are soft skills." Another immediate study by them also concluded in a negative tone.

Psychologist Nicholas Humphrey famously stated that social intelligence, rather than qualitative intelligence, defines humans. Many industries today give prominence to the soft skills of their employees. Some companies now offer professional training of soft skills to their employees.

== Concept ==
Soft skills are personal attributes. These skills can include: language skills, cognitive or emotional empathy, time management, teamwork, and leadership traits. A definition based on review literature explains soft skills as an umbrella term for skills under three key functional elements: people skills and personal career attributes.

The importance of soft skills lies in the fact that they are not restricted to a specific field. These thinking dispositions consist of a group of abilities that can be used in every aspect of people's lives, without any need to readapt them based on the situation. Their ductility helps "people to adapt and behave positively so that they can deal effectively with the challenges of their professional and everyday life". Soft skills make people flexible in a world which keeps changing.

Interest in soft skills has increased over the years. The more research that is conducted, the more people understand the relevance of this concept. The huge amount of funds that companies and worldwide organizations are investing in the training and development of this field shows this interest. The European Commission launched the program Agenda for New Skills and Jobs in 2012 in order to train and explain this new set of skills to young adults.

In the 21st century, soft skills are a major differentiator, a sine qua non for employability and success in life. The Nobel Prize-winning economist James Heckman claims that "soft skills predict success in life, that they casually produce that success, and that programs that enhance soft skills have an important place in an effective portfolio of public policies". The significance employers give to the topic is shown by the fact that soft skills are now as important as GPA (once considered the most important factor in making decisions) in hiring a new worker.

The high request, and the broadly diffused confusion about the meaning and the training of soft skills represent two elements that can explain the lack of soft skills in the job market. Employers struggle to find leaders and worker able to keep up with the evolving job market. The problem is not limited to young people who are looking for a job, but also for actual employees. A 2019 survey by the Society for Human Resource Management found that three-quarters of employers have a hard time finding graduates with the soft skills their companies need.

=== Versus hard skills ===
Hard skills were the only skills considered necessary for employment and were generally quantifiable and measurable through educational background, work experience, or interviews. Success at work seemed to be related solely to the technical ability to complete tasks. For this reason, employers and companies used to hire new people based only on their objective competencies. This clarifies why, nowadays, people with good soft skills are in much shorter supply than workers with good hard skills.

The trend has changed in the last years, in part due to more businesses adopting a hybrid work environment. Hard skills still represent a fundamental aspect, but soft skills equaled them for importance. According to the leadership professor Robert Lavasseur, most of the researchers he interviewed in this field "rated soft skills higher than technical skills".

In employment sectors that have seen rapid growth, employers have stated that newly graduated employees possess a skill gap. This skill gap resides between soft and hard skills, these newly graduated employees possess the hard skills required and expected, but are lacking the soft skills. Research shows the effect of poorer soft skills on life outcomes, and how improving these can fill skills gaps or increase individuals' own life circumstances.

=== Measurement ===
Studies by the OECD in 2015 suggested soft skills can be meaningfully measured within cultural and linguistic boundaries. Such measures include a combination of methods that include self-reported personality, behavioural surveys and objective psychological assessments. These measurements can be improved by collecting data from multiple sources across learning contexts such as the school environment, family context and the wider community and triangulating the data (OECD, 2015).

This is because surveys can be subject to bias, and having multiple sources such as self, teacher, peer and parental reporting can provide unique perspectives on student's skills as well as infer latent personality (John and De Fruyt, 2014). In addition, anchoring vignettes is another method that can be implemented to lessen biases and increase data quality as well as improve cross-cultural comparability of soft skill assessments (King, Murray, Salomon, and Tandon, 2003; Kyllonen and Bertling, 2014). Frameworks have been developed to measure and progress in essential soft skills, such as the Universal Framework for Essential Skills.

== Education ==
Because of their rising importance, the need to teach soft skills has become a major concern for educators and employers all over the world. Because soft skills are poorly defined, teaching them is more challenging, compared to classical skills. For this reason, the first step consists of understanding how to evaluate them, so that educators can track student progress.

As for teaching, evaluating soft skills is harder than technical skills. "Quizzes or exams cannot accurately measure interpersonal and leadership skills". Group projects seem to be a good way to develop soft skills, but evaluating them still represents a hard obstacle. Researchers consider peer evaluation a good compromise between working in groups and an objective evaluation. The researches conducted on this topic reported both positive and negative results. The study carried out by professor Zhang of Georgia Southern University, although with few participants, "is an initial step in designing and validating a peer assessment scale".

"The development of soft skills is much more difficult than the development of hard skills because it requires actively interacting with others on an ongoing basis and being willing to accept behavioral feedback". While hard skills can be learned studying from a book or from individual training, soft skills needs a combination of environment and other people to be mastered. For this reason, learning doesn't depend solely on the person, but it is influenced by different factors that make the education harder and unpredictable.

Training transfer, "defined as the extent to which what is learned in training is applied on the job and enhances job-related performance", is another reason why the education of soft skills is hard. "Prior research and anecdotal evidence has emphasized that soft-skills training is significantly less likely to transfer from training to job than hard-skills training". This forces companies and organizations to invest more money and time in training, and not all are willing to do it.

The OECD ‘'Future of Education and Skills 2030’' report released in 2019 highlighted the growing importance of soft skills in education due to trends such as globalization and rapid advancements in technology and artificial intelligence, which demand changes of the labor market and the skills future workers require in order to succeed. It says, "to remain competitive, workers will need to acquire new skills continually, which requires flexibility, a positive attitude towards lifelong learning and curiosity".

Research has been conducted investigating the transfer of soft skills and knowledge through formats such as play (DeKorver, Choi and Town, 2017) as well as project-based learning (Lee and Tsai, 2004). Another key finding from the literature is that in order to maximize benefits of soft skills over the long-term, they should be focused on young children particularly from the age of 1 – 9 years old. Nobel prize winners Heckman and Kautz (2012) provided evidence of this in their analysis of the Perry Preschool Soft Skills program, where they found how personality traits can be changed in ways that produce beneficial life outcomes. The program involved teaching social skills to 3 and 4-year-old children from low income black families with initial IQ scores below 85 at age 3. 128 children participated in the four year high-quality preschool education program which emphasized active learning. The children were involved in activities designed to develop their decision making and problem solving skills and that were planned, executed and reviewed by the children themselves with support from adults. Teachers also paid weekly 1.5 hour visits to each student's home to involve the mother in the educational process and help implement the preschool curriculum at home.

This longitudinal study was evaluated using randomized controlled trials (RCT). It was found that the group which experienced the enrichment preschool program compared to the control group which didn't participate had significantly more positive life outcomes than their peers by the age of 40. This included that 60% of the program group earned more per year (over US$20,000) as compared to the 40% that the non-program group. In addition, 77% of the program group graduated high school whereas only 60% of the non-program group graduated. Other life outcomes included program school participants were less likely to get arrested, owned their own home and car and had fewer teenage pregnancies (Heckman and Kautz, 2012). Evidence from other studies are consistent with the findings from the Perry Preschool Program, such as data from Project STAR (Student/Teacher Achievement Ratio) carried out by Krueger and Whitmore (2001) and Project PATHS (Promoting Alternative Thinking Strategies) that teaches self-control, emotional awareness and social-problem skills aimed at elementary school children (Bierman et al., 2010). Both studies have found implementing soft skills education to small groups of children at a young age have led to significantly higher wages in early adulthood compared to their peers and other lifetime successes (Dee and West, 2011; Durlak et al., 2011).

IBM SkillsBuild has soft skills training courses.

=== Metacognition ===
The same OECD report emphasized the importance of metacognitive skills for lifelong learning. Metacognition amounts to thinking about one's thinking. More specifically, it refers to the processes used to assess one's understanding. It includes critical thinking, reflection, and awareness of oneself as a thinker and a learner (Chick, 2013). With increasing automation, purely cognitive or professional skills no longer suffice to navigate this volatile, uncertain, complex, and ambiguous world.(Yeo, 2019, OECD 2015.)

== Employment ==
According to the OECD's Skills Outlook 2019 report, life-long learning or metacognition, is becoming more necessary for employment and for handling a future environment of increased uncertainty. The report states, ‘humans are likely to be able to handle uncertainty better than AI,’ as an artificial intelligence can complete specific tasks efficiently, but cannot be easily programmed to account for the uncertainty and unexpected complexity encountered in working with humans or for human customers. Put another way, soft skills are very difficult to code. In contrast, humans can respond more readily to uncertainty, volatility, complexity, and ambiguity, through being adaptable learners and being able to readily adopt, develop, and discard their beliefs and their understanding of the world, when given a new context (OECD, 2019). That said, humans sometimes fail to adapt productively, and machines, in many cases, lack those capacities entirely (Laukkonen, Biddell and Gallagher, 2018).

== Criticism ==
While "soft skills" have become increasingly taught in educational programs worldwide, some scholars have shown the inconsistent usage of the term, as well as the ways it is used to control, rather than empower, employees. Deborah Cameron, for example, shows that the growing focus on "communication" skills among service providers in the UK has limited workers' forms of expression and produced uniform conversational codes. Kori Allan demonstrates that state-run integration programs for new immigrants in Canada, employ the focus on soft skills so that individuals adopt the interpersonal cultural norms of Canadian society.

Similarly, critical labour studies highlight that linguistic and communicative competences are crucial for labour market functioning and hard to automate, yet they remain unequally and often undervalued in terms of salary and recognition. They are socially undervalued because of their association with feminised activities, ethnicity, and low-status service jobs.

In China, the Ministry of Education has sought to promote students' self-expression and communicational skills at the expense of exam-driven learning, yet the difficulty in measuring these abilities, and moreover the fact that these abilities are more easily identified among the urban elite rather than democratically accessible, has curtailed much of these efforts. As Gil Hizi shows, rather than being treated as objectively recognized abilities necessary for the job market, people in China who foster soft skills regard themselves as becoming more individualistic and cosmopolitan in contrast to the demands of their local culture.

== See also ==
- Basic interpersonal communicative skills
- DISCO - European Dictionary of Skills and Competences
- Empathy
- Life skills
- Theory of multiple intelligences
- 21st century skills
- Vocational skills
