= Pathways Out of Poverty =

American workforce development program

Pathways Out of Poverty (POP) is an American workforce development program that was established on August 14, 2009 by the Obama administration and funded by the American Recovery and Reinvestment Act (ARRA) of 2009. The Department of Labor's Employment and Training Administration announced POP grantees on January 13, 2010. POP targets individuals living below or near the poverty level to provide them with skills needed to enter the green job market, focusing on the energy efficiency and renewable energy industries. The training programs focus on teaching basic literacy and job readiness skills. Some of the programs also provide supportive assistance with childcare and transportation to overcome barriers to employment.

== History ==
Pathways Out of Poverty is administered by the United States Department of Labor’s Employment and Training Administration. Roughly $150 million is authorized by the ARRA and is granted in amounts from $2 million-$8 million to eight national and 30 local entities for the provision of training and placement services in order “to provide pathways out of poverty and into employment.” The Department of Labor particularly encouraged applicants to focus on serving Public Micro Data Areas (PUMAs) with poverty rates of 15 percent or higher.

Pathways Out of Poverty is part of the "fourth wave" of economic development, which stipulates an environmentally-sustainable approach.

A principal condition of POP is the training of disadvantaged populations for “employment within energy efficiency and renewable energy industries.” This type of employment is sometimes known as "green jobs" or "green-collar" jobs. As mandated by the POP grant, the grantees primarily target low income individuals, veterans, at-risk youth, high school dropouts, the unemployed and underemployed, ex-criminals, and individuals with limited English ability. In addition, some grantees report recruiting public assistance recipients, the homeless, people with disabilities, older workers, women, minorities, and refugees.

Each grantee is free to choose and make partnerships with any organization, including public, private, and not-for-profit. Some examples of partners include community colleges, technical schools, faith-based organizations, community-based organizations, and trade groups.

== Grantees ==
The Department of Labor's Employment and Training Administration announced the 38 national and local organizations that would be receiving grants on January 13, 2010. The grantees for Pathways Out of Poverty (POP) consist of two types: (1) national non-profits that are connected with local organizations; and (2) local public organizations and private non-profits.

There are eight national grantees:

Organization	Locations	Award Amount	Participants Served
East Harlem Employment Services Inc.	New York, NY; Philadelphia, PA; Hartford, CT; Benton, MI; Flint, MI; Baltimore, MD	$4,728,419	Unemployed individuals, high school dropouts, and individuals with criminal records
Goodwill Industries International (GII)	Atlanta, GA; Austin, TX; Charlotte, NC; Grand Rapids, MI; Phoenix, AZ; Washington, D.C.	$7,303,634	People with disabilities, chronically unemployed individuals, ex-offenders, older workers, homeless individuals, and high school dropouts
Jobs for the Future Inc. (JFF)	Chicago, IL; Detroit, MI; Los Angeles, CA; Milwaukee, WI; Philadelphia, PA	$7,997,936	Unemployed and disadvantaged individuals
MDC Inc.	Charlotte, NC; North Charleston, SC; Orangeburg, Calhoun, and Bamberg Counties, SC; Wise and Dickenson Counties, VA; Scott County, VA	$3,780,816	Low-wage workers and unemployed individuals
National Association of Regional Councils (NARC)	Apache Junction, AZ; Bisbee, AZ; Midland, TX; Odessa, TX; Dayton, OH	$7,994,999	Limited English proficiency individuals, Native Americans, and ex-offenders
National Council of La Raza	San Jose, CA; San Diego, CA; Chicago, IL	$3,063,839	Low-income and unemployed individuals and individuals with limited English proficiency
Opportunities Industrialization Centers of America Inc.	Asheville, NC; Broward County, FL; Phoenix, AZ	$4,900,000	Unemployed individuals, high school dropouts, and individuals with criminal records
PathStone Corp.	Rochester, NY; Scranton, PA; Juana Diaz, Santa Isabel, and Villalba, PR; and Arroyo, Coamo, Guayama, and Salinas, PR	$8,000,000	Unemployed individuals, high school dropouts, and individuals with criminal records

There are thirty local grantees:

Organization	Locations	Award Amount	Participants Served
Alternative Opportunities Inc.	St. Louis, MO	$2,308,200	High school dropouts, unemployed individuals, ex-offenders, and veterans
Better Family Life Inc. (BFL)	St. Louis, MO	$3,305,493	Unemployed individuals, high school dropouts, and individuals with criminal records
Boley Centers Inc.	St. Petersburg, FL	$2,300,678	Disadvantaged and unemployed urban youth
Citrus Levy Marion Regional Workforce Development Board Inc.	Ocala, FL	$2,985,175	Unemployed workers, low-income adults, high school dropouts, and individuals with a criminal history
City of Minneapolis	Minneapolis and St. Paul, MN	$4,000,000	Individuals living in poverty, veterans, and unemployed young adults who do not have high school diplomas
CNY Works Inc.	Syracuse, NY	$3,715,931	Low income individuals, ex-offenders, disadvantaged young adults, and displaced workers
Community College of Philadelphia	Philadelphia, PA	$3,184,428	Unemployed workers, ex-offenders, and veterans
Consortium for Worker Education	Bronx, NY	$4,000,000	Individuals with limited English proficiency, veterans and eligible spouses, persons with criminal records, and Disconnected Youth and women
Eastern Maine Development Corp.	Piscataquis County and Penobscot County, ME	$2,109,088	Disadvantaged adult job seekers, dislocated workers, returning offenders, public assistance recipients, high school dropouts, and veterans
Florida State College at Jacksonville	Duval County, FL	$2,229,642	Unemployed individuals, high school dropouts, and individuals with criminal records
Grand Rapids Community College	Grand Rapids, MI	$4,000,000	Unemployed workers, high school dropouts, and individuals with criminal records
It's My Community Initiative	Oklahoma City, OK	$4,000,000	Underemployed individuals and ex-offenders
Lehigh Valley Workforce Investment Board, Inc.	Allentown, PA	$4,000,000	At-risk youth, veterans and eligible spouses, and underemployed and unemployed individuals
Los Angeles Community College District (LACCD)	Los Angeles, CA, communities of Watts	$4,000,000	Dislocated, unemployed, underemployed, low-income workers and veterans
Mi Casa Resource Center	Denver, CO	$3,633,195	Unemployed individuals, high school dropouts, individuals with a criminal record, women, and minorities
Mott Community College(MCC)	Flint, MI and adjoining suburbs	$3,662,403	Low-income individuals
Mountrie Technical College	Tift County, GA	$3,753,579	Individuals on probation, high school dropouts, residents with disadvantaged backgrounds, and displaced workers
Northern Rural Training and Employment Consortium (NoRTEC)	Butte, CA; Del Norte, Lassen, Modoc, and Siskiyou, CA; Shasta County, CA; Tehama and Trinity, CA	$4,000,000	High school dropouts, at-risk youth, welfare recipients, individuals with criminal records, unemployed and dislocated workers, and veterans
Private Industry Council of Westmoreland/Fayette Inc.	Fayette County, PA	$2,732,719	Unemployed individuals, high school dropouts, and individuals with criminal records
Providence Economic Development Partnership	Providence, RI	$2,489,111	Ex-offenders and low-literacy individuals
Roca Inc.	Chelsea and Revere, MA	$2,398,778	High-risk youth
SER - Jobs for Progress of the Texas Gulf Coast Inc.	Houston, TX	$3,122,554	High school dropouts, ex-offenders, unemployed individuals, and disadvantaged individuals
Southeast Community College Area	Lincoln, NE	$2,331,278	Unemployed individuals, veterans, high school dropouts, individuals with criminal records, refugees, and immigrants
Southwest Housing Solutions Corp. (SWHS)	Southwest Detroit, MI	$4,000,000	Unemployed individuals, high school dropouts, individuals with a criminal record, and veterans
West Hills Community College District	Mendota, Firebaugh, San Joaquin, Huron, Coalinga, Lemoore, Avenal, and the unincorporated communities of Tranquility, Riverdale, Biola, and Five Points in Fresno and Kings Counties, CA	$3,000,000	Disadvantaged individuals
Western Iowa Tech Community College (WITCC)	Woodbury County, IA	$3,999,459	Dislocated workers, low-income adults, and disconnected youth
White Earth Band of Chippewa	Mahnomen, Clearwater, and Becker counties, MN	$3,086,817	High school dropouts, unemployed individuals, and individuals with criminal records
Workforce Development of Seattle-King County	Southeast Seattle, WA	$3,639,530	High school dropouts, unemployed adults, veterans, previously incarcerated youth and adults, and other disadvantaged individuals - with a specific focus on communities of color, individuals with limited English proficiency, and individuals with disabilities
The WorkPlace Inc.	City of Bridgeport, CT	$4,000,000	High school dropouts, individuals with criminal records, unemployed individuals, and people facing other significant disadvantages
Worksystems Inc.	East Multnomah County, OR	$4,000,000	Native Americans, African-Americans, Latinos, immigrants, veterans, individuals with criminal records, and homeless individuals

== Locations ==
Pathways out of Poverty (POP) grantees are located in 26 states and the District of Columbia. They are primarily located in major metropolitan areas, but some grantees are located in more rural and smaller metropolitan regions.

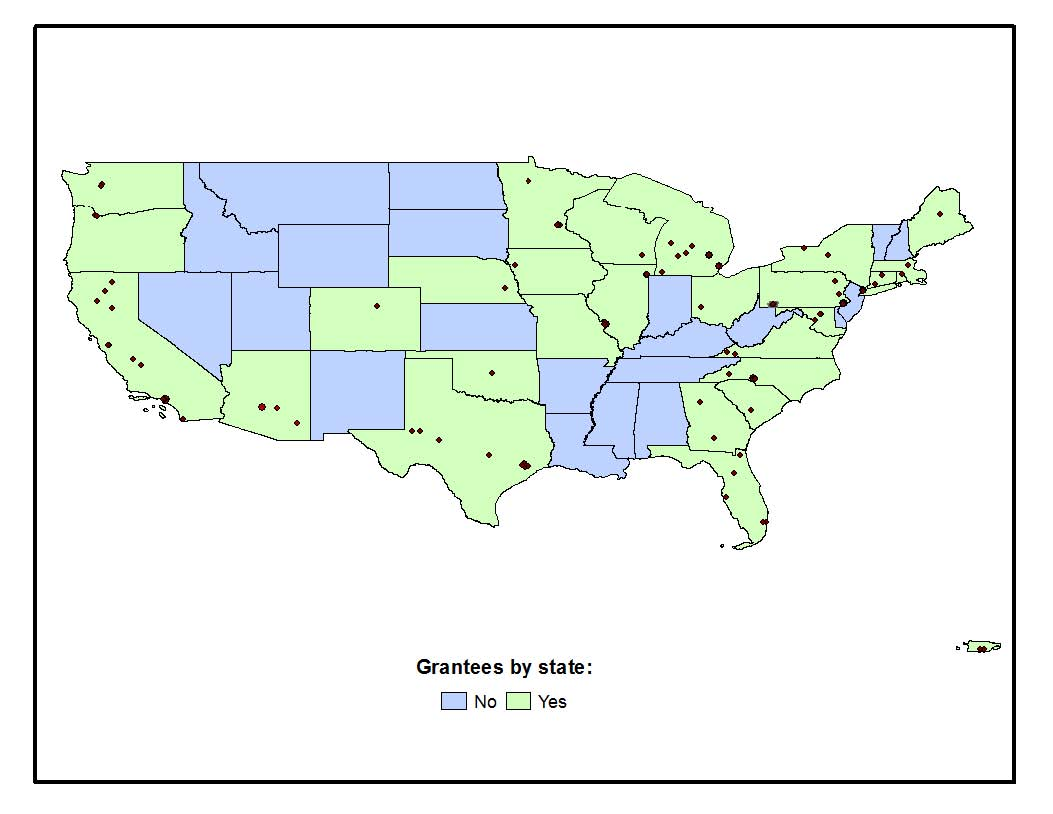
Pathways Out of Poverty Locations

The Department of Labor's Employment and Training Administration particularly encouraged applicants to focus on serving Public Micro Data Areas (PUMAs) with poverty rates of 15 percent or higher. Data from the 2009 American Community Survey 1-Year estimates indicates that the PUMAs covered by grantees had an average percentage of inhabitants in poverty that was ten percentage points higher than the national average, at least within the last twelve months.

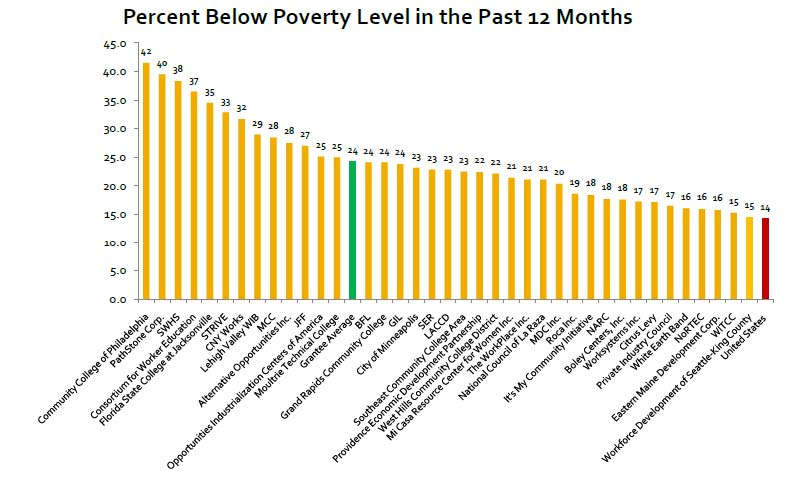
Poverty Level in PUMAs Served by POP Grantees

In addition, on average, PUMAs covered by grantees have inhabitants with lower levels of education, lower levels of health insurance coverage, and lower levels of English fluency. One barrier to economic development in impoverished areas is lack of skills and education possessed by the inhabitants, which is one rationale for workforce development programs.

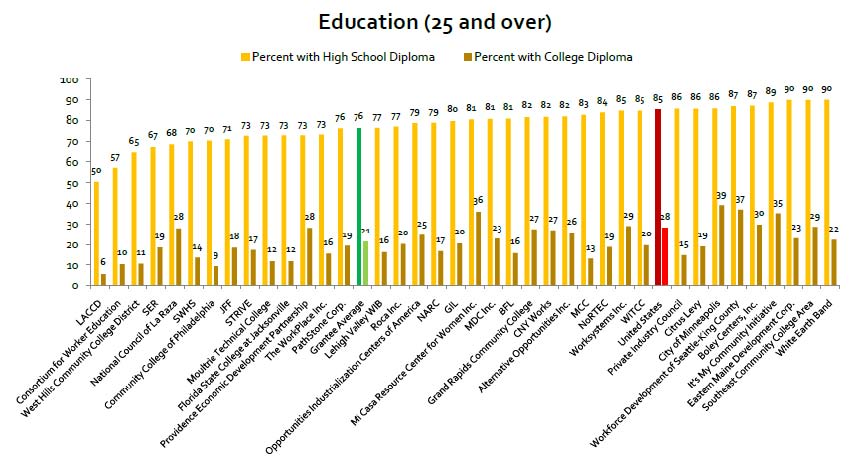
Education in PUMAs Served by POP Grantees

== Training ==
Pathways out of Poverty (POP) grantees proposed providing a variety of services, including sector-based training for green jobs, remedial education and GED help, "soft skills" training, entrepreneurial training, and supportive services. The primary focus of this program is sector-based: grantees are working backwards from specific job categories to design training and place individuals. However, unlike some sector-based programs, POP grantees are enrolling high school dropouts, ex-offenders, and other "harder-to-employ" individuals, as opposed to recruiting more employable individuals. These individuals may require remedial education and GED instruction, which some POP grantees report providing.

=== Green Jobs Training ===
POP grantees are required to train participants for “employment within energy efficiency and renewable energy industries.” Grantees reported training individuals for jobs in the following areas: advanced battery manufacturing, agriculture, forestry, and landscaping, bio-fuel manufacturing and distribution, biofuels, building performance, deconstruction and materials use, energy efficient assessment, energy-efficient building maintenance, energy-efficient building, construction, and retrofit, environmental protection, environmental remediation, recycling, renewable energy and electric power, solar energy, sustainable manufacturing, transportation, waste collection and remediation, water management, and wind energy.

A 2010 report by the Pew Charitable Trust foundation indicates that green jobs or green-collar jobs are starting to make an impact in the U.S. economy. According to this study, green jobs grew about two and a half times faster than job growth in the U.S. economy as a whole between 1998 and 2007. Out of the 125 PUMAs that are served by the 38 local and national POP grantees, 75 are located in states that have an average of more than 15,000 green jobs available as well as an average annual growth rate of 1.03 percent in green jobs for the period from 1998 to 2007. In comparison, the average annual growth rate for green jobs nationwide during this period was 0.91 percent, and the average annual growth rate for all jobs nationwide was 0.4 percent.

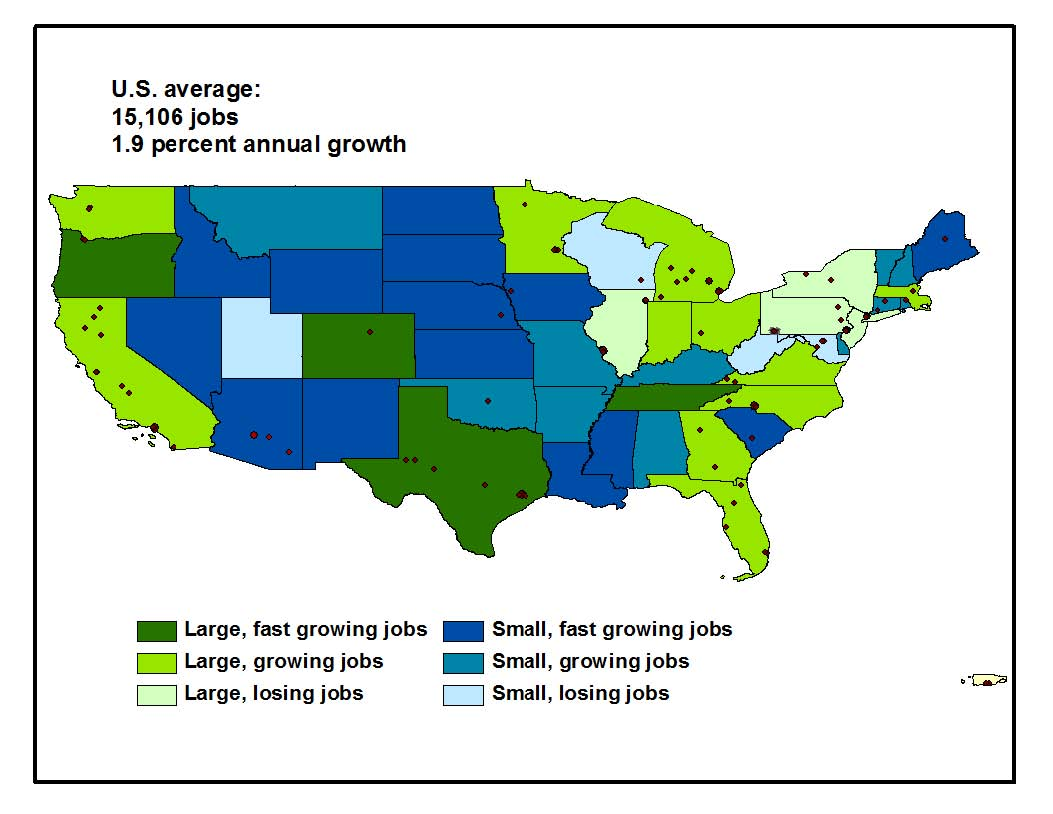
Growth in Clean Jobs by State, 1998-2007, with PUMAs Served by POP Grantees Identified

=== Other Training Provided ===
In order to participate in the program, grantees must provide green jobs training. However, many of the grantees report providing other training and services for their participants in original grant documents. Many participants may need more than green jobs training in order to move out of poverty; "American Recovery and Reinvestment Act of 2009: Pathways Out of Poverty Grants" refers to POP as "integrat[ing] training and supportive services into cohesive programs that will help targeted populations find pathways out of poverty and into economic self-sufficiency." Grantees report providing apprenticeships, basic and "soft skills" training, remedial education/GED services, English to Speakers of Other Languages instruction, literacy instruction, computer training, entrepreneurship training, and supportive and wraparound services. Additionally, grant documents may not encompass the range of services provided by grantees.

Since many grantees report recruiting high school dropouts, remedial education and GED services may be required before recruits are able to participate in green jobs training programs requiring at least high school diplomas. Additionally, several grantees report recruiting individuals with low literacy levels and low levels of English fluency, necessitating the provision of literacy instruction and English to Speakers of Other Languages.

"Soft skills" refers to “dress, language, punctuality, and posture,” as well as other behavioral traits. Some researchers have speculated that lack of these skills forms a greater impediment to employment for disadvantaged individuals than lack of technical skills or education. About seventeen of POP grantees explicitly mentioned helping participants with “basic or soft skills.”

Support and wraparound services could include free childcare, assistance with transportation, and counseling. About sixteen grantees listed providing these types of services, although they did not list specific services provided. Research indicates that providing these types of services as part of a workforce development program can help improve program participation and reduce attrition.

== Outcomes ==
Since grantees were only announced in January 2010, outcomes from this program are not yet fully known. However, grantees listed proposed outcomes in terms of number of participants enrolled, number of individuals to complete training, number of individuals to complete a degree or certificate, and number of individuals to gain employment.

Proposed outcomes from national grantees (in number of individuals):

Organization	Enroll	Complete Training	Receive Degree or Certificate	Gain Employment
East Harlem Employment Services Inc.	1,819			881
Goodwill Industries International (GII)	1,300			571
Jobs for the Future Inc. (JFF)	1,130	997	770	910
MDC Inc.		700		400
National Association of Regional Councils (NARC)		500		500
National Council of La Raza		161		161
Opportunities Industrialization Centers of America Inc.		1,350		1,066
PathStone Corp.	1,176			616

Proposed outcomes from local grantees (in number of individuals):

Organization	Enroll	Complete Training	Receive Degree or Certificate	Gain Employment
Alternative Opportunities Inc.	200			80% of graduates
Better Family Life Inc. (BFL)	900			700
Boley Centers Inc.	150			125
Citrus Levy Marion Regional Workforce Development Board Inc.	665			556
City of Minneapolis	500	400		300
CNY Works Inc.	750		366	293
Community College of Philadelphia	250		225	203
Consortium for Worker Education	425			297
Eastern Maine Development Corp.			105	90
Florida State College at Jacksonville	390	332		282
Grand Rapids Community College	1,080			302
It's My Community Initiative	236			200
Lehigh Valley Workforce Investment Board, Inc.	200	100		75
Los Angeles Community College District (LACCD)	925			667
Mi Casa Resource Center	500	400	150	50
Mott Community College(MCC)		200		140
Mountrie Technical College	260			208
Northern Rural Training and Employment Consortium (NoRTEC)	554	420		420
Private Industry Council of Westmoreland/Fayette Inc.	250			120
Providence Economic Development Partnership	300			180
Roca Inc.	225			140
SER - Jobs for Progress of the Texas Gulf Coast Inc.		300		300
Southeast Community College Area	400	220	180	192
Southwest Housing Solutions Corp. (SWHS)		360		310
West Hills Community College District			150	126
Western Iowa Tech Community College (WITCC)		300		300
White Earth Band of Chippewa	240	100		
Workforce Development of Seattle-King County	450			365
The WorkPlace Inc.	700	500		350
Worksystems Inc.	360	300	200	180
