= New-collar worker =

Worker adapted to a technology dominated work environment

A new-collar worker is an individual who develops technical and soft skills needed to work in the contemporary technology industry through nontraditional education paths. The term was introduced by IBM CEO Ginni Rometty in late 2016 and refers to "middle-skill" occupations in technology, such as cybersecurity analysts, application developers and cloud computing specialists.

== Etymology ==
The term "new-collar job" is a play on “blue-collar job”. It originated with IBM's CEO Ginni Rometty, relating to the company's efforts to increase the number of people qualified for technology jobs. In November 2016, Rometty wrote an open letter to then-President-elect Donald Trump, which introduced the idea of "new-collar jobs" and urged his support for the creation of these types of roles. Rometty coined the term in response to new employment designations as industries are moving into a new technology era, and jobs are created that require new skills in data science, cloud computing and artificial intelligence.

== Occupations and education requirements ==
According to Rometty, "relevant skills, sometimes obtained through vocational training", are the qualifying characteristics of new-collar work. Typical new-collar jobs include: cloud computing technicians, database managers, cybersecurity analysts, user interface designers, and other assorted IT roles. Technical skills and education are required for these roles but not necessarily a four-year college degree. Skills may be developed through nontraditional education such as community college courses and industry certification programs. Employers of new-collar workers value the ability to adapt and learn, equally to more formal education. As well, training for new-collar jobs often involves development of relevant soft skills. Due to a widespread skills gap, industry demand for new-collar workers has led to the development of education initiatives focused on technical skills. Examples of such initiatives include a partnership between Delta Air Lines and about 37 aviation maintenance schools in the US to develop a curriculum focused on skills needed in the aviation industry, and IBM's P-Tech program for high-school and associate degree.

== Usage ==
In the United States, the "New Collar Jobs Act" was released by Representatives Ted Lieu (California), Matt Cartwright (Pennsylvania) and Ann McLane Kuster (New Hampshire) in July 2017. The Act sought to provide scholarship funding and debt relief for individuals who study cybersecurity and take up cybersecurity roles, as well as establishing tax breaks for employers that offer cybersecurity training. In August 2017, Virginia Lt. Governor Ralph Northam announced a vocational training program titled "Get Skilled, Get A Job, and Give Back", focused on skills for new-collar jobs.

== Core skills in new-collar roles ==
New-collar roles typically require a combination of the following skills:

- Technical skills: Including coding, network administration, data analysis, and cloud infrastructure management.
- Soft skills: Communication, problem-solving, teamwork, and adaptability.
- Digital literacy: Proficiency in software tools, online platforms, and understanding data privacy principles.

These skills are often acquired through non-traditional education pathways such as coding bootcamps, community college programs, online certifications, and industry-recognized credentialing programs.

== See also ==
- Designation of workers by collar color
- IBM SkillsBuild
