= Gold collar =

Gold collar may refer to

- Gold Collar, a prestigious competition in the UK greyhound calendar
- Gold-collar worker

== See also ==
- Livery collar, a gold chain of office, worn around the neck
