= Clerk =

White-collar worker who conducts general office tasks

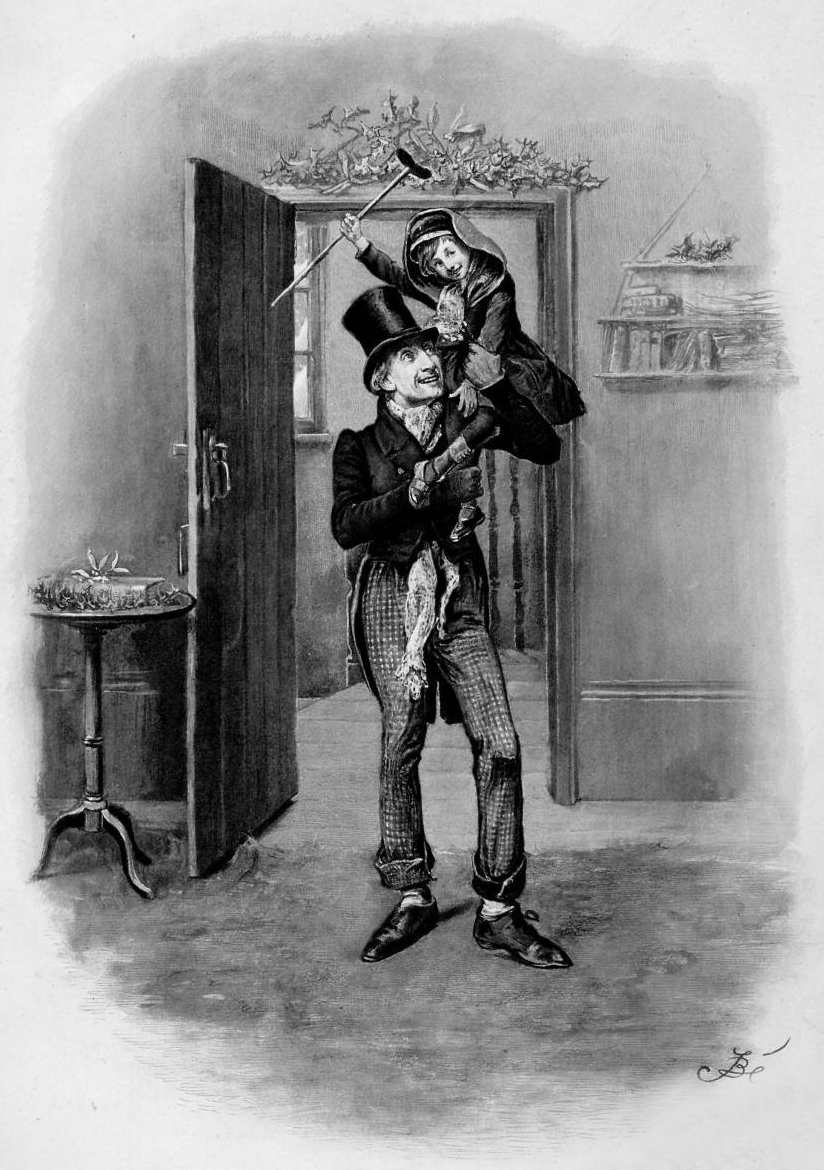
Bob Cratchit, the clerk of Ebeneezer Scrooge in A Christmas Carol by Charles Dickens.

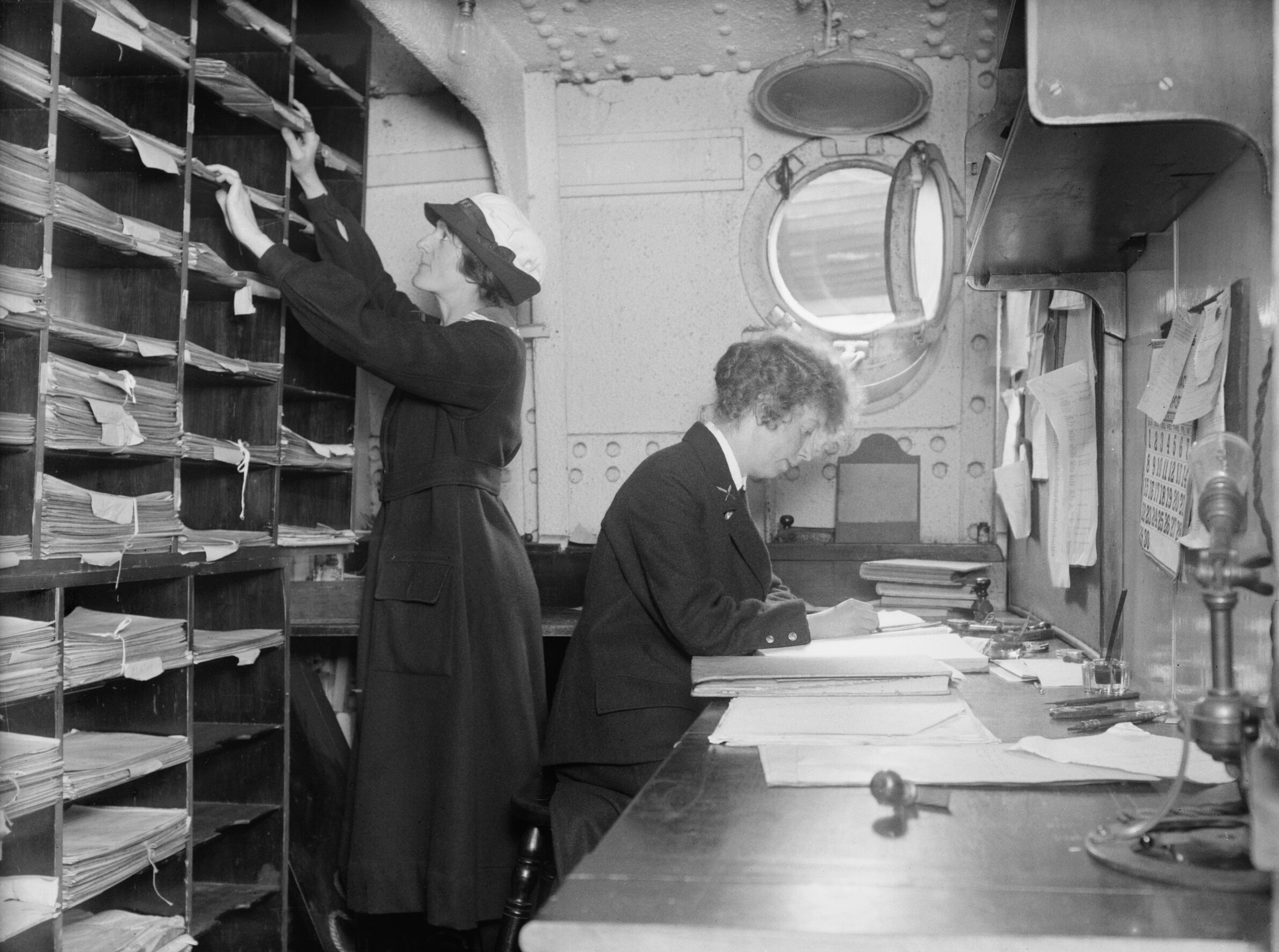
Two Women's Royal Naval Service clerks aboard HMS Essex during World War I

A clerk is a white-collar worker in an administrative professional capacity who conducts record keeping as well as general office tasks, or a grey-collar worker (or to a lesser extent, a blue-collar worker) who performs similar sales-related tasks in a retail environment. The responsibilities of clerical workers commonly include record keeping, filing, staffing service counters, screening callers, and other administrative tasks. In City of London livery companies, the clerk is the chief executive officer.

== History and etymology ==
The word clerk is derived from the Latin clericus meaning "cleric" or "clergyman", which is the latinisation of the Greek κληρικός (klērikos) from a word meaning a "lot" (in the sense of drawing lots) and hence an "apportionment" or "area of land".

The association derived from medieval courts, where writing was mainly entrusted to clergy because most laymen could not read. In this context, the word clerk meant "scholar". Even today, the term clerk regular designates a type of cleric (one living life according to a rule). The cognate terms in some languages, notably Klerk in Dutch, became – at the end of the nineteenth century – restricted to a specific, fairly low rank in the administrative hierarchy.

== United States ==
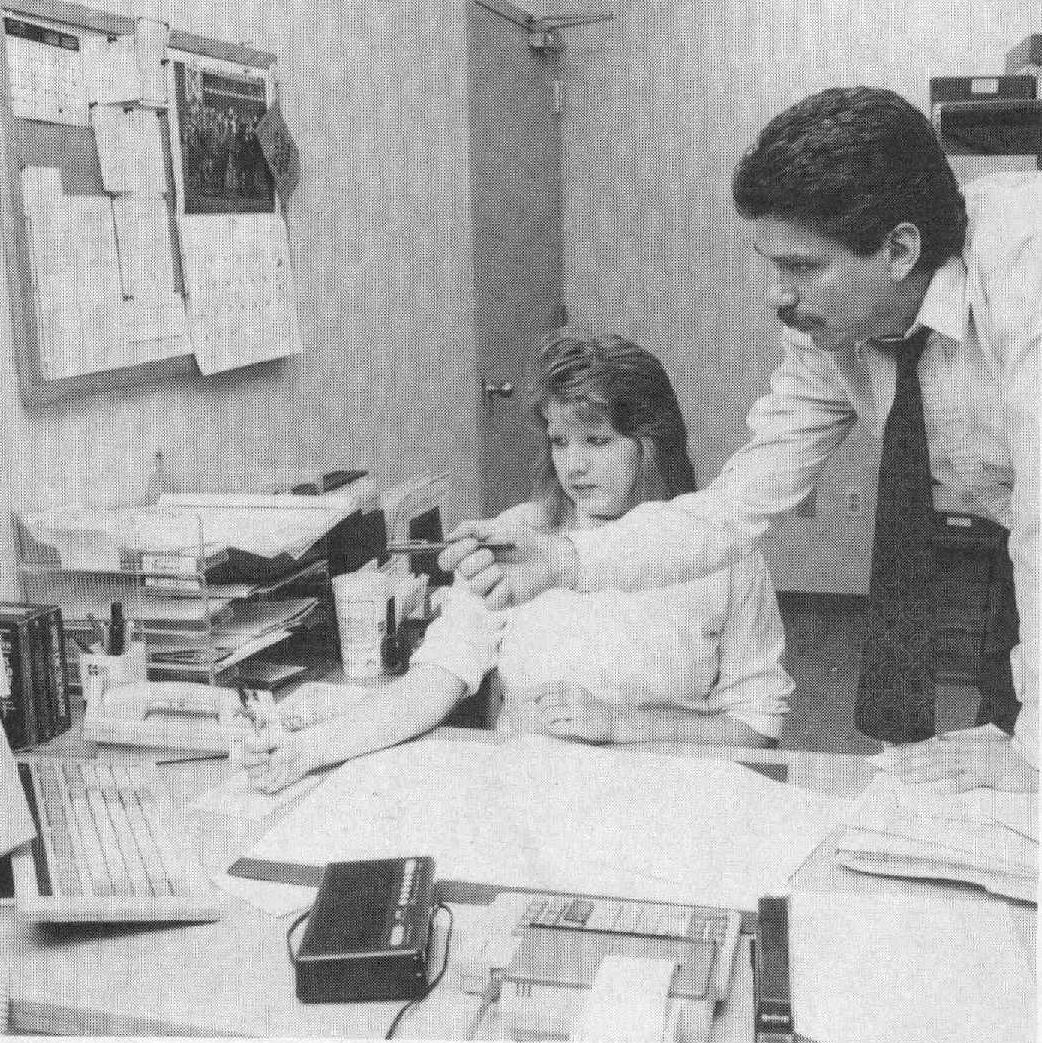
American clerical office supervisor at work. (1992)

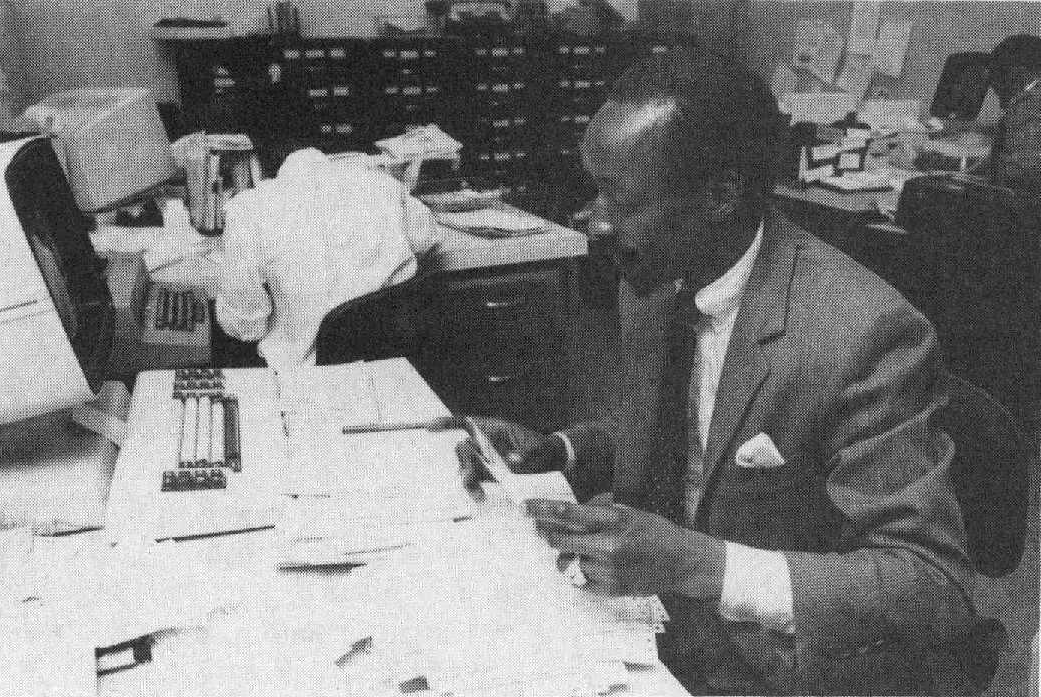
Office clerk at work. (1992)

Clerical workers are the largest occupational group in the United States. In 2004, there were 3.1 million general office clerks, 1.5 million office administrative supervisors and 4.1 million secretaries. Clerical occupations often do not require a college degree, though some college education or 1 to 2 years in vocational programs are common qualifications. Familiarity with office equipment and certain software programs is also often required. Employers may provide clerical training. In 2006, the median salary for clerks was $23,000, while the national median income for workers age 25 or older was $33,000. Median salaries ranged from $22,770 for general office clerks to $34,970 for secretaries and $41,030 for administrative supervisors. Clerical workers are considered working class by American sociologists such as William Thompson, Joseph Hickey or James Henslin as they perform highly routinized tasks with relatively little autonomy. Sociologist Dennis Gilbert, argues that the white and blue collar divide has shifted to a divide between professionals, including some semi-professionals, and routinized white collar workers. White collar office supervisors may be considered lower middle class with some secretaries being located in that part of the socio-economic strata where the working and middle classes overlap.

== See also ==
- Clerk of works
- Court clerk
- Law clerk
- Legal clerk
- Legislative clerk
- Barristers' clerk
- Lord Justice Clerk
- Patent clerk
- Municipal clerk or town clerk
- Clerk in holy orders
- Receptionist
- Pink collar
- Secretaries
