= Green development =

Real estate development concept

Green development is a real estate development concept that considers social and environmental impacts of development. It is defined by three sub-categories: environmental responsiveness, resource efficiency, and community and cultural sensitivity. Environmental responsiveness respects the intrinsic value of nature, and minimizes damage to an ecosystem. Resource efficiency refers to the use of fewer resources to conserve energy and the environment. Community and cultural sensitivity recognizes the unique cultural values that each community hosts and considers them in real estate development, unlike more discernible signs of sustainability, like solar energy, (solar panels are more visibly "green" than the use of local materials). Green development manifests itself in various forms, however it is generally based on solution multipliers: features of a project that provide additional benefits, which ultimately reduce the projects' environmental impacts.

== History ==
Green development emerged as a result of the environmental movement in the 1970s. In the real estate industry, use of the term commenced in 1987 with a report from the World Commission on Environment and Development, entitled "Our Common Future". The report includes 16 principles of environmental management, designed to foster green development. It also discusses the traditional model of macroeconomic growth, and its disregard for environmental consequences. Following this initial movement, the real estate industry experienced a back-and-forth relationship with "green" methodologies; environmental issues often came second behind purely economic factors. Incessant environmental concern and legislation affecting the real estate sector began to emerge, i.e. green development. However, a common concern of green development is that it may increase project costs and completion times. Hence there has been an ongoing argument of whether green strategies can be sustainable as well as economically stimulating. National environmental attention has since worked its way down to real estate developers, and become an increasing priority. Developers today must work within the parameters of legislation that now considers the environmental implications of development.

== Legislation ==
In response to increasing public concern regarding environmental issues, governments have enacted legislation that regulates various aspects of the real estate industry, as well as other sectors of the economy. In the United States such legislation includes the National Environmental Policy Act (NEPA), the Clean Air Act, the Clean Water Act, the Coastal Zone Management Act, and the Comprehensive Environmental Response, Compensation, and Liability Act (CERCLA; also known as "Superfund."). NEPA, enacted in 1970, changed how federal agencies made decisions because it required them to propose environmental analysis before starting a project. The Clean Air Act (1970) requires the United States Environmental Protection Agency (EPA) to set national standards for clean air and pollution control regulations. The Clean Water Act (1972) was designed to minimize pollution in natural bodies of water, and also to ensure water quality that protects drinking water sources and supports recreational activities such as fishing or swimming. The Coastal Zone Management Act (1972) manages the nation's coastal resources such as Great Lakes and estuaries. CERCLA is commonly referred to as "Superfund" because it comprises two trust funds that provide help to improve areas that have been polluted by hazardous waste. The Superfund Amendments and Reauthorization Act of 1986 allows the government to lien a property that is being cleaned up. Additionally, the California Environmental Quality Act (CEQA) is California's most comprehensive piece of legislation regarding the environment. This act applies to all decisions made by cities and counties in California, and includes the mandate of an Environmental Impact Report (EIR), to both public and private projects. Subsequently, any new real estate development is subject to a detailed environmental analysis before starting a project.

California's Senate Bill (SB) 375 (2008) is another piece of legislation that promotes green development. It aims to achieve California's climate goals via more efficient land use and development patterns. More specifically, SB 375 seeks to reduce greenhouse gas (GHG) emissions through close coordination between land-use and transportation. One way this is achieved is through demand-side measures. This strategy would decrease driving demand, and therefore reduce vehicle miles traveled (VMT), and ultimately reduce GHG emissions. For example, a demand-side policy component may include placing public transit stops near development, in order to maximize walkability.

Additionally, California state law requires minimum energy conservation levels for all new and/or existing development projects. The seller of a home is required to include information regarding energy conservation retrofitting and thermal insulation in the sales contract.

== In practice ==
=== Broad development patterns ===
Senate Bill 375 demonstrates an urban planning strategy called growth management. It is defined by a close coordination between land-use controls and capital investment and heavily motivated by environmental issues. It is defined by "the regulation of the amount, timing, location, and character of development." As the name may suggest, growth management may not imply limiting any growth. "Growth control" carries the connotation of managing or limiting growth, and "no growth" would indicate stopping growth all together. Moreover, Growth Management requires the cooperation of all three of these connotations.

Urban Growth Boundaries (UBG's), are popular growth management strategies. They are designed to encourage growth within a given boundary and discourage it outside the boundary. The goal of the UGB is to promote dense development, in order to decrease urban sprawl. This growth management technique ultimately seeks to revitalize central cities, and create vibrant, walk-able spaces for community development.

These clustered development patterns are solution multipliers. Reducing demand for infrastructure can save money and resources. These multipliers can increase walkability, which fosters social interaction and community togetherness.

=== Intelligent building ===
In the US, commercial and residential buildings are the highest consumers of electricity and HVAC systems comprise a large portion of this usage. In fact, the US Department of Energy projects that 70% of the electricity used in the US is from buildings. Intelligent building methods such as occupancy detection systems, wireless sensor networks, and HVAC control systems aim to more efficient energy usage. A team of researchers at the University of San Diego, project that their smart building automation systems will save 10–15% in building energy.

== Case studies ==
=== The Holly Street Village Apartments ===
The city of Pasadena, California has recently adopted a general plan based on seven guiding principles: community needs and quality of life, preservation of Pasadena's historic character, economic vitality, a healthy family community, lack of need for automobiles, promoted as a cultural, scientific, corporate, entertainment and educational center for the region, and community participation.

This project included environmental concern and social considerations in the process of construction. The Holly Street Village Apartments in Pasadena address several of the principles outlined in Pasadena's general plan. It incorporates mixed-use development with ground-floor retail center including a deli, a convenience store and an art gallery. Also, the Holly Street Village Apartments is located near a light rail station. The goal of these strategies is to reduce the demand for automobiles, and making it easier for people to use public transportation.

=== Inn of the Anasazi ===
Zimmer Associates International, a real estate development firm, completed the Inn of the Anasazi in Santa Fe, New Mexico in 1991. Robert Zimmer (co-founder) and his partners, Steve Conger and Michael Fuller, set a goal to construct a building that would, "showcase energy- and resource-saving technologies, strengthen local community, offer first class elegance, and financially reward its participants." The interior design of the hotel pays respect to the ancient Anasazi Indians, including locally crafted furniture, hand-made rugs, and Native American, Hispanic and cowboy wall art. The use of adobe on the exterior of the hotel includes the historic pueblo style. Also, Zimmer and his partners repurposed a steel-framed building that had previously been used in the 1960s as a juvenile detention center, instead of starting the project from the beginning. Other "green" characteristics of this Santa Fe hotel are skylights, energy-efficient lighting, and water-saving fixtures. Also, the Inn of the Anasazi stimulates the regional economy by purchasing locally grown organic food from Hispanic farmers. Lastly the Inn encourages that the staff participate in local nonprofit organizations and events that sponsor diverse local cultures. The Inn of the Anasazi integrates "social and environmental goals with financial considerations…"

=== Taipei 101 ===
Taipei 101, stylized as TAIPEI 101, is a 1,667 feet (508 m) tall skyscraper located in Taipei, Taiwan which has received LEED (Leadership in Energy and Environmental Design) certification from the U.S. Green Building Council as the highest score in history. In this project, "TAIPEI" is an acronym for "technology," "art," "innovation," "people," "environment," and "identity. Dr. Hubert Keiber, CEO of Siemens Building Automation in Taipei, stresses energy efficiency on the grounds that energy is the single largest expense for commercial buildings. Since 2011, the Taipei 101 has become the world's most environmentally responsible skyscraper, reducing water use, energy use, and carbon emissions all by 10%.

=== Boulder, Colorado ===
Growth management/limitation (discussed previously) manifests itself in Boulder, Colorado. The city of Boulder very tightly restricts housing development by limiting housing permits to 400 per year, which is 1 percent of the city's total housing stock. Additionally, the city has purchased land outside of the city limits, designated for permanent, green open space. This 400-unit cap seriously hinders population growth in the city.

This shortage of housing has several repercussions. First, it increases housing prices. Also, because Boulder restricts housing development more than it does commercial development, the number of available workers in Boulder grows faster than the housing stock. This results in many workers who commute from beyond the city limits.

== Controversy ==
A common critique of green development is that it negatively affects the way real estate developers do business, as it can increase cost and create delay. For example, becoming LEED-certified can contribute to additional costs. This includes additional building design and construction fees, interior design and construction fees, building operations and maintenance fees, neighborhood development fees, home and campus fees, and volume program fees.

Additionally, green development has been critiqued on a residential level. High-performance homes have proven to save energy in the long run, but they rapidly increase up-front capital costs, via tankless water heaters, radiant barriers and reflective insulation systems, and high efficiency air conditioning systems. Also, developers are often unable to develop on certain portions of land due to conservation easements. These easements are purchased by governments or non-governmental organizations, in order to "preserve land in its natural, scenic, agricultural, historical, forested, or open-space condition."

== See also ==
- Bioneers
- Conservation development
- Green building
- Green-collar worker
- Low impact development
- Passive solar building design
- Sustainable development
- Traffic calming
