= White-collar worker =

Social class; person who performs intellectual labor

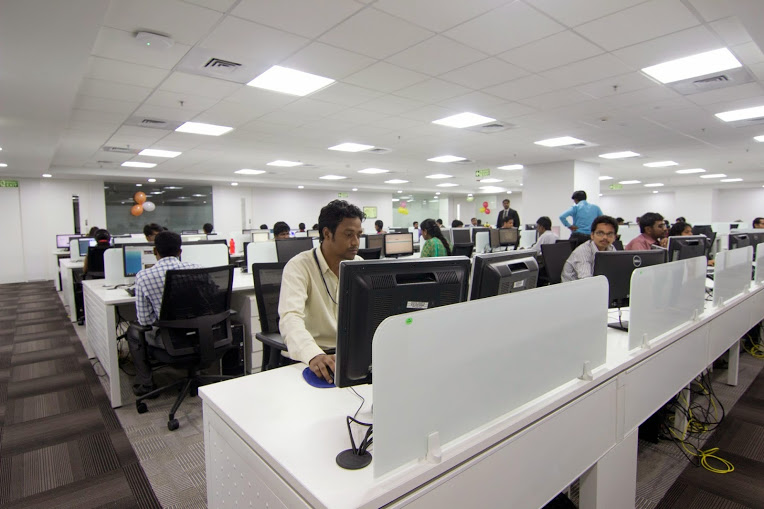
Office workers

A white-collar worker is a person who performs knowledge-based, aptitude-based, managerial, or administrative work generally performed in an office or similar setting.

In contrast, blue-collar workers perform manual labor or work in skilled trades; pink-collar workers work in care, health care, social work, or teaching; green-collar workers specifically work in the environmental sector; and grey-collar jobs combine manual labor and skilled trades with non-manual or managerial duties.

== Etymology ==
The term refers to the white dress shirts or detachable collars of male office workers common through most of the nineteenth and twentieth centuries in Western countries, as opposed to the blue overalls worn by many manual laborers.

The term "white collar" is credited to Upton Sinclair, an American writer, in relation to contemporary clerical, administrative, and management workers during the 1930s, though references to white-collar work appear as early as 1935. White collar employees are considered highly educated and talented as compared to blue collar.

== Health effects ==
Less physical activity among white-collar workers has been thought to be a key factor in increased life-style related health conditions such as fatigue, obesity, diabetes, hypertension, cancer, and heart disease. Also, working at a computer could potentially lead to diseases associated with monotonous data entry, such as carpal tunnel syndrome. Workplace interventions such as alternative activity workstations, sit-stand desks, and promotion of stair use are among measures being implemented to counter the harms of sedentary workplace environments. The quality of evidence used to determine the effectiveness and potential health benefits of many of these interventions is weak. More research is needed to determine which interventions may be effective in the long term. Low-quality evidence indicates that sit-stand desks may reduce sitting in the workplace during the first year of their use; however, it is not clear if sit-stand desks may be effective at reducing sitting in the longer-term. An intervention to encourage office workers to stand and move reduced their sitting time by 22 minutes after 1 year; the effect was 3 times greater when the intervention included a sit-to-stand desk. The intervention also led to small improvements in stress, well-being, and vigor.

== Demographics ==
Formerly a minority in the agrarian and early industrial societies, white-collar workers have become a majority in industrialized countries due to modernization and outsourcing of manufacturing jobs.

The blue-collar and white-collar phrases may no longer be literally accurate, as office attire has broadened beyond a white shirt. Employees in many offices may dress in colourful casual or business casual clothes. In addition, the work tasks have blurred. "White-collar" employees may perform "blue-collar" tasks (or vice versa). An example would be a restaurant manager who may wear more formal clothing yet still assist with cooking food or taking customers' orders, or a construction worker who also performs desk work.

With the emergence of the AI boom, there have been studies released arguing white-collar workers are, as of 2024, more susceptible to technological unemployment caused by AI (which according to those studies has already started) relative to blue, grey or pink-collar workers.

== White-collar jobs ==
White-collar workers include job paths related to:

- Accountancy
- Architecture
- Archival science
- Banking
- Business and executive management
- Cybersecurity
- Compliance
- Consulting
- Customer support
- Data privacy
- Design
- Economics
- Engineering
- Finance
- Government
- Healthcare
- Human resources
- Information technology
- Insurance
- Internal audit
- Legal
- Library and information science
- Market research
- Marketing
- Networking
- Operations research
- Public relations
- Real estate
- Research and development
- Risk management
- Science
- Scientific research
- Technology

Some examples of white-collar jobs are:

- Accountant
- Actuary
- Advertising
- Architect
- Auditor
- Banker
- Bookkeeper
- Business analyst
- Business development
- Chemist
- Civil engineer
- Computer programmer
- Counselor
- Data analyst
- Data scientist
- Dentist
- Designer
- Doctor
- Economist
- Editor
- Electrical engineer
- Engineers
- Financial analyst
- Graphic designer
- Human resources
- Information technology
- Insurance broker
- Investment banker
- Journalist
- Lawyer
- Librarian
- Lobbyist
- Metallurgist
- Management consultant
- Marketing
- Pharmacist
- Physician
- Professor
- Project manager
- Psychiatrist
- Psychologist
- Public relations
- Real estate broker
- Researcher
- Sales
- Social worker
- Statistician
- Systems analyst
- Teacher
- Technical writer
- Urban planner
- Web developer

== See also ==
- Designation of workers by collar color
- Knowledge worker
- Lists of occupations
- Salaryman
- White-collar crime
