= Green-collar worker =

Environmental-sector worker

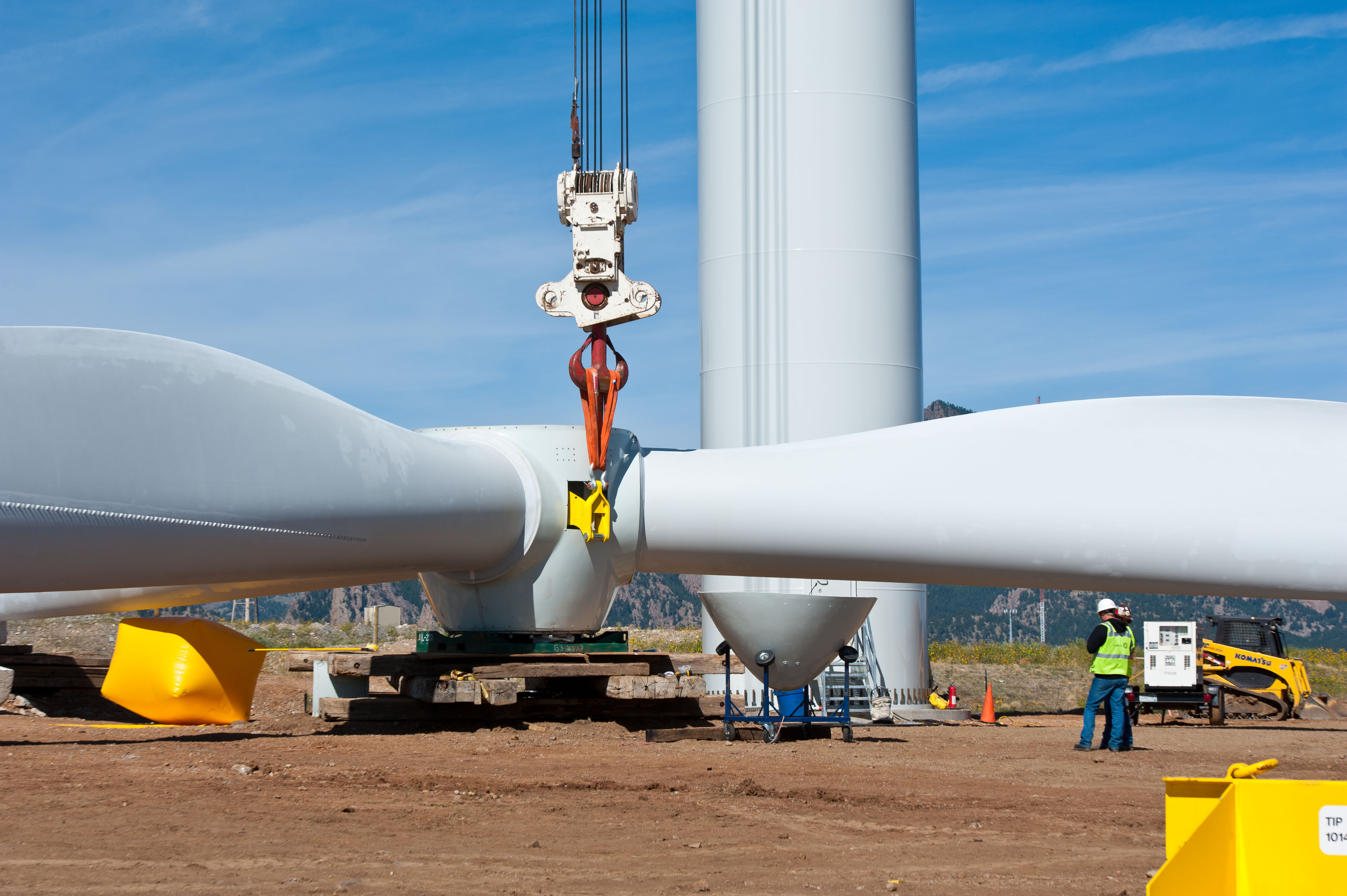
Wind turbine worker on a wind farm in Colorado.

A green-collar worker is a worker who is employed in an environmental sector of the economy. Environmental green-collar workers (or green jobs) satisfy the demand for green development. Generally, they implement environmentally conscious design, policy, and technology to improve conservation and sustainability. Formal environmental regulations as well as informal social expectations are pushing many firms to seek professionals with expertise with environmental, energy efficiency, and clean renewable energy issues. They often seek to make their output more sustainable, and thus more favorable to public opinion, governmental regulation, and the Earth's ecology.

Green collar workers include professionals such as conservation movement workers, environmental consultants, council environmental services/waste management/recycling managers/officers, environmental or biological systems engineers, green building architects, landscape architects, holistic passive solar building designers, solar energy and wind energy engineers and installers, nuclear engineers, green vehicle engineers, "green business" owners, green vehicle, organic farmers, environmental lawyers, ecology educators, and ecotechnology workers, and sales staff working with these services or products. Green collar workers also include vocational or trade-level workers: electricians who install solar panels, plumbers who install solar water heaters, recycling centre/MRF attendants, process managers and collectors, construction workers who build energy-efficient green buildings and wind power farms, construction workers who weatherize buildings to make them more energy efficient, or other workers involved in clean, renewable, sustainable future energy development.

There is a growing movement to incorporate social responsibility within the green industries. A sustainable green economy simultaneously values the importance of natural resources and inclusive, equitable, and healthy opportunities for all communities.

In the context of the 2008 financial crisis, many experts now argue that a massive push to develop renewable sources of energy could create millions of new jobs and help the economy recover while simultaneously improving the environment, increasing labour conditions in poor economies, and strengthening energy and food security.

== Notable uses ==
1. Of or pertaining to both employment and the environment or environmentalism.
  - 1976, Patrick Heffernan, "Jobs for the Environment — The Coming Green Collar Revolution", in Jobs and Prices in the West Coast Region: Hearing before the Joint Economic Committee, Congress of the United States, Ninety-Fourth Congress, Second Session, U.S. Government Printing Office, page 134,
  - 1997, Geoff Mulgan, Perri 6 [sic] et al., The British Spring: A Manifesto for the Election After Next, Demos, page 26,
    The United States, Canada, Germany, and Denmark are all generating hundreds of thousands of new 'green collar' jobs, especially for young people, achieving remarkable reductions in energy, water, waste disposal and materials costs.
  - 2001, Diane Warburton and Ian Christie, From Here to Sustainability: Politics in the Real World, Earthscan, page 75,
    Studies for the UK suggest that the more than 100,000 existing 'green collar' workers in environmental occupations could be joined by many thousands more, both in the private sector and in the 'social economy' of community enterprises.
  - 2007, U.S. Green Jobs Act
  - 2007, U.S. Energy Independence and Security Act - Title X: "Green Jobs - Energy Efficiency and Renewable Energy Worker Training Program" (signed into law 2007-12-19)
  - 2008, during the U.S. Presidential Campaign, both Hillary Clinton and Barack Obama specifically promised more green collar jobs, and green vehicle bonds. Other candidates' energy policy of the United States recommendations all included increased green development, which should accelerate the creation of millions of new green jobs.
  - 2008, January 22 U.S. Federal Reserve Board unprecedented mid-term 3/4% interest rate cut to soon be followed by other economic stimulus to avoid recession and support new job development in green building construction, remodeling/weatherization, transportation (green vehicles) and green manufacturing industry sectors. Widespread bipartisan, Administration and Congressional support for immediate economic stimulus funding, with a bias toward increasing sustainable green-collar jobs.
2. Of or pertaining to rural, agricultural employment; often contrasted with urban blue-collar employment.
  - 1983, U.S. Senate Subcommittee on Forestry, Water Resources, and Environment, Cultivation of Marihuana in National Forests: Hearing Before the Subcommittee on Forestry, Water Resources, and Environment, […], U.S. Government Printing Office, page 32,
    American [marijuana] growers, who have more recently become known as America's "green-collar" workers because of the bright green color of their product, […]
  - 2004, Martin Heidenreich et al., Regional Innovation Systems: The Role of Governances in a Globalized World, Routledge UK, page 394,

Qualification structure of the workforce (%)	1980	1997
Blue-collar	29.7	33.5
Green-collar	21.2	10.0
White-collar	25.0	31.7
Grey-collar	24.0	24.8

== Al Gore Repower America ==
Al Gore states that economists across the spectrum — including Martin Feldstein and Lawrence Summers — agree that large and rapid investments in a jobs-intensive infrastructure initiative is the best way to revive the economy in a quick and sustainable way.

== Center for American Progress ==
A report from the Center for American Progress concludes that a $100 billion federal investment in sustainable energy technologies over 2009 and 2010 would yield 2 million new U.S. jobs, cutting the unemployment rate by 1.3% and put the nation on a path toward a low-carbon economy. The report, prepared by the Political Economy Research Institute at the University of Massachusetts Amherst, proposes $50 billion in tax credits for energy efficiency retrofits and renewable energy systems; $46 billion in direct government spending for public building retrofits, mass transit, freight rail, smart electrical grid systems, and renewable energy systems; and $4 billion for federal loan guarantees to help finance building retrofits and renewable energy projects. The Center believes that sustainable energy investments would yield about 300,000 more jobs than if the same funds were distributed among U.S. taxpayers. The sustainable energy investments would also have the added benefits of lower home energy bills and reduced prices for non-renewable energy sources, due to the reduced consumption of those energy sources.

== Worldwatch Institute/UNEP ==
Global efforts to tackle climate change could result in millions of "green" jobs over the coming decades, according to a 2008 study prepared by the Worldwatch Institute with funding from the United Nations Environment Programme (UNEP). The study found that the global market for environmental products and services is projected to double from $1.37 trillion per year at present to $2.74 trillion by 2020, with half of that market in efficient energy use. In terms of energy supply, the renewable energy industry will be particularly important. Some 2.3 million people have found renewable energy jobs in recent years, and projected investments of $630 billion by 2030 would translate into at least 20 million additional jobs.

== U.S. Conference of Mayors ==
Also in 2008, the U.S. Conference of Mayors released a report that finds the U.S. economy currently generates more than 750,000 green jobs, while over the next 30 years, an emphasis on clean energy could result in a five-fold increase, to more than 4.2 million jobs. Engineering, legal, research, and consulting jobs currently dominate the green jobs in the United States and could grow by 1.4 million by 2038, while renewable electricity production will create 1.23 million jobs, alternative transportation fuels will add 1.5 million jobs, and building retrofits will create another 81,000 jobs. The report notes that most of today's jobs are in metropolitan areas, led by New York City; Washington, D.C.; Houston, Texas; and Los Angeles, California.

== Green-Collar Work in China ==
=== Background ===
In China, green-collar work is defined as "employment in industries, professions, departments and enterprises that on an average social level have low input, high output, low consumption, low emissions, recyclability, and are sustainable". With this definition, the main goal of green-collar work is to increase productive efficiency while minimizing resources used in production, including energy, while being environmentally conscious. This framework for green development maintains the current Chinese economic paradigm that has prioritized economic growth. As a general rule, green jobs include jobs in low-carbon development and environment protection. For some examples: environmental protection has existed in China since the 1970s, tree planting commenced in China every year since the PRC was established, and the solar power industry has been producing on a large scale since its beginning in the 1990s.

=== Policy decisions ===
Since 1979, many pieces of legislation have been passed in China regarding environmental protection, including:

Laws regarding pollution: Solid Waste Pollution Prevention and Control Law, Water Pollution Prevention and Control Law, Air Pollution Prevention Law, Water Pollution Control Regulation, The Energy Conservation Law.

Laws regarding recycling and clean production: Clean Production Promotion Law, Renewable Energy Law, Circular Economy Promotion Law.

China has also passed a number of laws for developing renewable energy and optimizing China's energy structure, including: Energy Conservation Law, Eleventh Five-Year Plan – Outline for Economic and Social Development, Plan of Energy Efficiency and Emissions Reduction, Eleventh Five-Year Plan for Environmental Protection, National Climate Change Program, Climate Change Policies and Actions, and the New Energy Development Plan.

These policies aim to develop innovations and optimizations for various power generation technologies, including thermoelectric, hydroelectric, solar, wind, biofuel, and nuclear. In addition, the "policies promote the clean usage of coal, the use of coal-bed and coal-well gas".

In 2007, the state council also issued the Comprehensive Plan to Save Energy and Reduce Emissions, giving 45 policy measures to save energy and reduce emissions. The measures related to technological innovation of traditional industries are as follows:

"Accelerate the desulphurization of current facilities for thermal power units, enhancing desulphurized unit's capacity to 213 million kW. Newly built or expanded coal power plants must build desulphurized facilities and reserve places for denitration. Further promote projects in coal washing and clean-burning coal technologies. Strengthen the paper making, brewing, chemical, textile and dyeing industry's waste water and pollution management and technological innovation".

The Chinese government has also implemented measures to promote recycling pilot projects, achieve clean production, and reduce emissions with the Promotion of Clean Production Law, the Solid Waste Pollution Prevention Law, the Promotion of Recycling Law, Rules on Managing Daily Waste, Regulations on Recycling and Handling Electronic Products, as well issuing the Interim Provisions on Promoting Industrial Structure Adjustment, Opinions on Accelerating the Development of the Recycling Economy, Guiding Opinions on the Comprehensive Use of Resources during the Eleventh Five-Year Plan, the Notice of Energy Conservation and Emission Reductions, the Eleventh Five-Year Plan for National Environmental Protection, and Policies and Actions Addressing Climate Change, etc. Additionally, Chapter six of the Eleventh Five-Year Plan for national economic and social development describes a plan for developing China's recycling industry, based on energy saving to mobilize the whole society to recycle.

Another policy focus for green-collar work in China lies in comprehensive resource utilization to achieve speedy development of resource utilization industries, which aims to improve the efficiency of resource use and increase usage for industrial waste.

China has also made policies to develop the environmental protection industry with the Eleventh Five-Year plan. The plan proposed to develop large-scale high efficiency clean power generating facilities and equipment for environmental protection and the comprehensive use of resources. The Plan also proposed to develop equipment manufacturing for environmental protection based on the needs of key environmental protection projects; to actively develop a service industry prioritizing environmental impact assessment, environmental project service; environmental technology research and development; and environmental venture investment.

The Chinese government has also set up a fund for environmental management and supported a number of key projects in ecological management and pollution management through national bonds. These projects include controlling sandstorms in Beijing and Tianjin, setting up environmental protection facilities in west region, control pollution in three rivers and lakes, recycle waste water, industrialize of recycled waste and treated water, engage in environmental pollution management in Beijing, and subsidize programs that benefit forest ecology.

Subsidies have also been introduced to facilitate the growth of green-collar work. These subsidies include electricity price subsidies for desulphurization processes, ecological construction projects (such as climate adaptation measures), clean production projects, environmental research, and production of eco-friendly projects.

China has introduced numerous tax policies to encourage green-collar work. First, the government has introduced tax policies that waives and reduces value-added tax (VAT) for enterprises that comprehensively use resources, that recycle and on-sell waste materials, that buy in waste and recycled products, that create clean energy, that produce environmental protection products, and that process waste-water. For example, since 2001, administrative agencies at all levels have waived VAT for waste-water fees collected by water plants. There have also been reforms for taxes on oil products, which has the effect of encouraging development of low-consumption cars and new-energy cars. Income taxes are also waived and reduced for enterprises that use waste material as raw materials in production and that are producing environmental protection facilities and products. A tax credit for investment and accelerated depreciation policy has also been introduced for environmental protection facilities. China also introduced a resource tax in 1988 that has since been expanded to include: a carbon tax; tax refund recissions for enterprises that export resource-based products such as refined mineral products and crude oil; reductions in the tax refund rate on copper, nickel, ferroalloy, coking coal and hard coke; and reduced tax refund rate for enterprises with high energy consumption and high pollution.

Financial policies have also been enacted to promote the development of green-collar work in China. In 2007, former SEPA, in cooperation with the China People's Bank, and CBRC issued Opinions Regarding the Implementation of Environmental Policies and Regulations requiring the People's Bank and CBRC to work with environmental agencies to guide financial institutions at all levels to introduce different credit policies for enterprises that are forbidden, have been shut down or have restrictions. In particular new loans could not be provided for projects which have not met environmental approvals. Later that year in December 2007, the Ministry of Environmental Protection and CIRC jointly issued the Opinions Regarding Environmental Pollution Liability Insurance, formally launching the green insurance system.

Additionally, China has put forth documents detailing their forestry plans, including: National Afforestation and Greening Plan (2016–2020), National Forest Management Plan (2016–2050), Action Plan for Climate Change in Forestry in the 13th Five-Year Plan, Action Plan for Forestry to Adapt to Climate Change (2016–2020).

=== Working Conditions ===
Workers in Green-collar jobs in China generally enjoy better job security and benefits compared to other industries due to the difficulty in outsourcing this kind of work. These benefits include housing and transportation subsidies, health checks, social security, as well as unemployment and workplace injury insurance. However, in green energy production particularly, overtime and long shifts are very common, largely due to the fact that green energy industries are growing faster than qualified labor is able to be trained. While these workers were typically compensated with overtime pay or supplementary leave, long working hours generally reduce a worker's performance, makes them more susceptible to occupational hazards, and reduce the quality of family life. However, green energy-production work in China is generally less hazardous than non-green energy production work, such as coal mining. But there are still notable hazards associated with green-collar jobs, particularly in power generation systems, such as blade ejection, tower collapse, overheating, the use of high voltage electricity, the use of rotating machinery, working at significant heights, the handling of heavy equipment, etc.

Many workers in green energy-production jobs in China report that they belonged to labor unions, and that representatives were able to participate in companies' management. The unions also help carry out support programs for employees, which have contributed to the stability and satisfaction of the green-energy workforce. However, it is unclear how representatives influence decisions in management, and whether or not workers' voices can be truly reflected in the representatives, since representatives are not always produced through direct elections. It is also worth noting that Chinese workers are not entitled to organize independent trade unions, and that all trade unions must be affiliated with the All-China Federation of Trade Unions (ACFTU), and the formation of competing unions is prohibited. Whether state or privately owned, most trade union representatives are elected by management, rather than by workers, meaning that workers' voices often go unheard.

=== Current State of Green-collar jobs in China ===
China has been increasing investment in infrastructure and environmental protection facilities to create demand within environmental protection industries. Many recent efforts and developments in green-collar work in China have focused on the circular economy, recycling of waste materials, and eradication of high-waste and high-pollution industries. In 2004, there were 1.595 million workers employed in the environmental protection industry. Green employment still is in its early stages in China, accounting for a very little percentage of China's workforce. The overall caliber of workers is still particularly low, and the phasing out of outdated facilities will bring about some job loss. The transformation of some jobs that come with adopting green measures will pose a new challenge to workers who will need to update their skills. Although new green jobs will be created, the number of new positions will be limited compared to the amount of displaced workers who need redeployment, and some industries will not be able to exit quickly due to obligations to redundant workers.

=== Forestry Industry in China ===
Forests are one of the most economical carbon absorbers, with huge employment opportunities in three main areas: first, forestation and reforestation, restoration of degraded forests, and developing a joint system of forestry and agriculture to improve the sustainable development of forests; second, timber production and processing; third, sectors related to forestry, such as forest-tourism, developing chemicals for forests, forest machinery, forestry food, herbal medicines, etc. In 2007, China's total forestation was 2,680,000 hectares, with 980,000 workers registered across all natural forest conservation projects in China. At the same time, there were a total of 1,849,200 registered forestry workers across those who worked in the fields of agricultural forestry and fishery, the fields of public management and organization, in water environment and facility management, and scientific research services. According to the China Forestry Statistical Yearbook 2008, China had over 1200 forest parks, directly or indirectly creating 3.5 million jobs. The UN Food and Agriculture Organization estimates that forest restoration can create 10 million green jobs, particularly in organic farming and biofuel production.

Forestry efforts have received criticisms for being ineffective and even exacerbating desertification and other ecological problems. Many afforestation efforts have relied on monoculture style planting of trees, without taking local ecology into account, in a style called 一刀切 (yi1dao1qie1), or "cutting everything with the same knife". Monoculture afforestation has a few problems ecologically: first, that monoculture trees act as natural pumps that deplete groundwater and intensifies desertification; second, that monoculture manufactures a homogenized landscape that has little regenerative capacity; and third, that monoculture forests are vulnerable to disease and makes for a poor wildlife habitat.

=== Climate Analysis ===
With power generation being a large source of emissions and inefficiency, China's push to develop renewable energy and shut down 'backward' industry has already led to increased energy saving and emission reduction. China currently plans to accelerate this change to renewable energy, with the goal of having renewable energy sources supplying 40% of China's energy by 2050. Additionally, forestry efforts in China have contributed to soaking up carbon dioxide from the atmosphere. A 2015 study estimated that China's forests have absorbed more than 22 Gt of carbon since 1973, which is equal to roughly seven years of carbon emissions. Another 2016 study estimated that carbon storage in China's forest would reach 28 Gt by 2033, which is equal to roughly 9 years of carbon emissions. Another 2018 study also found that each year, China's forests sequester around 5% of the country's CO_{2} emissions. However, there are concerns that despite the forestry efforts, consumption patterns simply encourage deforestation of other countries, offsetting the benefits of forestry efforts in China. The increase in timber demand and food imports suggest that the environmental cost of consumption is being pushed off onto neighboring countries who don't share the same environmental goals as China. Although it is uncertain if the push for more green-collar work will be sufficient to combat the climate crisis, it begins to move in the right direction by reducing Greenhouse gas emissions caused by burning fossil fuels.

== Scientific, environmental, and health justifications for green collar jobs ==
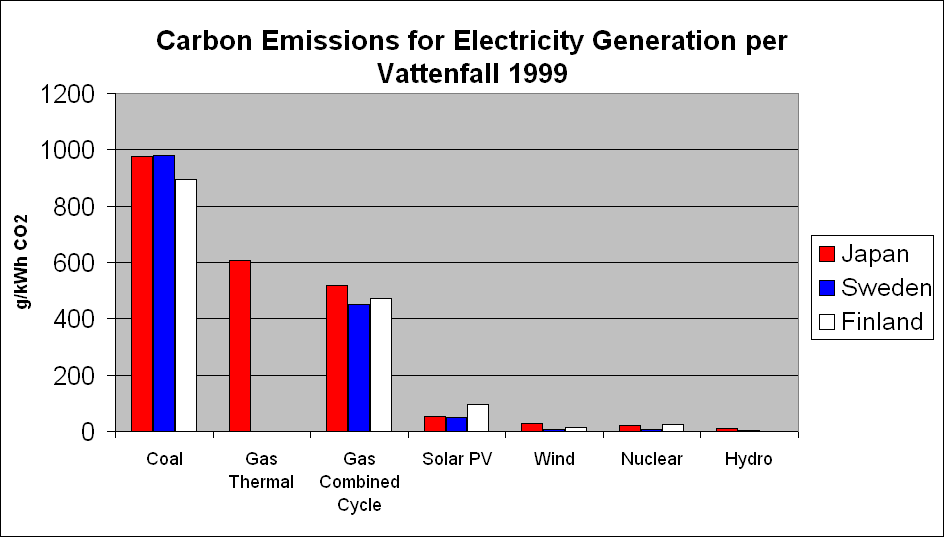
The Vattenfall study found Nuclear, Hydro, and Wind to have far less greenhouse emissions than other sources represented.

The Swedish utility Vattenfall did a study of full life cycle emissions of Nuclear, Hydro, Coal, Gas, Solar Cell, Peat and Wind which the utility uses to produce electricity. The net result of the study was that nuclear power produced 3.3 grams of carbon dioxide per KW-Hr of produced power. This compares to 400 for natural gas and 700 for coal (according to this study). The study also concluded that nuclear power produced the smallest amount of CO_{2} of any of their electricity sources.

Claims exist that the problems of nuclear waste do not come anywhere close to approaching the problems of fossil fuel waste. A 2004 article from the BBC states: "The World Health Organization (WHO) says 3 million people are killed worldwide by outdoor air pollution annually from vehicles and industrial emissions, and 1.6 million indoors through using solid fuel." In the U.S. alone, fossil fuel waste kills 20,000 people each year. A coal power plant releases 100 times as much radiation as a nuclear power plant of the same wattage. It is estimated that during 1982, US coal burning released 155 times as much radioactivity into the atmosphere as the Three Mile Island incident. In addition, fossil fuel waste causes global warming, which leads to increased deaths from hurricanes, flooding, and other weather events. The World Nuclear Association provides a comparison of deaths due to accidents among different forms of energy production. In their comparison, deaths per TW-yr of electricity produced from 1970 to 1992 are quoted as 885 for hydropower, 342 for coal, 85 for natural gas, and 8 for nuclear.

While nuclear energy releases zero carbon dioxide into the atmosphere, there is dangerous waste created that needs to be contained. Until safe, permanent disposal of nuclear waste is created, society will likely remain reliant on fossil fuels. The process used to store nuclear waste has room for improvement and will likely be advanced in the future.

== Other uses ==
"Green collar" is used in the Metal Gear franchise to refer to members of the arms industry, mercenaries, and other individuals in the private sector involved in war and military activity, notably for profit.

== See also ==
- Designation of workers by collar color
- Environmentalism
- Sustainable energy
- Green For All
- Green movement
- Stern Review
