= Green job =

Job in business

Green jobs, also referred to as green-collar jobs, sustainability jobs, eco jobs, or environmental jobs are, according to the United Nations Environment Program, "work in agricultural, manufacturing, research and development (R&D), administrative, and service activities that contribute(s) substantially to preserving or restoring environmental quality. Specifically, but not exclusively, this includes jobs that help to protect ecosystems and biodiversity; reduce energy, materials, and water consumption through high efficiency strategies; de-carbonize the economy; and minimize or altogether avoid generation of all forms of waste and pollution." The environmental sector has the dual benefit of mitigating environmental challenges as well as helping economic growth.

According to the U.S. Bureau of Labor Statistics, green jobs are classified as, "jobs in business that produce goods or services that benefit the environment or conserve natural resources" or "jobs in which workers' duties involve making their establishment's production processes more environmentally friendly or use fewer natural resources". The Bureau of Labor Statistics has established a classification system for green jobs, encompassing a wide range of environmental-focused occupations. These include water conservation, sustainable forestry, biofuels, geothermal energy, environmental remediation, sustainability, energy auditors, recycling, electric vehicles, solar power, and wind energy.

These definitions include jobs which seek to use or develop renewable energy sources (i.e. wind, hydropower, geothermal, landfill gas and municipal solid waste) as well as increase their efficiency. Under the green jobs domain education, training, and public awareness are also included. These jobs seek to enforce regulations, support education, and increase public influence for the benefit of the environment.

== By role ==
This list is not exhaustive, it lists some of the more common environmental jobs and also some of the jobs which have see the fastest recent growth.

=== Agricultural scientist ===
Specialise in agricultural productivity and efficiency. They study commercial plants, animals and cultivation techniques in order to improve the productivity and sustainability of farms and agricultural industries. Agricultural scientists have a higher-than-average proportion of full-time jobs and earnings are above average.

=== Climate change scientist ===
Research and present data on the structure and dynamics of our climate system. Currently there is scientific consensus from a number of American scientific societies that the Earth's temperature is warming.

=== Conservation officer ===
Advance and ensure protection of the natural environment and resources via educating communities and encouraging involvement, and awareness. The growth of these jobs along with forester jobs in the US is predicted to be around 6 per cent (in line with average occupation growth) from 2016 to 2026.

=== Ecologist ===
Investigate ecosystems as a whole- i.e. they investigate both the living and non-living components of the environment. They study the various animals and plants that live within an ecosystem and the relationship between the two.

=== Electric car engineer ===
Use science and maths to design and develop electric automobile technology. They then undertake evaluations with respect to measure the safety, efficiency, cost, reliability, and safety of these aforementioned designs. An Electric Car Engineer is just one of a number of possible jobs in the electric vehicle industry and this type of engineer works in engineering teams to produce electric automobiles.

=== Environmental engineer ===
Examine and mitigate the effects of human and other activities on both the natural and built environment. This could include reducing pollution and protecting the air, water, soil, and humans from actions which may harm either them or the environment. According to CNBC, in 2018 across the world, this was one of the fastest growing environmental jobs. The University of Portland recently reported that they will add a clean energy technology minor to enable their environmental engineering graduates 'compete in an expanding environmental job market'.

=== Environmental scientist ===
They examine the environment (for example by sampling the land, water, air or other natural resources) and develop policies and plans designed to prevent, control or reduce the harmful effects of human activity on the environment. Also one of the fastest growing environmental jobs in the world in 2018 according to CNBC.

=== Environmental consultant ===
Analyse and provide advice on policies and processes which guide the design, implementation and modification of either commercial or government environmental operations and programs. Environmental consultants are often employed to ensure environmental legislation is being adhered to during construction projects. Listed as one of the top ten fastest growing green jobs in Australia in 2018.

=== Environmental health officer ===
Measure risk and develop, oversee, implement and monitor legislation which governs public health for both the built and natural environment. Environmental health officers carry out these aforementioned duties to promote human health and best practices environmentally. Also one of the fastest growing environmental jobs in Australia in 2018.

=== Environmental manager ===
Supervise the environmental performance of private companies and public institutions. They also formulate, execute and oversee environmental strategies that encourage sustainable development. An environmental manager can be employed by a single company to ensure any negative environmental impacts caused by their operation are minimised.

=== Forestry manager / forester ===
In a nutshell they are responsible for the cultivation of forests. Map out and lead the planting, growth, harvesting and conservation of forests for wood production. To ensure balance and sustainable development Foresters may become involved the production of multipurpose forests, sustainable forest management and the reforestation of native woodlands. The growth of these jobs along with conservation officer jobs in the US is predicted to be around 6 per cent (in line with average occupation growth) from 2016 to 2026

According to the Food and Agriculture Organization of the United Nations, forests provide more than 86 million green jobs and support the livelihoods of many more people. An estimated 880 million people worldwide spend part of their time collecting fuelwood or producing charcoal, many of them women. Human populations tend to be low in areas of low-income countries with high forest cover and high forest biodiversity, but poverty rates in these areas tend to be high. Some 252 million people living in forests and savannahs have incomes of less than USD 1.25 per day.

=== Green building designers ===
Design buildings (they can be homes, offices, schools, hospitals, or any other type of building) that in their design, construction or operation, reduce or eliminate negative impacts, and can create positive impacts, on our climate and natural environment. They also try to reduce negative environmental impacts in terms of reducing the contributions to landfill.

=== Marine biologist ===
Analyse the interplay of marine life (animals and plants) with coastal areas and the atmosphere. Marine biologists play a crucial role in measuring the impact of climate change on the world's oceans and overall ocean environmental health.

=== Recycling worker ===
In a typical recycling plant (MRF), the workers are sort labourers, equipment operators, managers (various levels) and maintenance mechanics. Also included are drivers who collect the recyclate from residential, commercial, and non-hazardous industrial sources. Sort labourers 'clean' the stream at various stages of the mechanized sortation process to prevent equipment stoppages and produce bales acceptable to the remanufacturing sector depending on the commodity (metal, paper, cardboard, plastics, etc.). Equipment operators operate heavy equipment designed to help with processes around the plant. Typical equipment includes skid-steers (For cleaning up and moving large amounts of material to bale), forklifts (to move bales and containers of material to places within the plant collected from the sortation process). Managers typically manage the operations/sales and human resources of the MRF so the sortation process requiring sorters and equipment operators runs properly day to day. Maintenance mechanics work to ensure all equipment works properly (such as unjamming a conveyor or fixing electronic equipment associated with the sortation process).

=== Renewable energy engineer ===
Study how to best supply energy from renewable or sustainable sources of energy, such as wind energy, solar power wave energy and biofuels. They focus on ways of producing energy that are deemed to be safer for the environment. An energy engineer was listed as one of the fastest growing jobs in Australia in 2018.

=== Solar photovoltaic (PV) installers ===
Assemble and carry out the installation of solar panels on rooftops or other areas such as ground mounted solar panels. A growing industry for example, has seen job creation and on the job training by a non-profit called GRID Alternatives.

=== Urban grower / urban farmer ===
Responsible for growing food in a city or heavily populated town. Green roof tops can provide locally sourced foods that help protect the environment by reducing the use of pesticides, fossil fuels, and other resources which are often used to grow and transport food to market from larger commercial farms.

=== Water quality scientist ===
Ensure that minimum standards of water quality are met and that these standards ensure human safety and minimise harm to the natural environment. Water quality scientists ensure that these global standards and other compliance requirements are met in three areas - groundwater, surface water (lakes, rivers, ponds, etc.), and drinking water. "The fact that water is the lifeblood of our planet means that there are thousands of opportunities for environmental workers in this area".

=== Wind energy technician ===
Wind technicians install, inspect, maintain, operate and repair wind turbines. Wind technicians identify and fix issues that could cause turbine breakage and ensure proper operation. Historically, this was one of the fastest growing environmental jobs, for example, in 2017. The U.S. Department of Energy has worked with six leading wind turbine manufacturers towards achieving 20 per cent wind power in the United States by 2030. However, the dropping number of students in power engineering programs in recent years means that, the labour requirements needed to facilitate this aim won't be met, unless this trend is reversed.

== By country ==
Eco-innovation drives the creation of environmental jobs worldwide. It simultaneously increases labour productivity and wages while increasing energy and environmental production efficiency.

=== Australia ===
In 2018 Australia generated 21 per cent of its total power from renewables and this sector accounted for more than 20,000 jobs.

=== Brazil ===
According to the International Renewable Energy Agency (IRENA) in 2016, Brazil has 934,000 renewable energy jobs, the second highest in the world. While Brazil is the global leader in liquid biofuels with a total of 845,000 jobs, it also has 41,000 jobs in solar, 36,000 jobs in wind, and 12,000 jobs in small hydro power. A report produced by IRENA in 2018 showed Brazil to have the largest liquid biofuel workforce and 893,000 workers in the overall renewable energy industry. In 2011, green employment accounted for 3.1 million jobs or 2.4 per cent of total employment in 2010 and 3.4 million jobs or 2.6 per cent of total US employment.

=== China ===
China currently produces the most Photovoltaic equipment worldwide and is the world's largest installation market. With respect to employment China accounted for about two thirds of PV employment worldwide, or some 2.2 million jobs in 2018. With respect to total jobs in the renewable energy sector as a whole the number for China was 3.8 million in 2017.

=== Germany ===
Was the leading installer of PV Capacity Installations. until overtaken by China, The United States, India and Japan. In 2018 Germany had 332,000 workers in the renewable energy sector overall.

=== Japan ===
The Thought Leadership Series by the Copenhagen Climate Council published a report in 2009, stating that Japanese solar PV manufacturers represent 26 per cent of the global market and that the solar industry is able to operate without dependence on subsidies. According to a report by the International Renewable Energy Agency, Japanese solar PV jobs increased by 28 per cent in 2014. In 2016, Japan was listed as the third largest employer of solar PV jobs with 377,100 workers, based on direct and indirect labour. In terms of renewable energy, Japan employs 3,000 jobs in liquid biofuels, 5,000 jobs in wind power, 700 jobs in solar cooling and heating, and 2,000 jobs in geothermal energy. In 2018 Japan's slowing economy meant that employment in the solar PV industry fell from 302,000 in 2016 to an estimated 272,000 jobs in 2017.

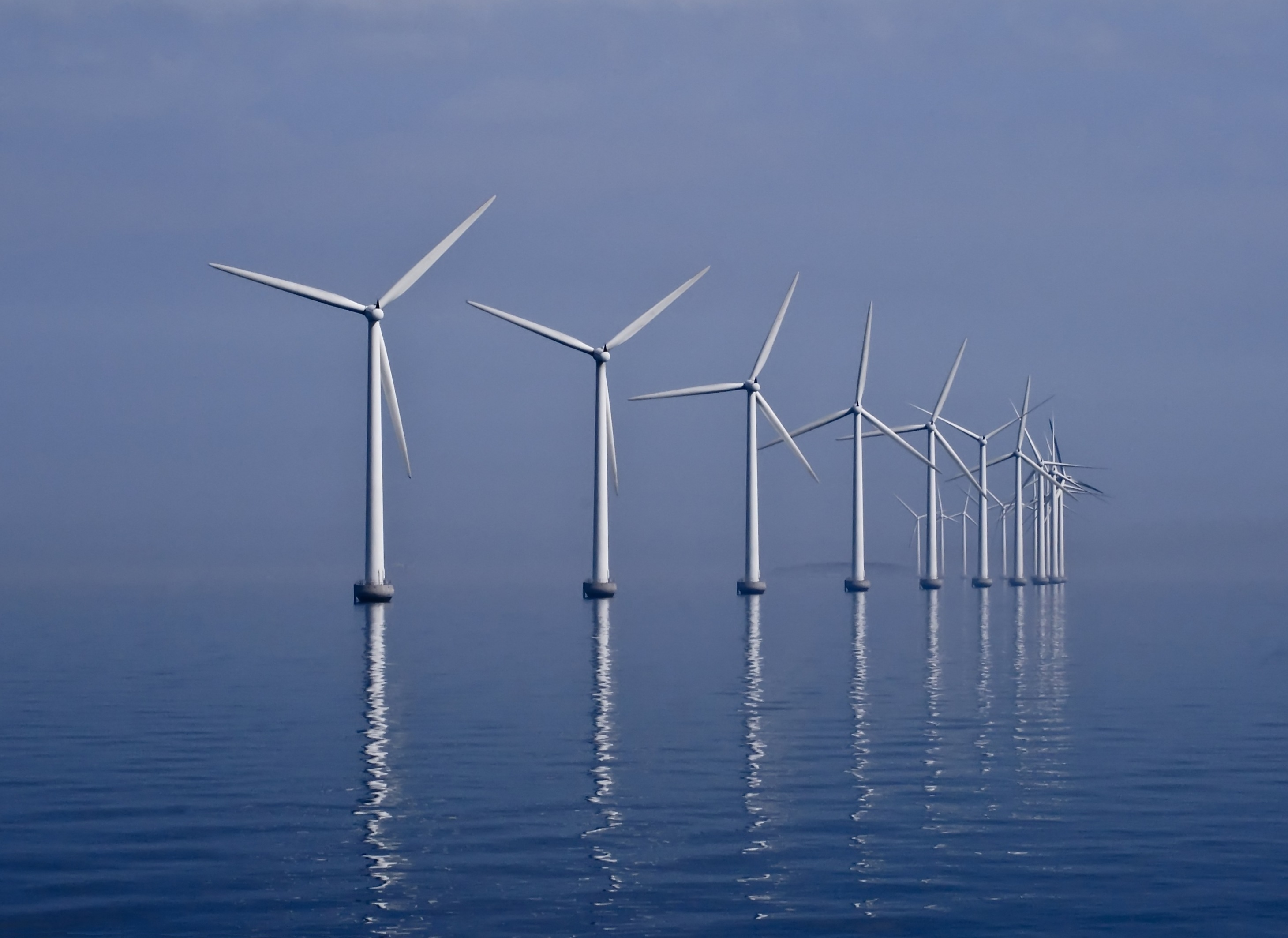
Wind turbine service technicians are projected to continue to be the fastest growing profession in the United States between 2017 and 2024

=== United States ===
In 2010 Green Goods and Services survey found there are 3.1 million Green Goods and Services (GGS) jobs in the United States which accounts for 2.4 per cent of all United States salary and wage employment. There was also a report published by the Bureau of Land Management published 17 April 2017 that states wind turbine service technicians are currently and projected to continue to be the fastest growing profession in the United States between 2017 and 2024 with projected growth of 108.0 per cent

==== Reagan administration 1981-1989 ====
President Reagan said, "Trees cause more pollution than automobiles do." As governor of California, Reagan advocated on behalf of the environment; a large portion of Californian constituents were pro-environment. It states in the book The Enduring Wilderness, "President Ronald Reagan signed more wilderness laws than any other president - forty-three laws designating 10.6 million acres of wilderness in thirty-one states." President Reagan also set a new precedent as president by leasing over twenty million acres of national land for coal, oil, and gas development.

==== Bush administration 2001-2009 ====
The Business Energy Investment Tax credit is a federal policy introduced in 2005 under the Bush administration to promote implementation of green energy sources through a 30 per cent federal tax return in both residential and commercial projects. Individuals and companies were able to apply credit for investments in green energy technologies including solar, fuel cell and wind energy technology The ITC has been extended multiple times, most recently in 2015 through a multi-year extension that will maintain the 30 per cent return up until 2019, afterward decreasing to 26 per cent until 2020 and 22 per cent until 2021. After 2021, commercial credits would reduce to 10 per cent and 0 per cent for residential projects. The Solar Energy Industries Association has attributed stability in the growth of solar energy industries in the U.S. to the implementation of the ITC since 2006 Since the implementation of the ITC, the U.S. solar industry has experienced growth in implementation of solar technology, mainly due to the rapidly decreasing overhead costs as the solar industry was spurred to production and development through the ITC. The solar industry is projected to employ over 420,000 individuals by 2020- nearly double of the 260,000 solar workers in 2016- and contribute $30 billion to the United States economy annually.

==== Obama administration 2009-2017 ====
President Obama campaigned under the promise of creating 5 million new green jobs in the United States. President Obamas plan included the American Clean Energy and Security Act of 2009 (ACES) proposed a cap and trade system which would bring in revenue that would be used to invest in clean energy technology creating 5 million new jobs The bill was passed through the house but never made it to the senate floor and therefore was never written into law. Secondly, due to the 2013 Balanced Budget and Emergency Deficit Control Act the federal government "discontinued measuring all green jobs" which makes tracking job growth extremely difficult.

Although it is unclear if President Obama met his 5 million jobs goal, there was significant growth under his administration. As of March 2016 according to a nonpartisan group, Environmental Entrepreneurs, there were 2.5 million jobs in clean energy with 77,088 jobs solely in the wind industry. During this period of time employment in the solar field was also on the rise. According to the 2015 National Solar Census 2015 marked the third consecutive year in which solar growth was at 20 per cent.

Additionally, the American Recovery and Reinvestment Act (ARRA), passed in early 2009, includes provisions for new jobs in industries such as energy, utilities, construction, and manufacturing with a focus toward energy efficiency and more environmentally-friendly practices.

In March 2009, U.S. President Barack Obama appointed Van Jones as Special Advisor for Green Jobs, Enterprise and Innovation at the White House Council on Environmental Quality (CEQ). Following Jones' resignation in September 2009, no further candidates appear to have been appointed to this position.

==== Trump administration 2017–2021 ====
President Trump signed "Presidential Memorandum Regarding the Hiring Freeze" on 23 January 2017

On 23 January 2017 President Trump signed an executive order, "Presidential Memorandum Regarding the Hiring Freeze", regarding a hiring freeze on government positions across the executive branch. Trump placed a hold on grants distributed through the EPA that could amount to $4 billion per year. The measure was recanted days later, but Trump has proclaimed his intent to "drastically cut the EPA". Myron Ebell, a former member of the Trump transition team, when asked about United States Environmental Protection Agency cuts in an interview with Associated Press, responded, "Let's aim [to cut] for half and see how it works out, and then maybe we'll want to go further."

In the 2018 "Make America Great Again Blueprint", the Trump administration projected EPA funding cuts of 31 per cent and discontinued funding for the Clean Power Plan, international climate change programs, and climate change research and partnership programs.

== Policy ==
Flag of the United Nations which jointly launched the Green Jobs Initiative

=== United Nations ===
==== UNEP Green Jobs Initiative ====
In 2008 the United Nations Environment Programme (UNEP), the International Labour Organization (ILO), the International Trade Union Confederation (ITUC), and the International Employers Organization (IEO) jointly launched the Green Jobs Initiative. The purpose is to bring a just transition to a green economy by providing space for workers, employers, and governments to negotiate on policy effective in providing equitable opportunity to green jobs.

=== Just transition ===
Just transition is a concept that emerged in the 1980s through efforts by U.S. trade unions to protect workers' rights and livelihoods as economies shift to sustainable production, primarily protecting workers affected by environmental regulations. Since then, it has evolved and gained global recognition, including having a place in the Paris Agreement in 2015. A just transition focuses on the connection between energy transition and equitable approaches to decarbonization that support broader development goals. A growing number of countries are incorporating just transition strategies to achieve ambitious climate goals, with 38% of 170 countries referring to just transition in their short-term climate plans as of 2022.

=== United States ===
==== Consolidated Appropriations Act 2010 ====
$8 million was invested to produce and measure data on green-collar Jobs and green economic activity through the Department of Labor, the Bureau of Labor Statistics, and Federal agencies (Environmental Protection Agency, Department of Energy and Commerce, Employment and Training Administration). Methods on the approach target business that produce green goods and services and include special employer surveys, aggregate data gathering on employment and wages, and tabulations that distinguish between occupation and industry.

Data collection and upkeep on Green Goods and Services (GGS) jobs has been discontinued due to the Balanced Budget and Emergency Deficit Control Act in 2013. All "measuring green jobs" programs in the US government were eliminated by this Act.

==== USA Green Jobs Act 2007 ====
The Green Jobs Act of 2007 (H.R. 2847), introduced by Reps. Hilda Solis (D-CA) and John Tierney (D-MA), "authorized up to $125 million in funding to establish national and state job training programs, administered by the U.S. Department of Labor, to help address job shortages that are impairing growth in green industries, such as energy efficient buildings and construction, renewable electric power, energy efficient vehicles, and biofuels development." The Energy Independence and Security Act passed in December 2007 incorporates the Green Jobs Act of 2007.

==== Pathways out of Poverty ====
Pathways out of Poverty (POP) is a national workforce training program that was established on 14 August 2009 by the Obama administration and funded by the American Recovery and Reinvestment Act (ARRA) of 2009. POP targets individuals living below or near the poverty level to provide them with skills needed to enter the green job market, focusing on the energy efficiency and renewable energy industries. The training programs focus on teaching basic literacy and job readiness skills. Some of the programs also provide supportive assistance with childcare and transportation to overcome barriers to employment.

==== MillionTrees NYC Training Program ====
(MTTP) provides job training opportunities specifically to low-income, job insecure 18-24 year-olds who have a high school degree or GED. In 2009, secure full-time salaries of twice the New York State minimum wage of $7.25 were provided to graduates of MTTP by a grant from the US Forest Service. Out of the 16 employed graduates that were interviewed for a study by USDA Forest Service Northern Research Station, 75 per cent were male, 25 per cent were female, 81 per cent were black, 19 per cent were brown, 75 per cent had a high school diploma, 19 per cent had a GED, and 6 per cent went to some high school. Most employees with personal support who graduate from MTTP stay in their green job; not all employees have personal support networks.

== Demographics ==
According to the Green Equity Toolkit by Race Forward, green jobs are disproportionately occupied by white men. Historically, the environmental movement has been white, middle- and upper-class. In 1990, minorities consisted of 1.9 per cent (14 out of the 745) of workers for four of the largest environmental organizations (Natural Resources Defense Council, Friends of the Earth, Audubon Society, and Sierra Club); out of sixty-three mainstream environmental organizations, 32 per cent had no minorities staffed, 22 per cent had no board members of colour, 19 per cent had no volunteers of colour, 16 per cent had no members of colour. According to a journal in the Ecology Law Quarterly published in 1992, white people disproportionately occupy green jobs since said jobs address environmental concerns not confronted by low-income people and people of colour. Environmental lawyers (who are disproportionately white, middle- and upper-class) focus on environmental issues based on aesthetics, recreation, and protecting natural lands outside of their communities; they often do not face environmental problems in their communities. Low-income communities and people of colour who face environmental problems, such as pollution, do not often have access or will to seek green jobs due to the immediate health hazards in their communities. Instead of green jobs, they often engage in grassroots environmental activism to prevent mortality in their communities from toxicities, such as superfund sites, landfills, incinerators and other health hazards.

A report published in 2014 titled, The State of Diversity in Environmental Organizations, states there has been increasing racial diversity over the past 50 years, but at a disproportionately slow rate. People of colour consist of 38 per cent of the US population and do not exceed 16 per cent of the staff of the environmental organizations studied (191 conservation and preservation organizations, 74 government environmental agencies, 28 environmental grant-making foundations). Employed ethnic minorities disproportionately occupy lower-ranked positions in environmental organizations and fewer than 13 per cent occupy leadership positions. A small number of environmental organizations have a diversity manager, diversity committee, or collaborate with low-income or ethnic organizations. Environmental organizations rarely recruit from minority-serving institutions, minority professional gatherings, and other pipelines with talented minorities. Minority interns to environmental organizations are hired less often than their white counterparts. Promotions often go to white females in environmental organizations.

== Green jobs and workforce education ==
The National Council for Workforce Education and AED published a report, "Going Green: The Vital Role of Community Colleges in Building a Sustainable Future and Green Workforce" that examines how workforce education and community colleges contribute to the overall efforts in the move toward renewable and clean energy. The report gives examples of initiatives currently in effect nationally as well as offering information as to how to implement programs.

The nuclear power industry is also growing and contributing to the green job sector. The World Nuclear Association released a report in July 2020 titled "Employment in the Nuclear and Wind Electricity Generating Sectors". Overall, the report found that a 100 GWe nuclear fleet will employ perhaps more than three times as many workers as a wind fleet of the same capacity. These statistics highlight growing opportunities for green jobs in the nuclear industry. Green jobs are attractive options as they directly address the climate crisis while also providing competitive pay and good benefits. Nuclear power specifically has the potential of creating thousands of high skilled, long term, local jobs.

In response to high unemployment and a distressed economy workers need skills that are relevant to their specific geographical locations. "Instead of making green jobs we need to make jobs green" says Ken Warden, an administrator in workforce education.

There are many different solar industry jobs. The SEIA maintains a resource for those looking for solar jobs. A 2016 study indicates that the declining coal industry could protect their workers by retraining them for the solar industry. There are also some indications that the solar industry "welcomes coal workers with open arms".

For the forest sector, the Team of Specialists (ToS) from the Food and Agriculture Organizations of the United Nations (FAO) and the United Nations Economic Commission for Europe (ECE) mapped out potential green jobs in the forest sector. The ToS identified 19 fields of activities with 30 examples of forestry jobs listed.

== See also ==
- Career-oriented social networking market
- Corporate social responsibility (CSR)
- Ethical job
- Environmental Job
- Green-collar worker
- The Green Collar Economy
- Voluntary ecological year

== Sources ==
This article incorporates text from a free content work. Licensed under CC BY-SA 3.0 IGO (license statement/permission). Text taken from The State of the World's Forests 2020. Forests, biodiversity and people – In brief, FAO & UNEP, FAO & UNEP.
