= IBM SkillsBuild =

Online education platform

- Website: https://skillsbuild.org

IBM SkillsBuild is a free global education and digital skilling program developed by International Business Machines Corporation (IBM). It provides online learning resources, project-based training, and industry-recognized credentials to adult learners, high school and university students, and educators. The program is delivered through an open online platform as well as through customized experiences with a network of partner organizations worldwide.

== History ==
IBM has maintained a long-standing involvement in education and workforce development. Company founder Thomas J. Watson Sr. emphasized learning as a path to personal and professional advancement, stating that “there is no saturation point in education.” Throughout its history, IBM has invested in primary and secondary education initiatives to equip students with skills relevant to the evolving labor market.

IBM SkillsBuild was launched in 2020 as part of the company’s broader efforts to expand access to free digital education and close global skills gaps. It builds on earlier IBM education initiatives such as Pathways in Technology Early College High Schools (P-TECH).

In October 2021, IBM announced a commitment to provide skills training to 30 million people worldwide by 2030. In September 2023, the company pledged to train two million learners in AI by the end of 2026. In February 2025, IBM expanded the SkillsBuild program to include AI training for university student developers. Later that year, in September 2025, IBM pledged to train two million people in the United States in AI skills by 2028.

== See also ==
- IBM Research
