= Waves of economic development =

Economic development research has currently identified five phases, or "waves" of economic development practice. The differences between these waves are shaped by historical factors, the economic climate during historical periods, and leaders' response to these forces, which over time have created five strategies that differ from their predecessors. The five waves have all been designed to accomplish the same goal: to help entrepreneurs and businesses discover and expand markets for their services. Often these waves operate concurrently (thus, overlapping), or within a single economic development plan.

== First-wave economic development ==
First-wave economic development, or the Growth Promotion Approach, is characterized by a focus on industrial recruitment through financial incentives such as tax abatement and loans in order to lower costs associated with land, infrastructure, and labor. This method of business attraction was first used in the United States in the 1930s as a response to the Great Depression. The economic development activities in this phase are sometimes called "smokestack-chasing."

=== Smokestack-Chasing ===
This approach to economic development has its foundation in the "boosterism" of small towns in early North America. Typically in this wave, local economic developers focus attention on attracting one major employer to the region - be it a factory, mine, college, or prison. The first step in smokestack-chasing is to promote the location to the potential employer. Next, the economic developer seeks to improve the likelihood of the employer locating within the area by providing incentives (e.g., cheap land or labor, lax environmental regulations). Detractors of this form of economic development have labeled it haphazard and suggested that smokestack-chasing is "likely to prove ineffective," while others have said the result of smokestack-chasing is likely mixed, with increases in short-term job growth and per capita income as well as political support.

== Second-wave economic development ==
Second-wave development strategies have their roots in the increase of worldwide competition, the descent of American manufacturing, and the critical evaluations of first-wave techniques of the late 1960s. These critiques labeled first-wave development as a zero-sum game between elites that instead of creating jobs merely transferred opportunities from one area to another at the benefit of "land-based" elites. The first use of second-wave strategies was in the late 1960s and early 70s. In second-wave economic development, practitioners began to use strategies to retain and expand existing firms. They also included a focus on small business development through entrepreneurial tools like loans and enterprise zones.

== Third-wave economic development ==
Third-wave was first identified in the early 1990s, and is marked by a declining emphasis on industrial attraction and retention and an increasing focus on strategies such as public-private partnerships, establishing regional networks, developing industrial clusters, and increasing human capital.

Third-wave economic development focuses on “broadening of the foundation for effective economic development.” It also stresses the importance of nurturing and advancing local and sectoral resources resulting in more complex economic development planning. States increasingly see themselves as key players in an evolving international economic competition – one that requires third-wave efforts to shift to an industry-wide perspective, and in many instances improve the socio-economic standing of its citizens through equity planning during the strategic economic development process.

== Fourth-wave economic development ==
This wave is also called sustainable economic development, and includes strategies that enhance environmental quality and self-sufficiency. In this context, sustainability refers to the process economic developers employ to determine a balanced approach to development that takes into consideration "a full range of economic, environmental, and social characteristics that together comprise 'community,'" or development that reconciles historically conflicting stakes: promotion of the economy, equitable distribution of economic growth, and the preservation of the natural environment.

=== Sustainable Local Economic Development (SLED) ===
This wave has also been referred to as sustainable local economic development (SLED) because of the emphasis on local community.

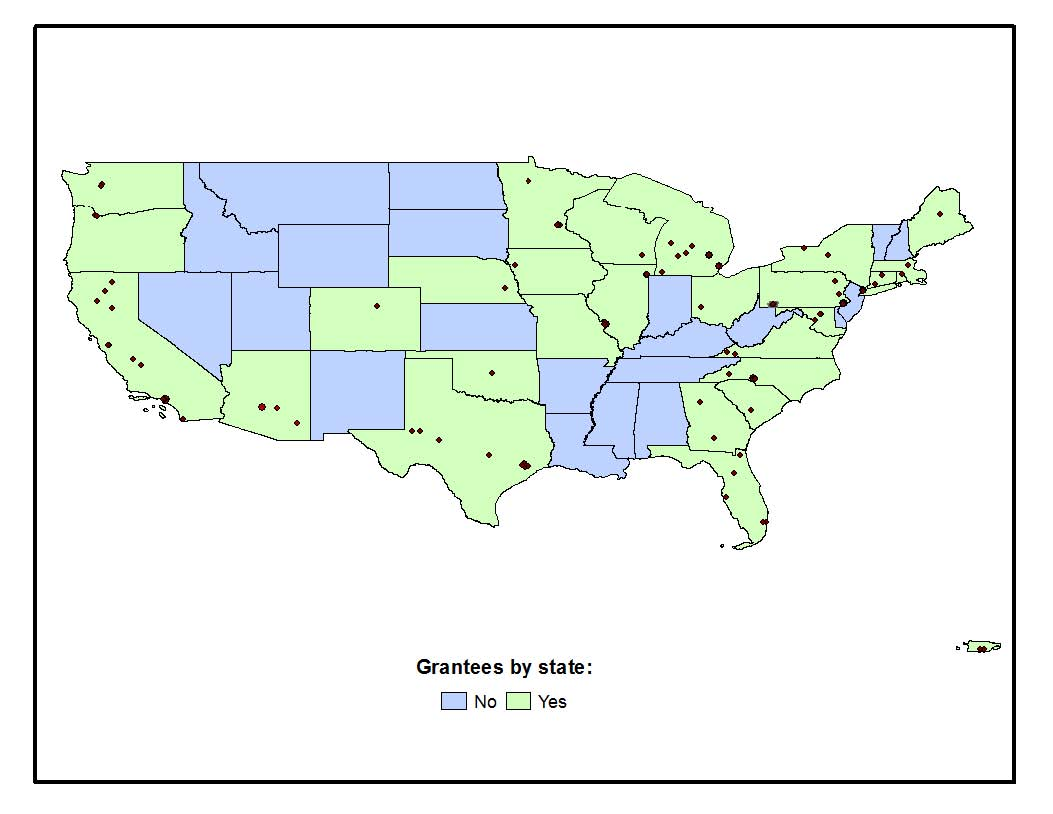
Pathways Out of Poverty Locations

Although there are various definitions of sustainability or SLED, most definitions share the following principles:

- quality of life (the connection between environment, economy, and social justice)
- fairness and equity
- participation and partnership
- environmental stewardship
- concerns for our future and the precautionary principle

An example of this approach applied to workforce training is the U.S. program Pathways out of Poverty.

== Fifth-wave economic development ==
The fifth-wave of economic development began in the 1990s with a two-fold interest in providing market solutions and regional strategies for development. The idea of a comparative advantage has been integral to the development of the fifth-wave. This wave has been marked by economic developers who work to emphasize unmet demand, function as a go-between with government to identify financing, and build partnerships for minority businesses between the public and private sector. The fifth-wave has led to concerns about displacement of impoverished populations due to gentrification.
