= Designation of workers by collar color =

Employment classification

Working individuals can be classified according to the colors of the collars traditionally worn at their workplace. These commonly reflect one's occupation within a broad class, or sometimes gender. White-collar workers are named for the white-collared shirts that were fashionable among office workers in the early and mid-20th century. Blue-collar workers are referred to as such because in the early 20th century, they usually wore sturdy, inexpensive clothing that did not show dirt easily, such as blue denim or cambric shirts. In the modern era, these terms have become metaphorical and are not a description of typical apparel.

Various other "collar" descriptions exist as well, although none have received the kind of broad use in American English as the traditional white-collar and blue-collar distinction.

== White collar ==
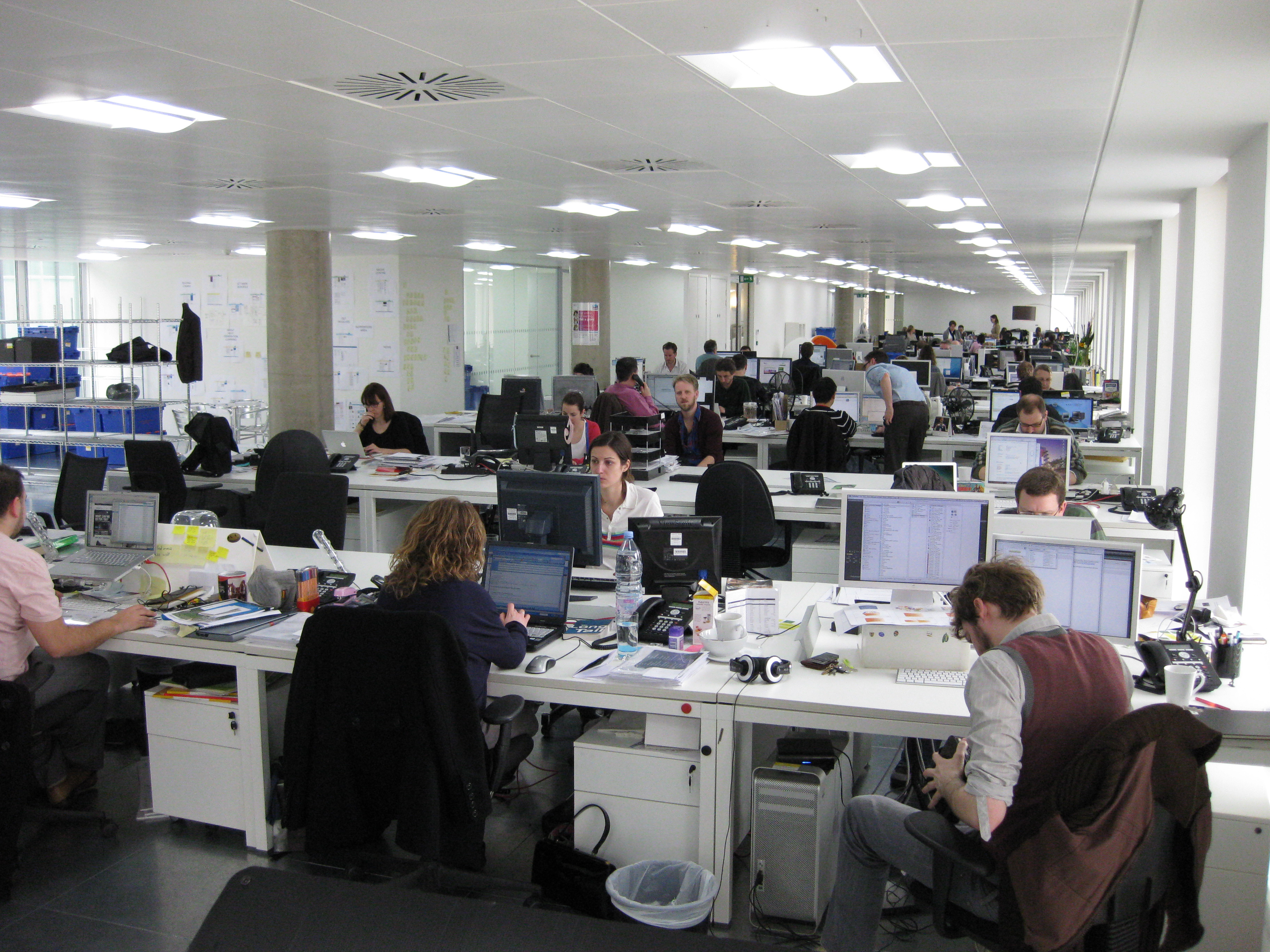
Office workers at work in London, doing a typical "white-collar" job.

The term "white-collar worker" was coined in the 1930s by Upton Sinclair, an American writer who referenced the word in connection to clerical, administrative and managerial functions during the 1930s. A white-collar worker is a salaried professional, typically referring to general office workers and management.

== Blue collar ==
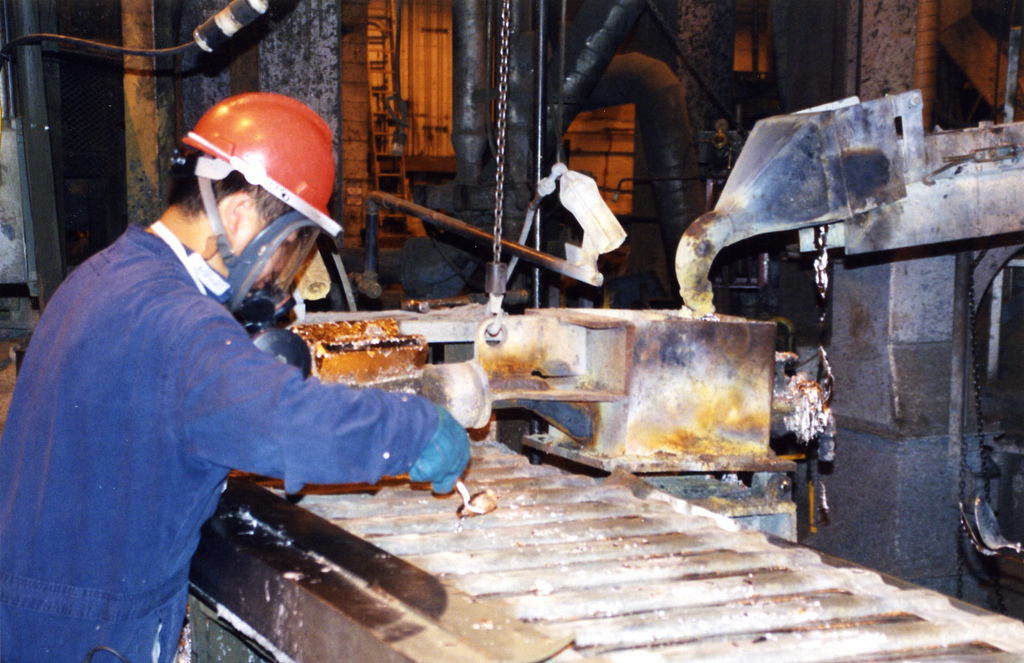
A manual laborer at work in a metal recycling plant, doing a typical "blue-collar" job

A blue-collar worker is a member of the working class who performs manual labor and either earns an hourly wage or is paid piece rate for the amount of work done. The work done by a blue-collar worker often consists of manual labor, rather than knowledge work. This term was first used in 1924.

== Pink collar ==
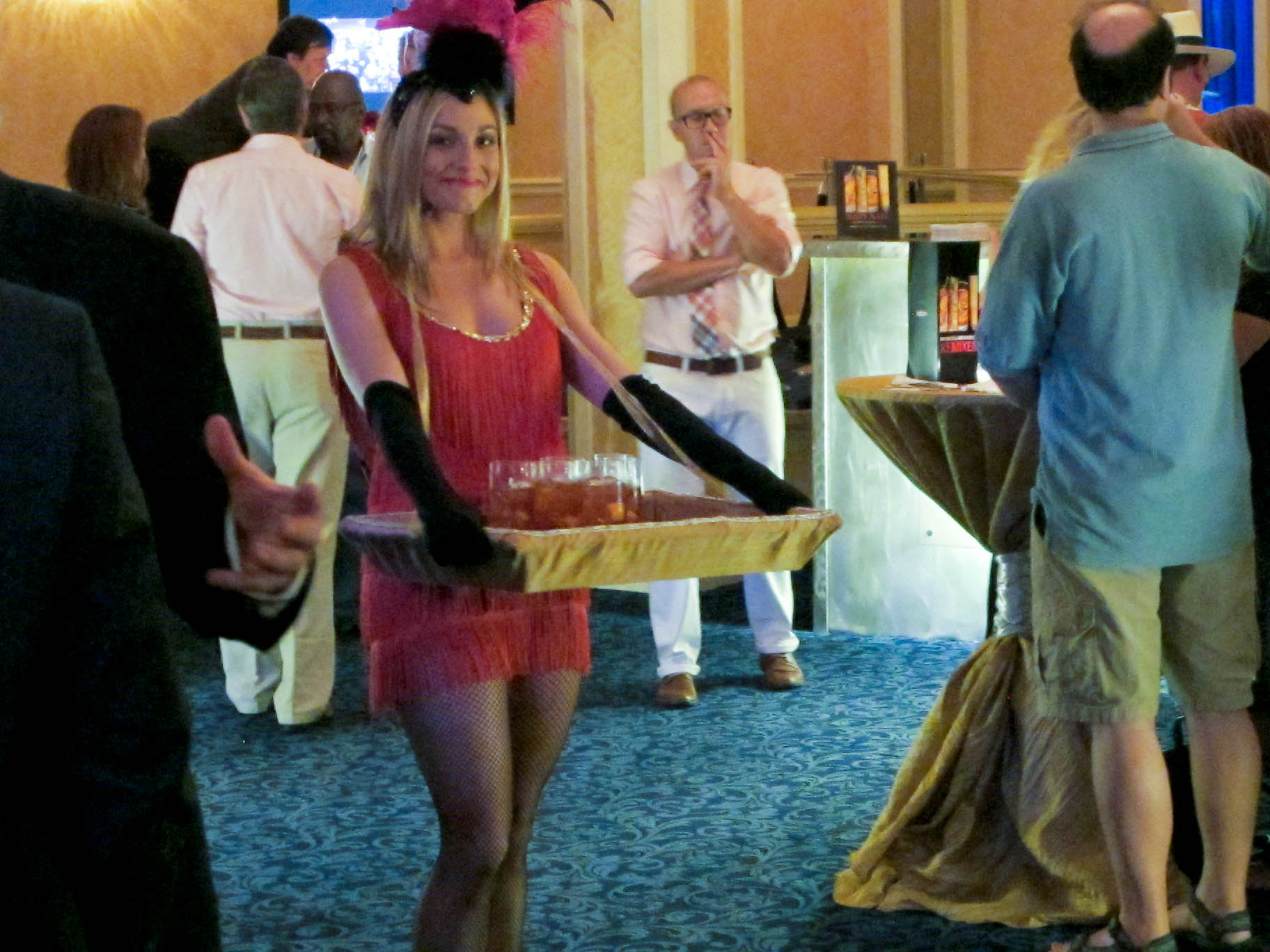
A waitress at work in New Orleans, doing a typical "pink-collar" job.

A pink-collar worker is someone who works in a position traditionally held by women. Jobs commonly referred to as "pink-collar" include nursing, education and customer service. The term was coined in the late 1970s as a phrase to describe jobs that were typically held by women.

== Other classifications ==
There are a number of other terms used less frequently, or which translate to English from common use in other languages. These categories include:

- Red collar – In China, it refers to Communist Party officials in private companies.
- New collar – Develops technical and soft skills through nontraditional education paths.
- No collar – Artists and "free spirits" who tend to prioritize passion and personal growth over financial gain. This term was popularized on the reality game show Survivor: Worlds Apart, which used No Collar (in addition to White and Blue Collar) as the tribal divisions.
- Clerical collar – Members of the clergy or other ordained religious professionals.
- Orange collar – Prison laborers, named for the orange jumpsuits commonly worn by inmates.
- Green collar – Usually referring a wide range of professions relating to the environment and renewable energy, but can also refer to military personnel.
- Purple collar - Jobs that require a combination of blue-collar and white-collar skills, often in technical fields, and requiring the worker to hold specialized degrees, licenses, or certifications. Possible examples are IT support specialists, and skilled trades supervisors.
- Black collar – Manual laborers in industries in which workers generally become very dirty, such as mining or oil-drilling. Or, in a modern context, creative professionals who wear black clothing, such as in performing arts, design and architecture. It may also refer to illegal employment and the black market.
- Gray collar – Refers to labor which blurs the line between blue- and white-collar work. Gray collar work requires both physical and intellectual labour, and may require specialized training or college degrees. Commonly given examples of gray collar workers are first responders, nurses, conservationists, and pilots.
- Brass collar – Refers to an official representative of the railroad.
- Rainbow collar – LGBTQ workers, who are more likely to work in fields that are non-exclusive to their same-gender.
- Gold collar - Highly skilled professionals who are in high demand and highly paid workers in specialized career fields (e.g, doctors, lawyers, senior executives). Coined by Robert Kelley in his book, The Gold Collar Worker (1985).

== See also ==
- Lists of occupations
