= Public Use Microdata Area =

A Public Use Microdata Area (PUMA) is a geographic unit used by the US Census for providing statistical and demographic information. Each PUMA contains at least 100,000 people. PUMAs do not overlap, and are contained within a single state. PUMAs were first created for the 1990 Census. As of 2022, based on the results of the 2020 Census, there are 2,487 PUMAs.

PUMAs allow the Census to publish census data for sub-state areas throughout every state. For example, the ACS publishes detailed data every year, but due to their sampling procedure only publishes data for census area that have more than 65,000 People. Only seven of the 55 counties of West Virginia were large enough to receive estimates from the 2006 ACS. In contrast, all 12 PUMAs that partition West Virginia received 2006 ACS estimates.

The state governments drew PUMA boundaries for the 2000 Census, to allow reporting of detailed data for all areas. There were a total of 2,071 PUMAs in the 2000 Census.

== PUMAs by State ==
Count of PUMAs by state or territory based on Census 2020 results
State or Territory	Count of PUMAs, 2020	Total Population	Average Population per PUMA
Alabama	39	5,024,279	128,828
Alaska	5	733,391	146,678
Arizona	57	7,151,502	125,465
Arkansas	20	3,011,524	150,576
California	281	39,538,223	140,705
Colorado	45	5,773,714	128,305
Connecticut	25	3,605,944	144,238
Delaware	8	989,948	123,744
District of Columbia	6	689,545	114,924
Florida	168	21,538,187	128,203
Georgia	77	10,711,908	139,116
Guam	1	153,836	153,836
Hawaii	10	1,455,271	145,527
Idaho	14	1,839,106	131,365
Illinois	88	12,812,508	145,597
Indiana	51	6,785,528	133,050
Iowa	24	3,190,369	132,932
Kansas	21	2,937,880	139,899
Kentucky	35	4,505,836	128,738
Louisiana	35	4,657,757	133,079
Maine	10	1,362,359	136,236
Maryland	48	6,177,224	128,692
Massachusetts	54	7,029,917	130,184
Michigan	68	10,077,331	148,196
Minnesota	48	5,706,494	118,885
Mississippi	21	2,961,279	141,013
Missouri	47	6,154,913	130,956
Montana	8	1,084,225	135,528
Nebraska	14	1,961,504	140,107
Nevada	20	3,104,614	155,231
New Hampshire	10	1,377,529	137,753
New Jersey	74	9,288,994	125,527
New Mexico	17	2,117,522	124,560
New York	144	20,201,249	140,286
North Carolina	76	10,439,388	137,360
North Dakota	6	779,094	129,849
Ohio	90	11,799,448	131,105
Oklahoma	31	3,959,353	127,721
Oregon	35	4,237,256	121,064
Pennsylvania	95	13,002,700	136,871
Puerto Rico	24	3,285,874	136,911
Rhode Island	7	1,097,379	156,768
South Carolina	41	5,118,425	124,840
South Dakota	6	886,667	147,778
Tennessee	58	6,910,840	119,152
Texas	217	29,145,505	134,311
Utah	23	3,271,616	142,244
Vermont	4	643,077	160,769
Virginia	60	8,631,393	143,857
Washington	61	7,705,281	126,316
West Virginia	12	1,793,716	149,476
Wisconsin	43	5,893,718	137,063
Wyoming	5	576,851	115,370
TOTAL	2,487	334,888,991	134,656

== See also ==
- Census tract
- Census block
