= Pathways in Technology Early College High School =

Public school in New York City

Coordinates: 40.67591°N 73.93896°W

Pathways in Technology Early College High School (P-TECH) is a New York City public high school that opened in September 2011. It was developed through a partnership between IBM, City University of New York - City Tech, and the New York City Department of Education. The school focuses on post-secondary Information Technology. In grades 9-14, students undertake "hollege" - a program combining high school and two years of college. The current principal is Rashid Davis.

The school is located in the same building as Paul Robeson High School, in the Crown Heights neighborhood of Brooklyn.

== Curriculum ==
The students at the school focus on STEM (Science, Engineering, Technology & Math) subject areas. Further focus is on Information Technology, with the school aiming to "put technology at the forefront of students' experiences". The school also has an early college high school program, which aims to prepare students for college.

During high school, students take classes at New York City College of Technology, and have an opportunity to earn an associate degree at no cost. After 4 years at P-TECH, students may finish their undergraduate studies at City Tech or another institution, or move directly to a career.

Additionally, students can take part in internships, with IBM and the other partner organizations providing mentors for students.

== Student body ==
P-TECH is a small school, with classes of around 100 students each year. It opened in 2011 with a 9th grade class, growing over the next three years to an expected enrollment of 400-450. Unlike the city's specialized high schools, students are admitted to P-TECH on the basis of interest only. It is a limited-unscreened school, meaning that preference is given to students who express interest in the school either by attending an information session or through other means. There is no exam required.

The only requirements for students is an interest in technology/STEM and an expanded learning time to go past the high school content into more advanced topics.

== Notable moments ==
In October 2013, P-TECH High School was visited by President Barack Obama as a part of his message to promote STEM careers and access to college.

In January 2015, with the partnership of Google and Paramount Pictures, as well as the assistance of Bruce Gordon and Tawana Tibbs, P-TECH High School became the only school in the country to receive a free and private screening of the movie SELMA.
