= Grey-collar worker =

Employed people not classified as white- or blue collar

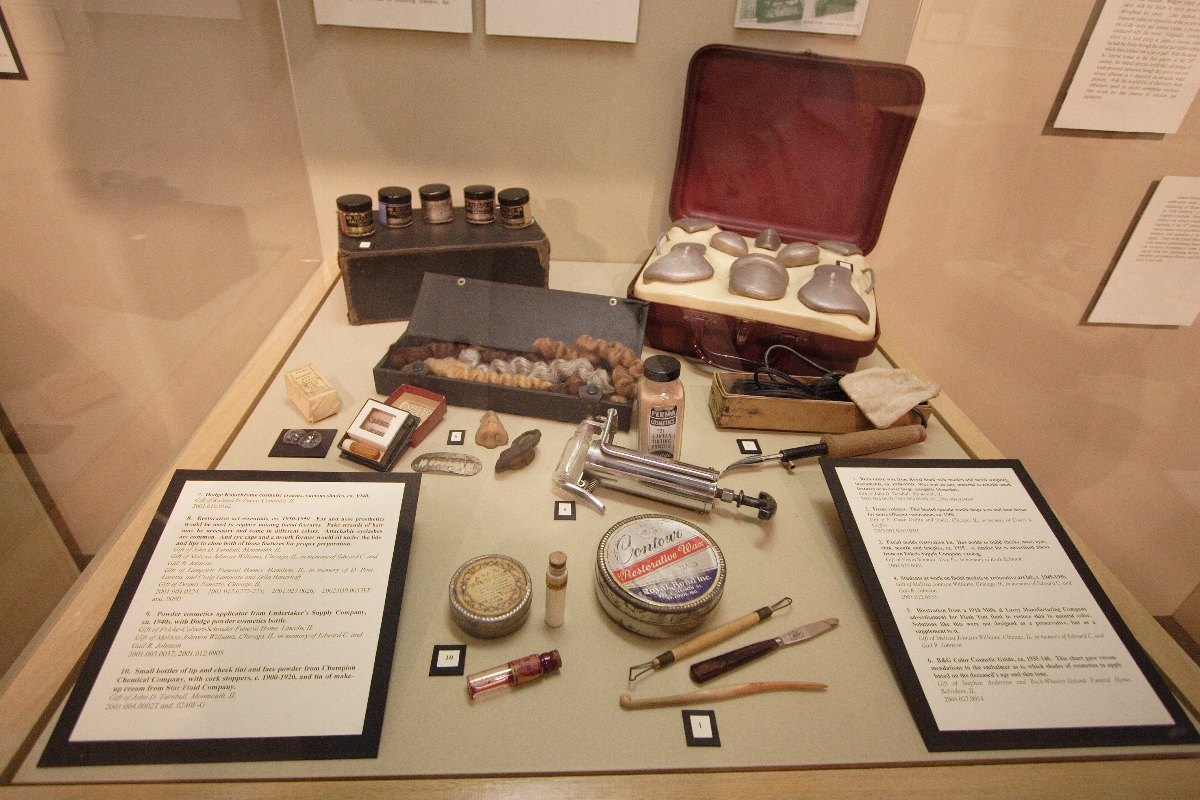
Mortician's restorative tools, Museum of Funeral Customs, Springfield, Illinois.

Grey-collar refers to professions where the nature of the work cannot easily be classified as blue-collar or white-collar. As such, the category represents an intermediary between blue-collar and white-collar work that combines elements of both categories in regard to the nature of the work and the required type of training, licensure, and formal education. In general, the category requires more intellectual labor than would be required of a blue-collar profession and more physical labor than would be required of a white-collar profession. The concept helps address, but does not fully resolve, classist attitudes towards and misconceptions about different professions.

== Definition ==
The concept is more loosely defined than the dichotomy of blue- vs white- collar, and is therefore somewhat controversial. Grey-collar may be interpreted as a spectrum between the two extremes of blue- and white- collar. Due to the open-ended nature of the concept and the issues with treating blue- and white- collar as a rigid binary, a wide range of professions may be considered grey-collar. As such, definitions of the category may differ across contexts and in individual interpretation.

The Pittsburgh Post-Gazette wrote that another definition for grey collar could be the underemployed white collar worker.

Charles Brecher of the Citizens Budget Commission and the Partnership for New York City defined it as sub-blue-collar jobs: "maintenance and custodial".

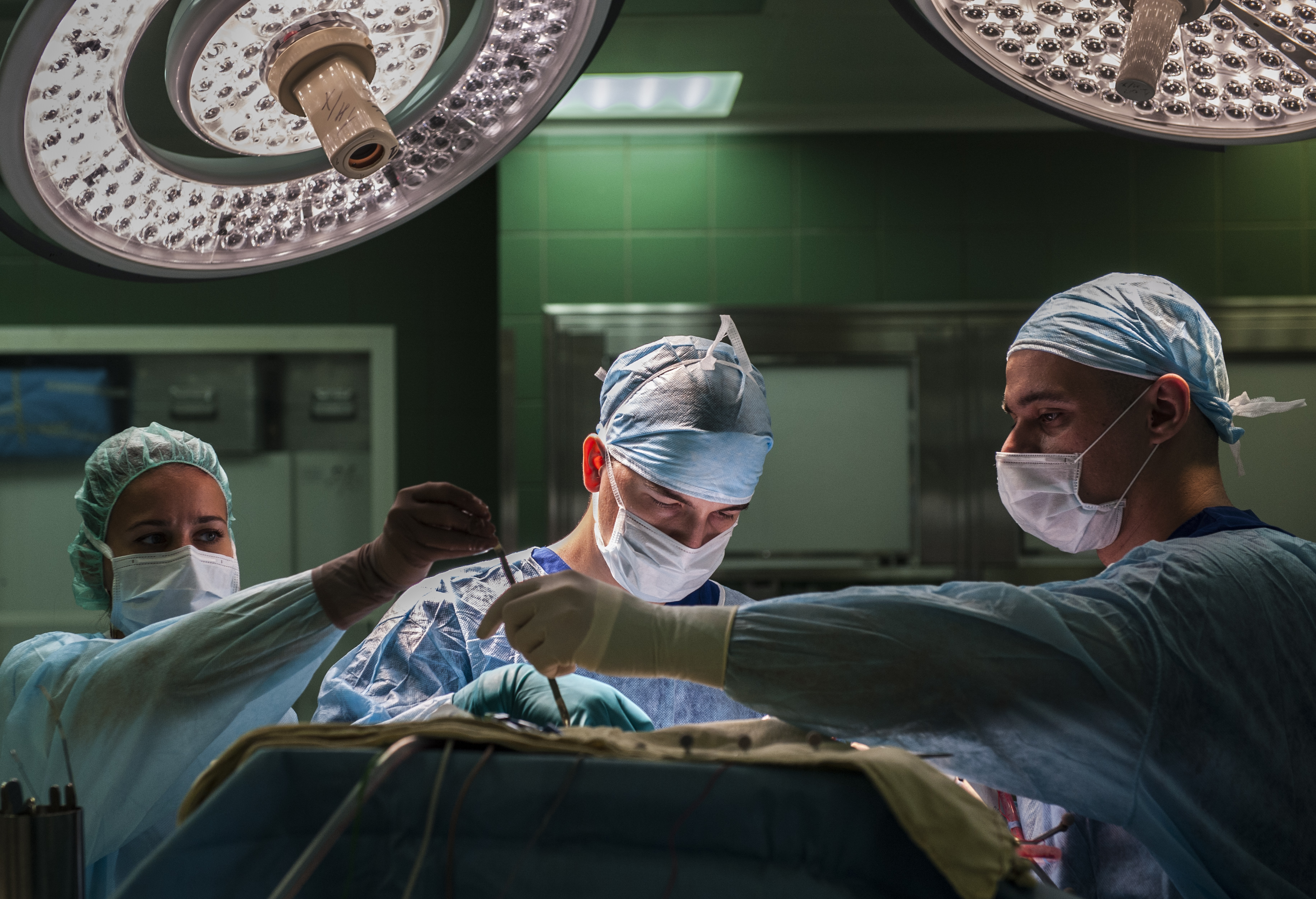
Medical doctors (physicians) performing surgery.

The term may also be used to describe elderly individuals working beyond the typical age of retirement, regardless of profession type.

== Examples ==
For example, a physician (medical doctor) is typically categorized as a white-collar profession. However, the physical nature of performing hands-on procedures, like surgery, could place medical doctors into the grey-collar profession despite the extensive nature of academic requirements, high wages, and exclusivity of the profession. Such factors are typically and inaccurately associated with the concept of a white-collar profession and help form the basis for the classist belief that white-collar workers are inherently superior people overall relative to blue-collar workers.

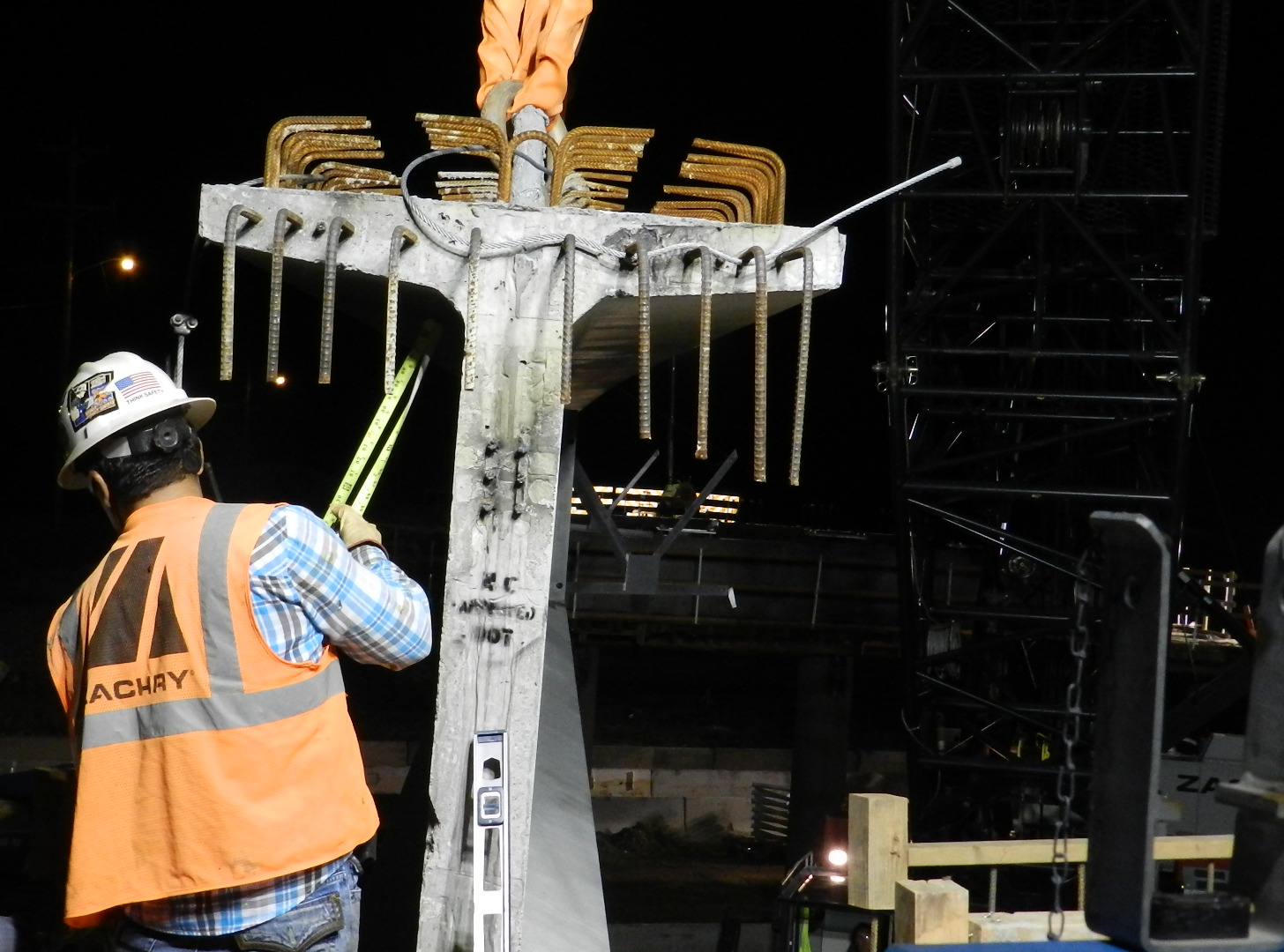
Construction foreman checking the alignment and placement of a road bridge girder

Grey-collar positions may represent a form of career advancement wherein a skilled tradesperson takes on managerial duties supervising others who perform manual labor and/or skilled trades. For example, the duties of a construction foreman incorporate elements of both blue- and white- collar work. Similarly, an entrepreneurial tradesperson who owns their own business performing their trade may be classed as grey-collar. Such transitions may or may not require additional licensure and/or formal education.

There may also be overlap with similarly loosely defined work categories, such as pink collar work. For example, the nursing profession and other allied health professions.

== Classification issues and insurance requirements ==
However, grey-collar does not solely refer to supervisory roles. Any profession that incorporates elements of both blue- and white- collar may be categorized as grey-collar. Furthermore, specialization and/or the manner in which work is performed may affect into which category a particular worker falls. As such, some professions may not neatly fall into the blue-collar or grey-collar categories, as some professionals in the career may be required to perform intellectual labor while others may not.

For example, a plumber who specializes in repair may be considered a grey-collar worker due to the amount of intellectual work required to diagnose why a plumbing system is malfunctioning. Conversely, a plumber who specializes in new construction or renovation may be classed as blue-collar if they lack professional autonomy in deciding how the plumbing system should be laid out; i.e. they are expected to strictly adhere to construction plans that were drafted by an engineer or other white-collar worker. However, a new construction or renovation plumber who is tasked with performing the intellectual work of determining how to layout the new plumbing systems may be considered grey-collar.

The fields that most recognize the differences between blue-collar and grey-collar are human resources and the insurance industry. Due to the blended nature of the work, grey-collar professionals may have more complex insurance requirements compared to blue- and white-collar workers.

For example, a paramedic is likely to be at increased risk of occupational injury due to the physical aspects of the job. They are also at risk of increased risk of causing harm to others due to both the physical aspects and the intellectual aspects of the job. Medical malpractice may be the result of an incorrectly performed medical procedure; ie. a blue-collar aspect of the job, or it may be the result of inadequate treatment decisions due to an inaccurate field diagnosis or lack of necessary foundational medical knowledge to be able to use standing orders from a physician safely and correctly; ie. a white-collar aspect of the job. As such, the workers compensation liability and the personal injury liability for injury to non-employees may be greater for the employer relative to blue- or white-collar professions.

== See also ==
- Designation of workers by collar color
