= Causes of Jane Austen's death =

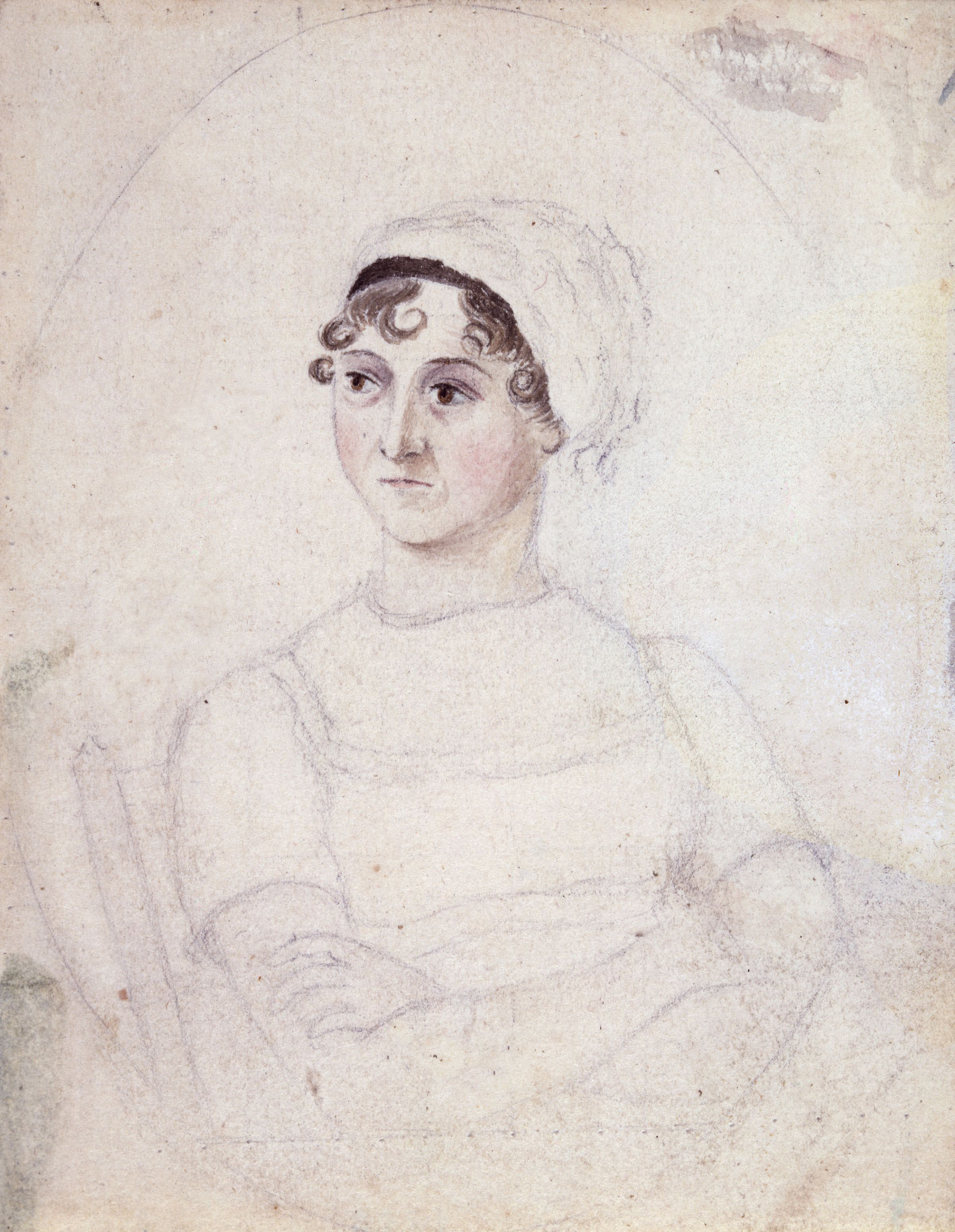
Watercolor portrait of Jane Austen (1775–1817) painted around 1810, by her sister Cassandra Austen. National Portrait Gallery, London.

The causes of Jane Austen's death, which occurred on July 18, 1817 when she was 41 years old, following an undetermined illness that lasted about a year, have been discussed retrospectively by doctors whose conclusions have subsequently been taken up and analyzed by biographers of Jane Austen, one of the most widely read and acclaimed English writers.

The two main hypotheses are that of Addison's disease, put forward in 1964 by the English surgeon Zachary Cope (1881–1974), and that of Hodgkin's disease, first mentioned concisely the same year by Dr. F. A. Bevan, (Note: Dr Frank Arthur Bevan (1902–1974) was a Woodstock-based general practitioner, known during his lifetime for his boundless activity and whose interests extended far beyond medicine to many areas of culture, according to his obituary published by the BMJ (Bevan, F.A. (December 7, 1974). "TD, MB, BS, FRCGP" (PDF). British Medical Journal. 4 (5944): 600.)) then developed and argued in 2005 by the Australian Annette Upfal, professor of British literature at the University of Queensland. In the 2010s, the British Library speculated she died of arsenic poisoning based on 3 pairs of eyeglasses owned by Austen.

The discussion is based primarily on Jane Austen's writings on her own clinical case. It does not rule out the possibility of tuberculosis, which was the usual etiology of Addison's disease in the 19th century.

== Case history ==
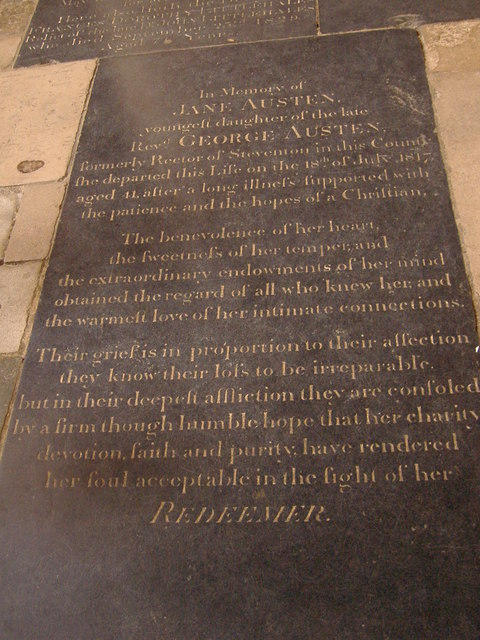
Jane Austen's tomb in Winchester Cathedral.

The story of Jane Austen's illness has been reconstructed by Annette Upfal, who indicates at the end of her work that she has received the approval of Australian immunologist Ian Frazer.

Jane Austen was born four weeks postterm. In childhood and young adulthood, she suffered from serious infections: typhus, which it has become conventional to claim she "almost died" of at the age of seven, (Note: According to Linda Robinson Walker, the opinion that typhus nearly caused Jane's death is not expressed by any contemporary account of Jane Austen. It was first put forward in 1949 by Elizabeth Jenkins ( Jenkins, Elizabeth (1949). Jane Austen. New York: Minerva.) and subsequently repeated, uncredited and unverified, by Halperin, Le Faye, Nokes, Tucker and Tomalin.) while attending Mrs Ann Cawley's school in Southampton; chronic conjunctivitis; whooping cough, which occurred at the age of 30 and was considered "unusually severe"; and otitis externa (side unspecified), in 1808, treated by applying sweet almond oil to the external auditory canal. In 1813, she repeatedly showed signs of facial neuralgia (attributed by A. Upfal to trigeminal shingles) severe enough to force her to appear in public with "a cushion pressed to her face" ("Jane was a very private person, and the pain must have been intense for her to walk out in public with a cushion pressed to her face"). Towards the end of the winter of 1815, she began to complain of generalized pruritus, without a rash.

The onset of her fatal affliction is generally placed in the early months of 1816, around her fortieth birthday, when it became clear to those around her that she was seriously ill. Her troubles consisted of insidious weakness, asthenia and progressive wasting. She had frequent "bilious attacks" (vomiting) and her face changed color, becoming "black and white". From February 1817, she was subject to regular bouts of high fever, during which she sometimes lost consciousness. She died during one of these attacks.

== Symptom analysis ==
The retrospective diagnosis of the illness that led to the novelist's death is based on the following symptoms and clinical signs, which relate only to the last year of Jane Austen's life. This symptomological inventory is largely based on the work of Cope and Upfal.

=== General signs ===
All the authors emphasize the rapid deterioration in the patient's general condition, with weight loss and weakening in the space of a few months. Asthenia was severe, and brief fainting spells occurred regularly. Febrile attacks lasting several days were observed intermittently from February 1817 onwards. On the other hand, frequent "attacks of bile" are mentioned in Jane Austen's letters, and probably refer to nausea and vomiting.

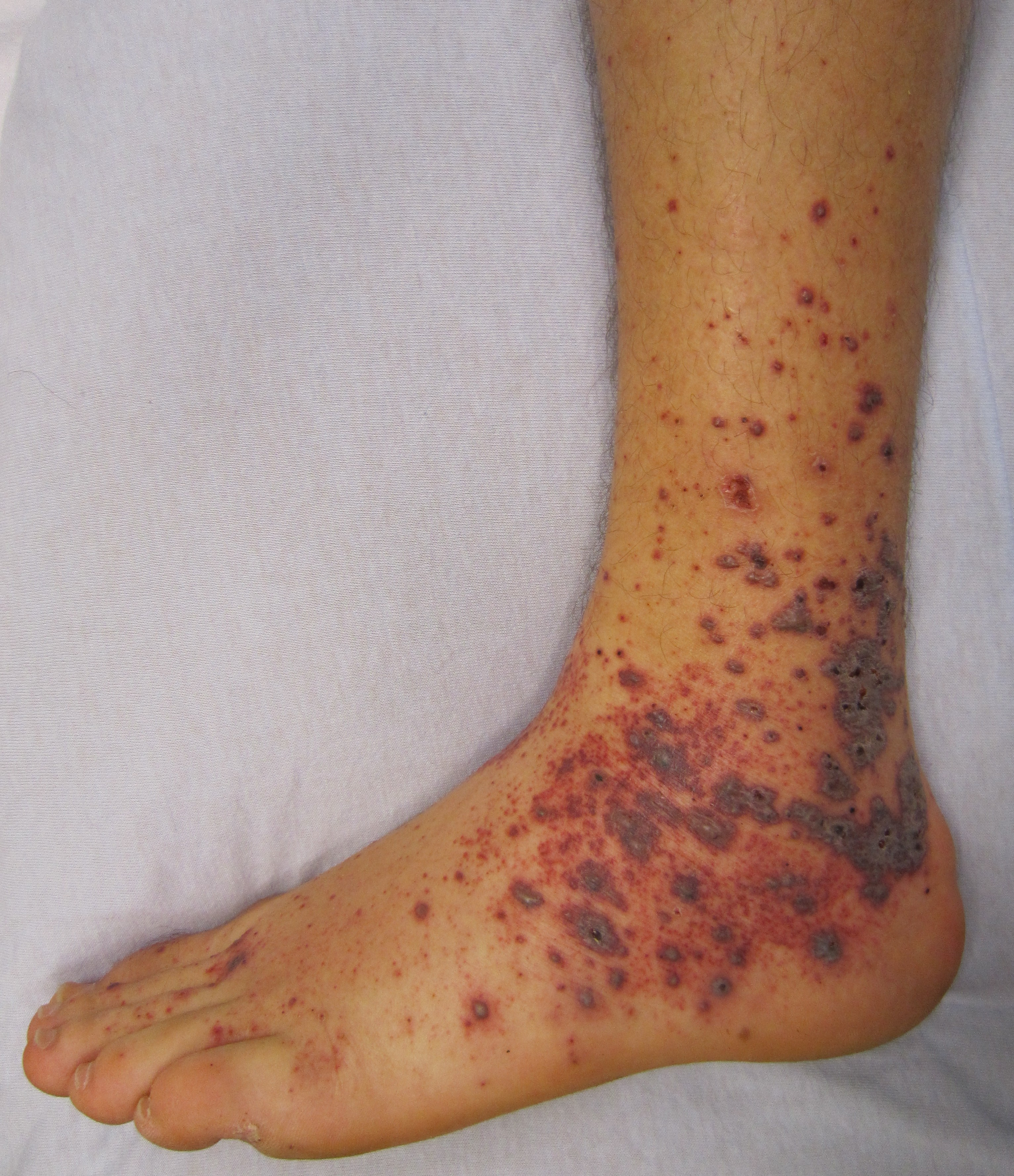
Confluent petechia in a purpura affected area.

=== Cutaneous signs ===
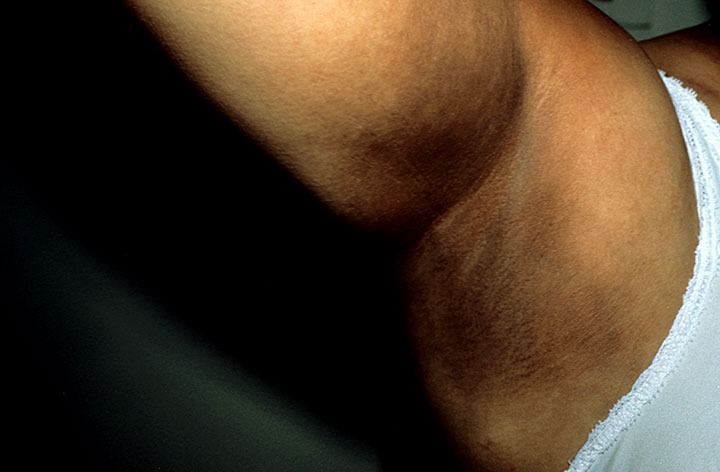
Localized hyperpigmentation in Addison's disease: pseudo-acanthosis nigricans of the axillary region.

In her letter to Fanny Knight dated March 23, 1817, Jane Austen referred to the color of her skin, which had darkened in places. There is little evidence, however, as to the exact mechanism of this color change, which may correspond either to hyperpigmentation as part of melanoderma, or to spontaneous subcutaneous hemorrhages (petechia or ecchymoses).

== Speculative differential diagnosis ==
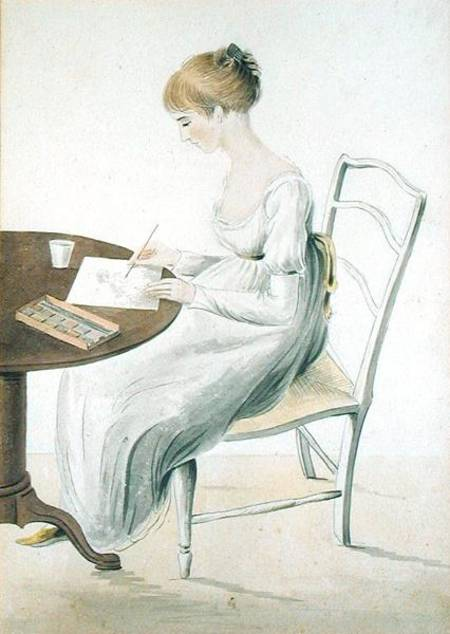
Fanny Knight (1793–1882), one of Jane Austen's nieces, was the recipient of many letters in which her aunt commented on her illness. Watercolor painted by Cassandra Austen.

All authors agree that sources on Jane Austen's final illness are too limited to allow a diagnosis of certainty. Her doctors left no notes, and her family spoke only reluctantly of her illness. Moreover, her most informative letters were destroyed by her sister Cassandra after her death. (Note: In her 1995 introduction to the third edition of Jane Austen's letters, Deirdre Le Faye reports that Jane Austen's sister Cassandra had destroyed some of the novelist's letters and removed passages from others. According to Deirdre Le Faye, Cassandra did this because Jane Austen described the physical symptoms of her illness too fully: see Le Faye (1995), p. 15. As a result, the information that survives today consists of "a few comments made by the patient herself in the letters that have survived".) Cope asserts that Jane Austen was an accurate observer, and although to the end she downplayed her health problems, her formal statements can be trusted. (Note: Cope does not specify the origin of his reliance on Jane Austen's descriptions of his symptoms.) In addition to Jane Austen's own observations, Cope consulted the recollections of one of the patient's nieces, Caroline Austen, as well as an 1817 letter written by Cassandra Austen and addressed to Fanny Knight.

=== Addison's disease ===
A diagnosis of Addison's disease was proposed in 1964 by a famous surgeon, Sir Vincent Zachary Cope, in a short two-page article published in the British Medical Journal. Addison's disease is a chronic progressive adrenal insufficiency, first described in 1855 by Thomas Addison. The cardinal signs include asthenia, low blood pressure, anorexia (with weight loss) and melanoderma, with hyperpigmentation of the skin at friction points and of the mucous membranes. Only the latter sign was specific to the disease, and Zachary Cope underlined the fact that melanoderma is not always uniform, and that "in some cases the dark patches of the skin were mingled with areas showing a lack of pigment – a true black and white appearance". Skin coloration was of particular importance, as it was the only clinical feature distinguishing Addison's disease of the adrenals from another "Addison's disease" (described by the same author six years earlier, in 1849), which corresponded to a hematological condition better known today as pernicious anemia. (Note: A more complete description of pernicious anemia was published in 1872, 23 years after Addison, by the German physician Anton Biermer.) Cope concluded: "There is no disease other than Addison's disease that could present a face that was "black and white" and at the same time give rise to the other symptoms described in her letters." Cope believed that the presence of fever was due to the rapid progression of the disease, and pointed out that "back pain was noted in Addison's disease by several observers".

However, important associated signs that do not belong to the classic picture of Addison's disease remain poorly explained, as Claire Tomalin, with the medical endorsement of Dr. Eric Beck, Fellow of the UK Royal College of Physicians, (Note: Claire Tomalin addresses Jane Austen's final illness on pages 254–255 and 258–269 (death) of Jane Austen: A Life. She discussed the nature of the illness in Appendix I, "Note on Jane Austen's Final Illness". She indicated that "a healthy, bronzed appearance" and "postural hypotension" (i.e. weakness on rising) would be symptoms of Addison's disease, but neither was noted in Jane Austen's case. She observed that Austen's recurrent fevers were not characteristic of Addison's disease. She also noted that "in the case of Addison's disease, one should have expected a steady progression of the condition, whereas Jane Austen's disease oscillated between periods of improvement and deterioration", which contradicted Cope's assertion that Addison's disease was "subject to remissions during which the patient felt much better and hoped for recovery". Back pain remained unaddressed. C. Tomalin suggested that "it was possible that she had suffered from a lymphoma such as Hodgkin's disease [...] which would produce recurrent fevers and progressive weakening, leading to death". She also suggested that the severe facial pains the novelist had suffered for seven weeks in 1813 (a fact both Jane Austen and Fanny Knight had reported) could have been the first symptoms of lymphoma, and analyzed the possibility that these pains were the result of shingles, noting that "it would seem unlikely that such a painful condition could have gone unmentioned".) was quick to point out.

The main Jane Austen biographers to support Cope's hypothesis are Jan Fergus (Note: Jane Austen's illness was mentioned by Fergus on pages 166 and 169–170 of his book: "The symptoms of Addison's disease, which probably caused her death, began to appear early in 1816", he wrote on page 163. Jan Fergus only quoted Cope's article.) and Deirdre Le Faye. Australian English literature professor John Wiltshire has also advocated Addison's Disease.

=== Hodgkin lymphoma ===
Hodgkin lymphoma was described by the English pathologist Thomas Hodgkin in 1832.

The possibility of Hodgkin lymphoma in Jane Austen was first raised by F.A. Bevan, in response to Sir Zachary Cope's article proposing Addison's disease. Bevan referred anecdotally to a case in which Hodgkin lymphoma, then called "lymphadenoma", had had as its initial manifestation a "pain in the back" without any superficial lymphadenopathies being noted during the course. (Note: In a short three-page article, David Waldron Smithers discusses medicine as it appears in Jane Austen's novels, as well as the disease that took her, pages 305–306: "The well-known surgeon Sir Zachary Cope identified her with Addison's disease, a failure of the adrenal glands, drawing a probable conclusion from very flimsy evidence. Dr. Bevan replied in a letter suggesting that she might have Hodgkin's disease, as the increasing fatigue, fever attacks, and remissions during a continuous weakening in a few months might fairly fit his hypothesis, although the increased size of the lymph nodes was not reported" (p. 305). Smithers noted that Cope was absolutely certain that Jane Austen's description of the discoloration of her skin corresponded to the golden-brown pigmentation caused by Addison's disease.)

The hypothesis that Jane Austen died of Hodgkin's disease was taken up and defended 41 years after Bevan by an Australian academic, Annette Upfal, with the medical support of her compatriot, immunologist Ian Frazer. In her argument, she cites a possible history of infectious mononucleosis (at the time called "Glandular fever"), which could have been contracted following kisses (Note: Mono owes its common nickname of "kissing disease" to its salivary mode of transmission.) from suitors. Mononucleosis is known to be sometimes associated with the later development of Hodgkin's disease. Certain of Jane's symptoms could be interpreted as consistent with Hodgkin lymphoma, such as the onset of facial neuralgia in 1813, presumably following shingles, (Note: Herpes zoster virus infections are rare in young people, and may reveal pre-existing immunity deficiencies, possibly related to lymphoma.) and the episode of intense pruritus (Note: Pruritus without rash is a symptom observed in 85% of patients with Hodgkin's disease, at some stage in their course.) at the beginning of 1815. Most consistent with a diagnosis of Hodgkin lymphoma is the cyclic fever characteristic of the terminal period of Jane Austen's illness, being attributed to Pel-Ebstein fever, a classic symptom of the advanced stages of Hodgkin lymphoma. However, Upfal was forced to appeal to a rare complication of Hodgkin's disease, thrombocytopenic purpura, to explain such dramatic changes in Jane Austen's skin coloration.

=== Brill-Zinsser disease ===
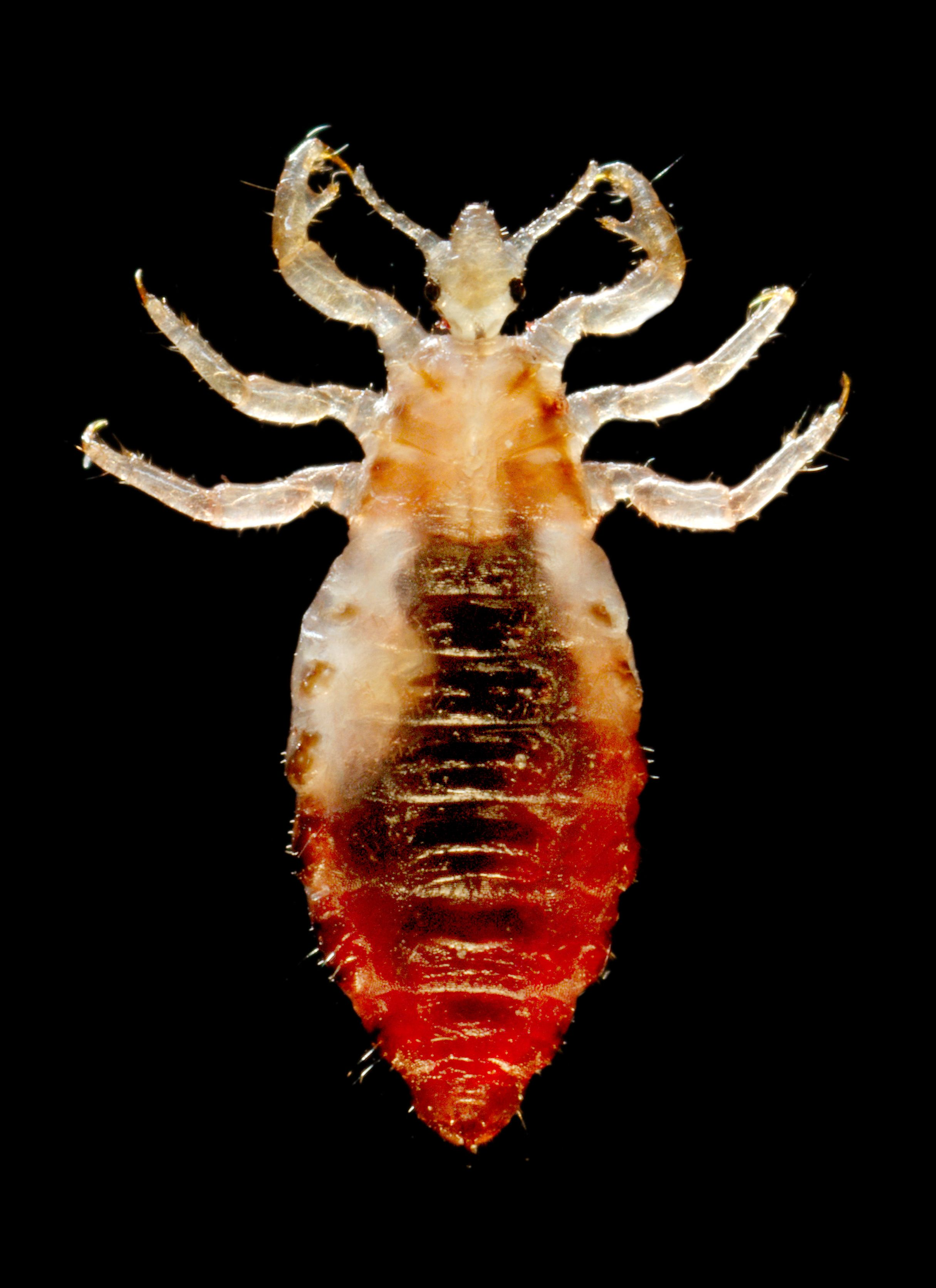
Pediculus humanus corporis, the body louse, agent of pediculosis and vector of typhus.

Brill-Zinsser disease, a recurrent form of typhus, was described in the 20th century by two Americans, first clinically in 1910 by physician Nathan Brill (1860–1925), then formally linked to its cause in 1934 by bacteriologist Hans Zinsser (1878–1940). Brill-Zinsser disease is usually mild, resembling an attenuated form of epidemic typhus, with circulatory, hepatic, renal and central neurological disorders. The fever episode lasts 7 to 10 days. The rash is very mild, if not completely absent. There are, however, severe forms of Brill-Zinsser disease that can lead to death, and which, according to Linda Robinson Walker, are included in the differential diagnosis of the causes of Jane Austen's death. Arguments in favor of this hypothesis include a history of severe typhus in childhood, digestive disorders ("bile"), skin signs (discoloration) and recurrent febrile attacks interspersed with free intervals. According to L. Robinson Walker, this hypothesis was dismissed by Jane Austen's doctors because, at the time, resurgent forms of typhus were unknown and it was thought that typhus, like typhoid, conferred a definitive immunity on the patient who survived it (an opinion later defended by Charles Nicolle in 1928 in his Nobel Prize acceptance speech).

=== Tuberculosis ===
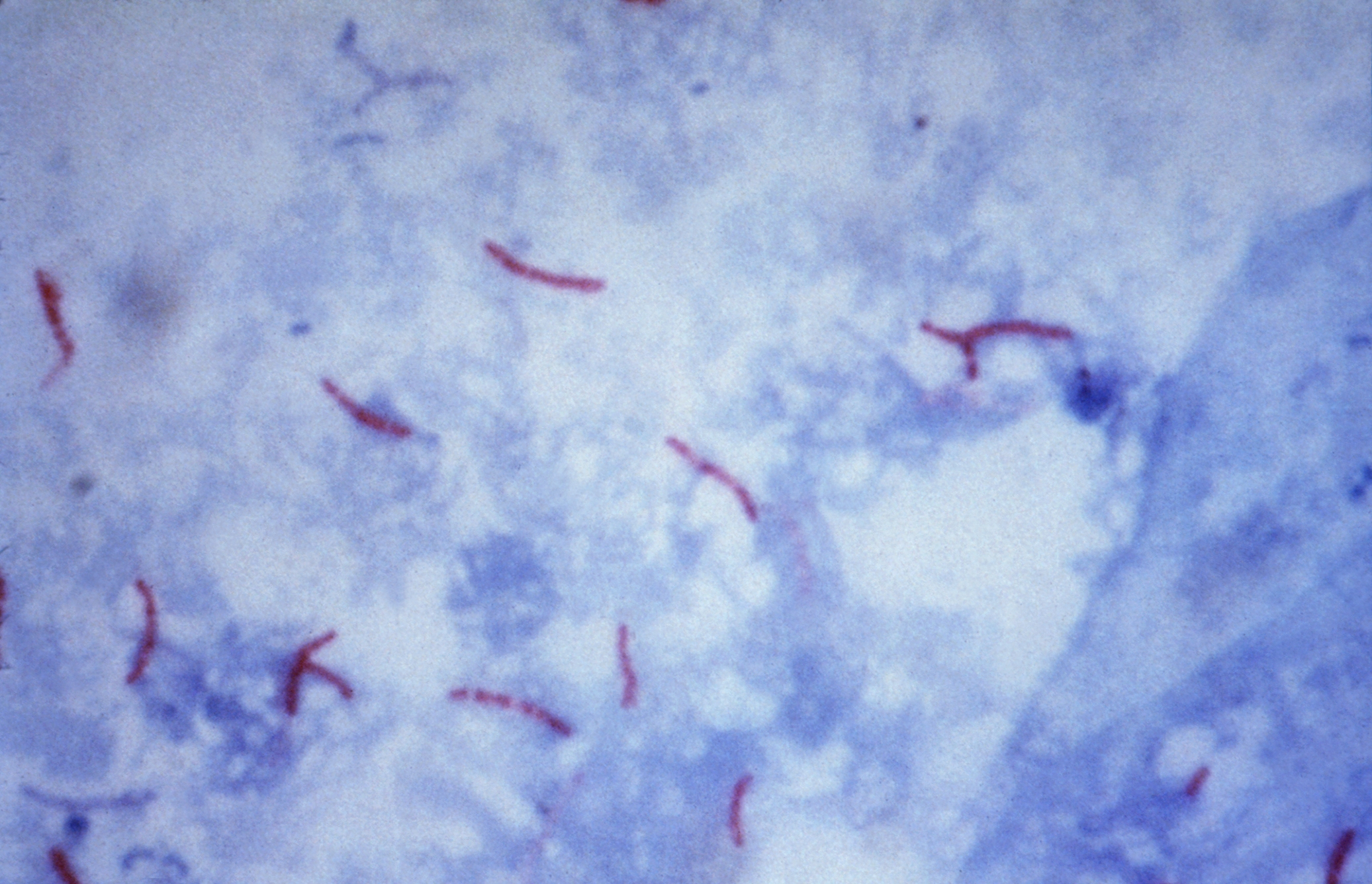
Koch's bacillus, the causative agent of tuberculosis, stained with the Ziehl-Neelsen stain.

Tuberculosis can affect the adrenals, causing Addison's disease. It commonly causes attacks of intermittent fever, and it can also affect the digestive organs, giving rise to "tabes mesenterica", a hypothesis briefly considered (but ultimately dismissed) by Cope to explain "gastrointestinal attacks". Annette Upfal pointed out that the autopsy demonstrated the association of tuberculosis with Hodgkin's disease in 20% of cases. A diagnosis of tuberculosis in Jane Austen (of which Addison's disease of the adrenals would have been one of the consequences) therefore in no way precludes the coexistence of Hodgkin's disease, and would reconcile Cope's and Upfal's respective points of view. Park Honan's analysis in Jane Austen: A Life (1987) supports this view. (Note: Jane Austen's final illness was mentioned or discussed by P. Honan on pages 374, 378, 379, 385–392, 394–398, 400–405 (death). Park Honan discussed the nature of her illness on pages 391–392. He noted symptoms compatible with Addison's disease, and pointed out that adrenal destruction could result from tuberculosis, stomach or intestinal cancer, or an autoimmune reaction. Honan quoted Cope's article, but was not dogmatic: he pointed out that Cope had called his own work a "hypothesis", and cited the – apparently unpublished – work of Dr. P. N. Cowen, who argued that, if we overlook Jane Austen's change in skin color, the other symptoms were consistent with a diagnosis of cancer or tuberculosis as such without having to consider the adrenals.)

=== Other hypotheses ===
In addition to digestive tuberculosis, Cope's work considered various diagnostic hypotheses:

- pernicious anemia (Addison's) to explain the pallor and asthenia;
- stomach cancer, to explain the digestive disorders, deteriorating general condition and weight loss;
- myasthenia to explain the fluctuating fatigue and weakness (but he noted that there were no records of any difficulty in speaking, chewing or swallowing).

These various hypotheses were refuted in the discussion as failing to explain the changes in skin coloration. Cope cited Jane Austen's letter of March 23, 1817 to Fanny Knight, in which she reported some improvement in her condition: as she put it, "I have recovered some of my appearance, which has been rather ugly, black and white and all colors askew".

== Bibliography ==
- Austen, Jane (1817). "Lettre du dimanche 23 mars 1817 à Fanny Knight". The Republic of Pemberley.
- B. C. Southam (1987). ed. Jane Austen: The Critical Heritage, 1870–1940. Vol. 2. Londres: Routledge and Paul Kegan. ISBN 0-7102-0189-3.
- Cecil, David (2009). Un portrait de Jane Austen (in French). Paris: Payot. ISBN 978-2-228-90378-3.
- Shields, Carol (2002). Jane Austen (in French). Canada: Les Editions Fides. ISBN 978-2-7621-2372-2.
- Tomalin, Claire (2000). Jane Austen, passions discrètes. Littératures (in French). Translated by Christiane Bernard et Jacqueline Gouirand-Rousselon. Paris: Autrement. ISBN 2-7467-0011-5.
- Collins, Irene (1994). Jane Austen and the Clergy. Londres: The Hambledon Press. ISBN 1-85285-114-7.
- Le Faye, Deirdre (1995). Ed. Jane Austen's Letters. Oxford: Oxford University Press. ISBN 0-19-283297-2.
- Le Faye, Deirdre (2003). Jane Austen: A Family Record. Second Edition. Cambridge: Cambridge University Press. ISBN 0-521-53417-8.
- Fergus, Jan (1991). Jane Austen: A Literary Life. Londres: Macmillan. ISBN 0-333-44701-8.
- Tomalin, Claire (1997). Jane Austen: A Life. New York: Alfred A. Knopf. ISBN 0-679-44628-1.
- Honan, Park (1987). Jane Austen: A Life. New York: St. Martin's Press. ISBN 0-312-01451-1.
- Poplawski, Paul (1998). A Jane Austen encyclopedia. Greenwood Publishing Group. ISBN 978-0-313-30017-2.
- Nokes, David (1998). Jane Austen: a life. University of California Press. ISBN 978-0-520-21606-8.
