= Sir James Wylie, 1st Baronet =

Scottish imperial physician and reformer in Russia

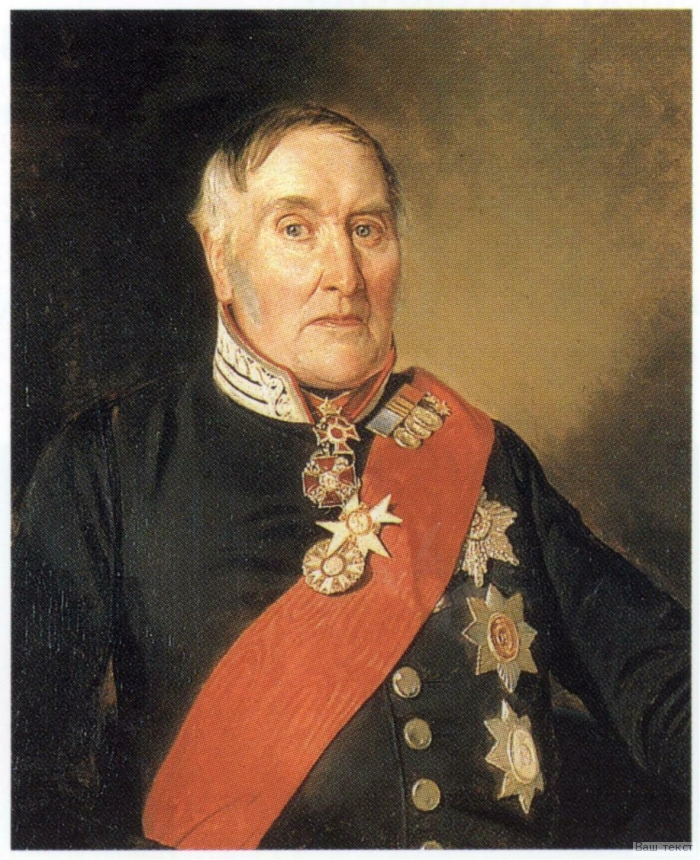
- 1841 portrait
- Born: James Wylie; 13 November 1768; Kincardine-on-Forth, Scotland
- Died: 11 February 1854 OS, aged 85; Saint Petersburg
- Education: University of Edinburgh
- Known for: Russian battlefield surgery. Russian military medical training. Creation of national corps of Russian-born military doctors. Physician to three tsars.
- Awards: List

Sir James Wylie, 1st Baronet (13 November 1768 – 11 February 1854 OS) was a Scottish physician widely known today within Russia as Яков Васильевич Виллие (Yakov Vasil'evich Villie). From 1790 to 1829, he served in the Imperial Russian army as a battlefield surgeon in more than 50 battles, concurrently directing all battlefield medicine in the final 40. He held that role from 1806 until 1854; also from 1798 until 1854 the physician to three tsars; and from 1808 to 1838 the president of Saint Petersburg's Imperial Medical and Surgical Academy. His name is inseparably connected with the creation of both battlefield medicine and a national corps of Russian-born military doctors within the Imperial Russian army during the first half of the 19th century, plus transformation of its military medical training.

== Early life: 1768–1790 ==
Wylie was born on 13 November 1768 at Kincardine-on-Forth, a major Scottish seaport, one of eight children, he and four brothers surviving infancy. His parents were Janet (née Meiklejohn) and William Wylie, a carrier, Forth cargo transporter and farmer.

He excelled at school. His ambition in medicine, he was apprenticed to the local doctor. Completing this, he gained admittance to the University of Edinburgh. He completed three years there from 1786, during a gilded era for the university's medical school, it arguably providing Europe's best medical instruction. He was likely taught by professors Joseph Black, William Cullen, James Gregory, Francis Home, Alexander Munro, and Daniel Rutherford, all acclaimed within their fields.

Attracted to surgery, he undertook personal lessons.

He left the university without graduating, probably through poverty. He stated in 1823 that "in youth he was so very poor, as to be unable to pay for all the classes at college, and, therefore, was frequently obliged to bribe the doorkeepers", and added that a passer-by had once paid his fee and "he regrets most exceedingly, that in spite of every inquiry, he has never been able to evince his gratitude".

== Battlefield surgeon: 1790–1795 ==
At the suggestion of John Rogerson, physician to Empress Catherine II, he moved to Russia in September 1790, passed the Medical Collegium's examination for the right to practise medicine, and became physician to Prince Galitzin.

Finding his surname impossible to pronounce, Russians named him Villie.

In December 1790 he was appointed Surgeon-in-Ordinary within the 33rd Eletsky regiment, stationed in Lithuania, serving at the 1792 Polish-Russian War and 1794 Kościuszko Uprising.

He battled "intermittent fever" (malaria) among the troops, being commended after formulating an effective pharmaceutical. He became known for surgical skill, extracting an unusually-large bladder stone, and performing a particularly rare extraction of a musket ball embedded in a lumbar vertebra, and subsequently promoted.

In December 1794, he received a Doctor of Medicine degree from King's College, Aberdeen, this commonly awarded there in recognition of general and professional attainments.

After five years in the army, he resigned when appointed physician to Count Stroganov, meanwhile undertaking private practice, initially at Moscow, then at Saint Petersburg.

== Doctor to Tsar Paul I: 1798–1801 ==
Empress Catherine II died in November 1796, her son crowned Tsar Paul I. Surgical skill, boldness, and good fortune landed Wylie within the tsar's Court.

He had reacquainted himself with Rogerson, a physician within the new Court. Rogerson later contacted him when in difficulty using a catheter to remove a urinary bladder stone for the tsar's friend, the Danish ambassador. Wylie successfully performed the life-saving lithotomy using a trocar improvised from the catheter, afterwards appointed a Court surgeon (February 1798).

He was soon tackling complex surgeries. Brought in by faltering superiors, he unhesitatingly performed a procedure unheard of in Russia (tracheotomy) on a man about to asphyxiate. This was Pavel Kutaisov, the tsar's closest confidant. Upgraded to the tsar's Surgeon-in-Ordinary (June 1799), Wylie was provided rooms within the palace and appointed physician to the tsesarevic. He accompanied the tsar on his journeys.

In 1800, the Medical Collegium awarded him Doctor of Medicine and Surgery based on his 1794 qualification from Aberdeen University.

In March 1801, Tsar Paul was assassinated. Wylie participated in the autopsy. Asked to prepare the death certificate, he certified the cause of death as apoplexy, and embalmed the tsar's distorted facial features to be presentable for public viewing, thereafter never mentioning the marks of violence.

== Doctor to Tsar Alexander I: 1801–1825 ==
Tsar Paul's son was crowned Alexander I. Wylie retained his position, and at Maria Feodorovna's insistence travelled everywhere with him.

He became a favourite of the tsar, being granted, in 1804, lifetime feudal ownership of a village and its serfs. Named Vileiskoye after his Russian name, it was the first of four or more grants. For at least one of these, he is known to have arranged annual bank deposits of five roubles per serf: army recruits among them receiving their full share upon demobilisation, others receiving their full share as needed. Two grants near Saint Petersburg were still in place when he died, his will releasing those serfs from villeinage.

=== Russia at war: October 1805 – March 1814 ===
==== Wars of the Third and Fourth Coalitions: October 1805 – June 1807 ====
Wylie began guiding Medical-Surgical Academy students in surgery on cadavers and live patients, and almost daily was teaching doctors and participating in patient care at a military hospital. He also proved a proficient administrator; and after concerns about Napoleon re-emerged in 1805, the tsar appointed him Medical Inspector of the Imperial Guard. This established a pattern of him teaching military medicine and personally directing it on the battlefield; meanwhile serving as tsar's doctor.

In 1805, Russia, Austria and Britain formed a coalition against French encroachment into Europe, this collapsing upon Austria signing a peace treaty with France after comprehensive defeat of the Russian/Austrian forces at Austerlitz.

Wylie came close to death at Austerlitz, a cannon ball landing two steps away, and his horse shot. That year, he nicked his finger while operating on a gangrenous wound; ensuing infection necessitating amputation. His other army service wounds were a dagger plunged mid-thigh and a musket-ball into the shoulder.

Appointed Chief Military Medical Inspector (January 1806), Wylie directed Russia's medical team and attended the wounded at battles of another coalition that formed within months (Russia, Prussia and others).

This coalition ended after overwhelming Russian defeat at Friedland.

==== Russia's treaty with Napoleon, and preparation for invasion: June 1807 – June 1812 ====
The tsar and Napoleon met shortly afterwards at Tilsit to sign peace terms; meeting again the following year at Erfurt. There, Napoleon thanked the tsar for Russian doctors' attentions to French wounded.

In 1808, Wylie became responsible for Russian military medicine training when appointed President of Saint Petersburg's Imperial Medical and Surgical Academy, and was also appointed manager of all army medicine, Land Forces Ministry (recast in January 1812 as director, Army Medical Department, War Ministry), meanwhile still serving as tsar's physician.

That year, he directed medical staff in the Finnish War.

Détente with Napoleon unravelled by 1810, Russian spies in Paris afterwards uncovering Napoleon's 1812 invasion plan. The War Ministry commenced massive increases in military capability.

Wylie did likewise for army medical capability, his task quantified to assembling medical services for an army of 300,000 having at least 500 doctors. He included Academy pupils graduated ahead of schedule, civilian doctors, and army doctors spared from elsewhere; achieving high sufficiency in field surgeons, ancillary staff, medications, etcetera.

==== War of 1812–1814 ====
On 12 June OS, Napoleon's advance troops crossed the Neman River into Russian Lithuania, the first of 651,000. Wylie directed the army's medical services at all major battles during its eastward withdrawal to Moscow and subsequent pursuit of Napoleon's force westward, viz: Vitebsk, Smolensk, Borodino, Tarutino, Maloyaroslavets, Vyazma, and Krasnoi.

The Battle of Borodino took place on 26 August 1812 OS. With Moscow at stake, this was the deadliest single-day battle of the Napoleonic Wars and one of the bloodiest single-day battles in history until the 1914 First Battle of the Marne.

More than a quarter of a million took part. Accompanying the battle were unceasing discharges from 1,211 artillery pieces. About 45,000–50,000 Russian soldiers were killed or wounded. Wounds were particularly numerous from round shot, explosive shell and canister: all generally life changing. Wylie later reported: "In addition to examining many wounded, I performed between 60 and 80 important operations".

Exhausted opposing forces came to a standstill towards nightfall. Wylie later rode in darkness with General Platov and his Cossack skirmishers on a wide-ranging foray through the French lines.

The Russian force withdrew the following day, its wounded evacuated to hospitals at Moscow and beyond.

Pausing outside Moscow, field marshal Kutuzov and his senior generals resolved that their army was insufficient to stand between Napoleon's force and Moscow; the city abandoned without a fight.

Moscow's bridges became chocked with the retreating army and fleeing residents, jeopardising the transfer beyond harm's way of 30,000 wounded hospitalised there from Borodino and earlier battles, but Wylie managed this for all but 6,000.

Napoleon arrived there on 3 September OS; mistakenly expecting to find supplies and winter quarters. He found Moscow deserted; and overnight fires destroyed most of the city, but nevertheless waited there 5 weeks for the tsar's agreement to peace proposals.

Napoleon's retreat was manoeuvred by Kutuzov back onto the Russian's scorched-earth retreat to Moscow. Suffering starvation and lack of shelter, the retreat became a rout; survivors ejected from Russian territory during December.

Knowing that Europe's chance to be rid of Napoleon would slip away unless Russia's army pursued him, Tsar Alexander assembled a coalition with Prussia, Austria and others.

Major battles occurred during 1813 at Lützen, Bautzen, Dresden, Kulm, Leipzig, and Hanau in Germany; then in France during early 1814 at Brienne, Bar-sur-Aube, Arcis-sur-Aube, Fere-Champenoise and Paris. Wylie directed Russia's medical services at all.

A battle of colossal scale, the bloodiest of the Napoleonic wars, occurred at Leipzig in October 1813, 400,000 rounds of artillery ammunition being expended, and 150,000 casualties. Napoleon's force suffered mortal defeat. Wylie described taking charge of 40,000 wounded soldiers, including abandoned French. To accommodate them, 56 Leipzig buildings became makeshift hospitals.

=== At Paris and London: March–July 1814 ===
Paris capitulated on 31 March 1814.

There, tsar Alexander was warmly thanked by allied sovereigns for Wylie treating their wounded, and the reinstated Louis XVIII awarded Wylie the Legion of honour for his doctors treating wounded Frenchmen.

1816 Mezzotint from 1815 portrait

The tsar visited England. In June; Wylie was knighted at Ascot races by the Prince Regent at the tsar's request. Nobody at the impromptu ceremony had a sword needed for the accolade except General Platov who offered his scimitar. Platov presented this to Wylie, it now displayed within the Kremlin Armoury.

Afterwards visiting a warship, the tsar mentioned to the regent that he had made his own physician a baronet; whereupon the regent replied: "Well, I will make yours one"; telling Wylie to consider himself a baronet as a patent would be ordered. The tsar, who was designing a coat of arms for Wylie, sought permission to include supporters. Although baronets are not entitled to this, his request was granted, Wylie receiving the patent with specific permission for supporters on his coat of arms.

The coat of arms is indicative of the bearer's attachment to Russia, particularly its Cossacks. Above the shield is a galloping Cossack and the eagle from Imperial Russia's coat of arms. The shield bears the optional baronet's red left hand, the noble's open-faced helmet, the fox typically included on Wylie coats of arms, and Wylie's motto: Labore et Scientia.

Wylie had remained a British subject; barring him from receiving Russian nobility. Nevertheless, in 1816 the tsar directed that a Diploma of Nobility of the Russian Empire be confirmed, with Wylie's British coat of arms annexed, the baronetcy receiving State Council recognition in 1824 (Russia's sole baronet), and the Diploma of Nobility approved in 1847.

=== Final years attending the tsar: 1814–1825 ===
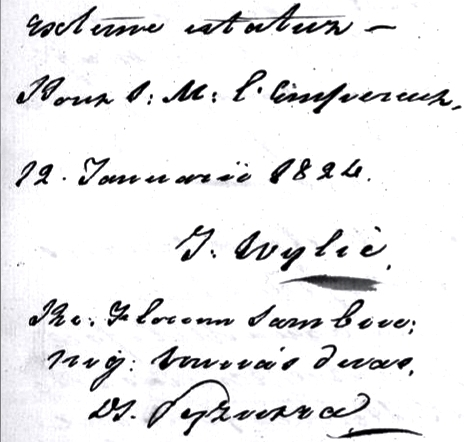
Wylie's signature: prescription for Alexander I.

The following nine years occupied Wylie in accompanying the tsar to incessant meetings with alliance partners about restoring European stability.

Wylie's bond with the tsar was manifest when badly injured in an 1823 carriage rollover. He was afterwards visited by a nephew who later recounted Wylie's comments about the tsar's response to the accident: "The attentions of H.I.M. to Sir James upon this occasion were ...really those of a brother to a brother".

It was the same in June 1824 when chosen by the tsar's chief of staff to advise him about the death of his last surviving daughter.

That year, Wylie's clinical judgement and resolve were tested when erysipelas in the tsar's leg, injured in his own carriage rollover in 1818, began spreading; gangrene apparent. Threatened by an anxious mob outside the palace (even given passports for their escape), the tsar's entourage except Wylie urged immediate amputation, he healing the tsar.

In late 1825, Wylie was within the tsar's unusually-small entourage during an informal stay at remote Taganrog when the tsar died from 'fever'. Over time, evidence emerged to suggest Wylie's participation in a ruse; enabling the tsar to escape his autocrat's burdens; becoming priestly hermit Fyodor Kuzmich.

== Doctor to Tsar Nicholas I: 1826–1854 ==
Tsar Alexander's brother was crowned Nicholas I. Wylie retained his positions; forging a close bond with Nicholas; this likely deepened by having healed the Empress's mother in 1808.

In the 1828–1829 Russo-Turkish War he directed medical teams at sieges of Silistra, Shumen and Varna, performed any challenging surgeries, and combated devastating typhus and cholera outbreaks. His doctors treated wounded Turks.

A cholera pandemic passed through Russia between 1829 and 1832. Poorly understood, needless deaths resulted. When it reached Saint Petersburg, Wylie conducted 19 clinical trials of cures and palliatives, across 1,639 cholera patients at its military hospitals. He also routinely assembled Guards doctors for visits to the primary cholera hospital; closely examining each patient, drawing the doctors' attention to manifestations of the disease, and requiring each to likewise endanger himself. In 1832, he inspected military hospitals in Russian Poland; providing advice and suggesting improvements.

Wylie's busy schedule prevented him from regularly attending the Academy, but he remained aware of matters there; intervening whenever necessary. However, in 1838, he overlooked major trouble there. Considering himself ultimately responsible, he resigned.

== Achievements ==
=== Leadership of the creation of Russian battlefield medicine ===
Early 19th century Russia had little organised medical profession, its upper echelon hiring foreign doctors. Battlefield medicine was likewise meagre, the entire army having just 200 doctors, mostly foreigners; some underqualified, too old, or poor Russian speakers.

Upon joining the army, Wylie found that battalions generally had a sole foreign doctor without auxiliaries. Absence of regulations meant that officers inevitably became doctors' priority, often removed far from the battlefield and treated there for as long as doctors wished. Lower ranks rarely received treatment; succumbing more readily to wounds and diseases. Ambulance services and first-aid posts non-existent; the wounded were abandoned on the battlefield. Wylie resolved to one day mandate treatment of all ranks.

==== Creation of a phased treatment/evacuation system ====
Wylie's appointments as Chief Military Medical Inspector (1806) and manager of all army medicine (1808) saw him transform battlefield medicine, bringing to these roles considerable battlefield experience; a "real genius for administration", and according to colleagues, a practical and scientific approach.

His team created the prototype for the latter-day "drainage" system of staged treatment of the wounded.

Battlefield dressing stations deployed, viz:

- Irrespective of rank, wounded soldiers were carried to battlefield dressing stations deployed adjacent to the fighting troops, for triage and initial attention by regimental medics.
- Then, if required, the wounded were forwarded for treatment/evacuation to regimental infirmaries, then along an echelon of progressively-larger hospitals.
- Each regiment had 20 non-combatants undertaking transfers from its dressing station to its regimental infirmary:
- Dressing stations were provided with surgical instruments, ready-made dressings, and pharmaceutical box; all delivered via a regimental cart.
- Station locations, denoted via posted flags, were established prior to battle by military police tasked with delivering the wounded from the battlefield.

Mobile Hospitals deployed:

Moving with the army, these were regimental infirmaries plus a hospital at each divisional and corps headquarters. Regulations formally described providing armies on the move with transport, staffing, and materiel for these hospitals, and set hospital capacities and treatment standards. Also:

- Prior to anticipated battle, each mobile hospital received reserve medical supplies.
- Military police convoys transferred the wounded between mobile hospitals, and to hospitals further afield.
- Each doctor had an instrument and pharmaceutical box matching his hospital type.
- Army surgical instruments being inadequate, around 1806 Wylie established supply standards; embedding these within army supply tables and hospital standards. At his own expense, he purchased British instruments as templates for local production overseen by him; providing Russian doctors with most known types.

Temporary Hospitals deployed:

In 1807, Wylie had established and equipped military hospitals at Königsberg serving 20,000 wounded Russian and French soldiers gathered there following the nearby Battle of Eylau. These spawned his later "Temporary Military Hospital": a large-capacity hospital located at a safe distance from the mobile hospitals; acting as an intermediary between them and city hospitals (military and civilian) further afield. Regulations formally outlined the role of temporary hospitals within the phased treatment/evacuation system, their materiel supply, and nutritional arrangements. Invasion imminent, Wylie increased readied temporary hospitals from 29 to 70.

Ancillary measures at city military hospitals:

- To ensure high hospital standards, Wylie conducted frequent inspections, insisting on hospital cleanliness.
- Before admission, patients were bathed, and clothing sent for fumigation.
- Hospital protocols impeding spread of contagious diseases included restricted wards, and captured physicians put to use treating captured compatriot patients.
- In 1808, Wylie mandated that the hospital doctors maintain case records, and hospitals and army divisions maintain annual mortality/morbidity statistics, also requiring his War Department team to overhaul its medical data.
- Russian military hospitals were in "a deplorable state" when Wylie arrived in Russia. He guided their reconstruction in line with institutions visited with tsar Alexander at Paris and London in 1814. In 1827, a prominent British doctor declared Saint Petersburg's numerous military hospitals in "very excellent condition".

For military doctors across all hospital types, Wylie put all aspects of their service onto an equal footing with combat officer counterparts, ensuring undisputed authority over army medicine within their purview.

==== System effectiveness ====
Russian military medicine would become impressive by 1814, but Wylie's phased treatment/evacuation system was still a fledgling in 1812. Nevertheless, at Borodino his doctors would work within an organised and coherent framework, evacuating and treating 16,000 wounded, including 567 amputations, within the first 26 hours.

Then, requisitioning buildings along the army's 1,500 mile advance between Moscow and the French border during 1812–1813; Wylie created a string of fully-equipped temporary hospitals. From these, via huge feats of organisation, two-thirds of wounded soldiers were returned to their depleted regiments during the army's 1812–1813 winter pause at the Neman, and many more during its 1813–1814 winter pause at the French border.

=== Enhancement of Russian military medical training ===
The Medical-Surgical Academy was Tsar Paul's amalgamation of existing training centres; intended as Russia's principal institution for high-capacity training of military physicians, being renamed Imperial Medical and Surgical Academy (1808), Imperial Military Medical Academy (1881), and S.M. Kirov Military Medical Academy (1935).

Initially, the Academy "resembled a noble aristocrat in rags"; lacking instructional literature and statutes defining its functions, its classrooms poorly equipped. When teaching there, Wylie had observed ineffective teaching regimes. Teaching was often based on translations of outdated foreign manuals or instructors' personal notes. Translation had never been done for many manuals; some instructors simply reading out the Latin or German text.

==== Imperial Medical and Surgical Academy restructure ====
Johann Frank, was recruited in 1805 as Academy rector, and his draft regulations were approved in 1806.

Concerned, Wylie set down some remarks on Franks' regulations, suggested a high-level review of them, and drafted a counter-proposal. Ignoring the review, the tsar approved Wylie's counter-proposal and declared Frank's invalid. After refinement, Wylie's regulations were adopted in July 1808; he appointed inaugural President of the Academy and its Moscow annex.

Frank's plan envisaged the Academy becoming a high-profile university. In an era of continuous warfare, Wylie's proposal better suited supplying Russia's armed forces with ample medical personnel, particularly high quality surgeons. His initiatives nevertheless transformed the Academy into Russia's foremost educational medical education institution, equal to Europe's best.

With far-reaching powers; and initially reporting directly to the tsar; Wylie vigorously developed the Academy; its arrangements mirroring Edinburgh medical school. It developed a singularly-military character, imbuing students with zeal for soldier welfare.

New regulatory framework:

- Democratic management via a professors' "Conference" chaired by the president.
- Curriculum:
  - Students instructed over four years.
  - Rigorous examination arrangements.
  - Separate fields of study for Human Medicine, Veterinary Medicine, Pharmacy, and (1818) Ophthalmology.
  - Practical skills considered essential; Surgery, Ocular, and Therapeutic Measures clinics were established.
  - Epidemiology and Medical Geography added to curriculum; this underpinned by the Academy routinely assembling pathogen data for individual geographic and ethnographic regions.
- Instructors:
  - Professorship applicants performed a trial lecture, and submitted for approval textbooks on which intending to base lectures. Adjunct instructors were subjected to written and oral examinations and trial lecture.
  - Wylie personally selected Academy instructors and departmental heads.
  - He contributed greatly to attracting medical specialists as instructors.
  - Over time, instructors were increased to 24 professors and 24 adjuncts.
- Academy empowered to bestow:
  - "Physician" degree.
  - "Physician-Surgeon" degree, reflecting Wylie's imperative for surgical training, awarded upon conduct of three demanding surgeries during graduation year.
  - "Right to Practise" diploma (required by every medical degree holder seeking employment within Russia).
- Students:
  - Most were salaried and provided with free on-site accommodation and meals, and accordingly indentured after graduation, but self-funded, unindentured, students were welcomed.
  - Over time, salaried student places were increased from 120 to 720.
  - Serf graduates were freed from villeinage after six years' military service.
  - Awards to top graduates included:
    - freedom to choose their workplaces, including privileged Guards units.
    - scholarships to further their studies abroad, via a 100,000 rouble donation from Wylie, the bank interest going to students who were sons of impoverished military doctors (1841).
    - one 2-year travelling fellowship, using funds from Wylie's will, awarded annually until 1914.
- Instructional adjuncts:
  - Europe's largest medical library assembled.
  - Anatomy museum, specialised pharmacy, and botanic garden established.

==== Establishment of academy journal ====
To maintain Academy graduates' awareness of advances in medical knowledge, in 1811 Wylie launched and edited its journal; General Journal of Medical Sciences. Upgraded in 1823 as Military Medical Journal, it became one of Russia's most significant scientific journals and the oldest peer reviewed one.

=== Creation of a national corps of Russian military doctors ===
Wylie had long understood the imperative for fully indigenous medicine in Russia, proactively fostering it.

He favoured Russians when selecting Academy instructors and departmental heads. Rejecting Frank's proposed instruction in Latin and German; he mandated instruction in Russian, where possible via teaching resources written in Russian, and in 1822 directed translation of all foreign manuals or creation of Russian-language manuals where suitable foreign ones non-existent.

When addressing army doctor shortages and inadequacies. He fostered development, promotion, and awards for Russians; guiding one to become the first Russian royal physician.

Writing to War Minister Chernyshyov in 1841 about his vision for this Russian doctor corps, Wylie stated his intention to donate 100,000 roubles towards its attainment.

Upon routinely obtaining sufficient highly-qualified Russian graduates, he abandoned army recruitment of foreign doctors.

== Published works ==
Books

1. Concerning American Yellow Fever (1805).
2. Brief Manual about the Most Important Surgical Operations (1806), the first Russian-language military surgery manual.
3. Manual for Physicians Performing Recruit Selection (1806, 1810, 1812).
4. Manual to Guide Designating Lower Ranks Leaving Hospital as Unfit (1808).
5. Pharmacopoeia Castrensis Ruthena (1808, 1812, 1818, 1840).
6. Practical Recommendations Concerning Diseases (1828).
7. Practical Recommendations Concerning Plague (2nd ed. 1828).
8. Infectious Diseases from the Viewpoints of Medicine and Police (1829).
9. Practical Observations on Diseases Related to Tropical Climates (1829), his translation of an Englishman's work.
10. Practical Observations about Intermittent Fevers and Remittent Fevers (1829).
11. Description of Indian Cholera for Army Doctors (1830).
12. Report about Therapeutic Methods Used Against Cholera in the St. Petersburg Military Hospitals, with Practical Observations about the Nature of this Disease (1831).
13. Description of Ophthalmia Afflicting Troops (1835).

Essays

1. On the use of arsenic in curing intermittent fevers (1794).
2. Method for healing scabies (1811).
3. About scurvy.
4. Practical recommendations concerning plague (1st ed. 1827).
5. Methods of water purification (1827).
6. Methods for preserving soldiers’ health in wartime (1828).
7. Description of the symptoms of epidemic cholera, and demarcation of its different types (1831).

== Awards and honours ==
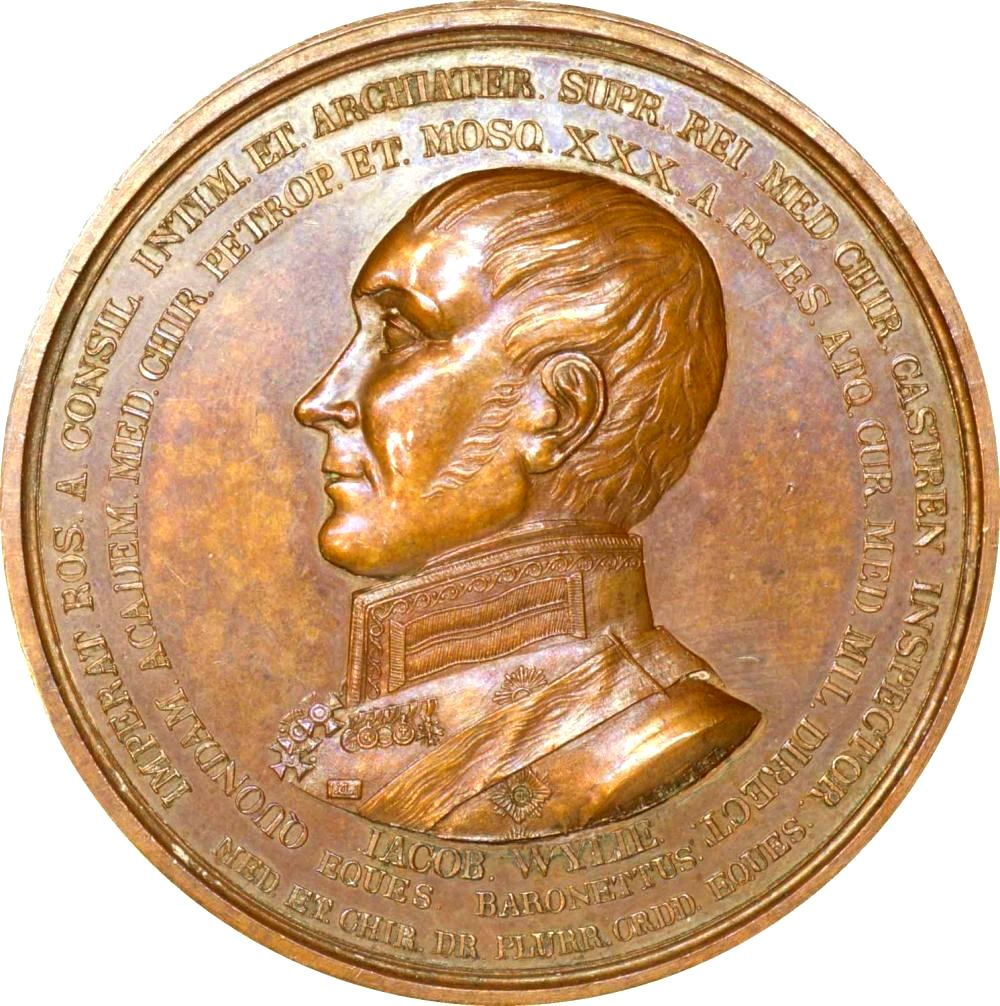
Medal: 50 years' service to Russian medicine, 1840.

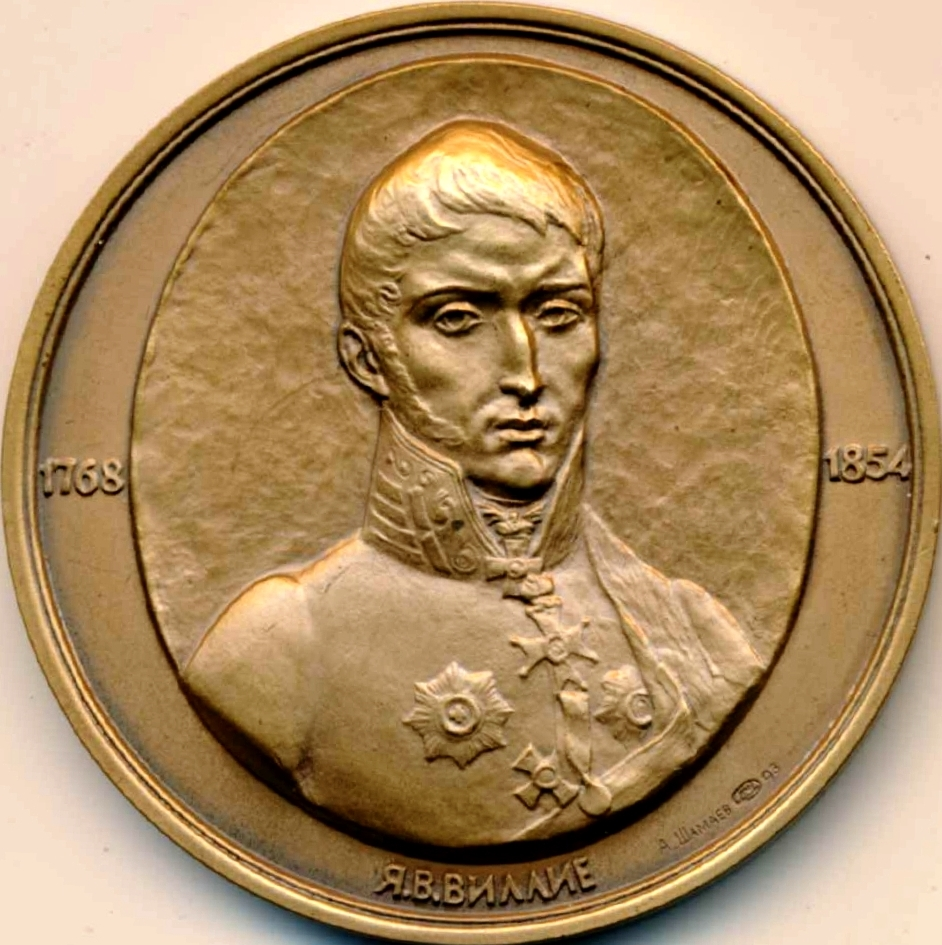
Medal: 225th anniversary of birth 1993

Russia

- Diploma of Nobility of the Russian Empire 1847. Baronetcy 1824. Coat of Arms 1825.
- Court Councillor 1798. Active State Councillor c. 1801–1805. Privy Councillor 1823. Active Privy Councillor 1841.
- Order of Saint Vladimir: 4th class 1804; 2nd class 1807; 1st class 1840.
- Order of Saint Anna: 1st class 1814; with diamond badges 1821.
- Order of Saint Alexander Nevsky: 1828; with diamond badge 1838.
- Military Council: member from 1812.
- Gold medal: 50 years' service to Russian medicine 1840.
- Brass medal: 225th anniversary of birth 1993.
- State Medical Collegium: Honorary Member (1800) and Dean (1810–1813).

Other countries

- Austria. Order of Leopold: Commander's Cross.
- Baden. Order of Merit.
- Bavaria. Order of Merit of the Bavarian Crown: Commander.
- France. Legion of Honour: Knight 1814.
- Prussia. Order of the Red Eagle: Commander 1813, Grand Cross 1835. Diamond ring from Queen of Prussia 1808.
- United Kingdom. Knighthood 1814. Baronetcy and Coat of Arms 1814.
- United States. American Philosophical Society: Member 1821.
- Württemberg. Order of the Crown: Commander 1818.

== Personal life ==
Although twice venturing marriage, Wylie remained a bachelor. Marriage to an Englishwoman in 1815 did not eventuate after he declined relocation to England. Wedding arrangements in 1823 collapsed when injuries from a carriage rollover required his protracted recovery in bed.

He remained on excellent terms with his family. Visiting Saint Petersburg, his mother was received by tsar Alexander "with all the pomp accorded by one monarch to another". She caused astonishment attending church back home wearing her son's gifts of Indian shawl and gold spectacles.

He enjoyed vigorous sports and pastimes, but is also described as "one of the most cultured people of his era, a polyglot, a bibliophile, and lover of literature"; on good terms with prominent figures in Russian literature, culture, and journalism; dining with them weekly.

His health remained sound until his last days; with excellent memory and lively interest in literature and current affairs. Despite his elevated status, he preferred the company of his circle of Russian doctors, and for his later years a routine of informal lunches had been established at his suggestion.

He died extremely wealthy at Saint Petersburg on 11 February 1854 OS; being interred at Saint Petersburg's Volkovo Lutheran Cemetery with full imperial honours, attended by tsar Nicholas and Court notables.

His 1852 will advised that liquidated assets remaining after " ...erecting a monument to me ...the sums which will thus remain undisposed of by me, I most humbly lay at the feet of His Imperial Majesty ...and I venture to express the wish that this sum may he employed ...for some establishments of public or charitable benefit which shall bear my name".

A small component of his assets was disputed by relatives in Scotland on grounds of not being included in his will. This was his 1814 deposit of £50,000 into British funds; intended for purchasing an estate in Scotland but unused; its eventual value £68,000. Protracted legal proceedings ended with the House of Lords determining in their favour.

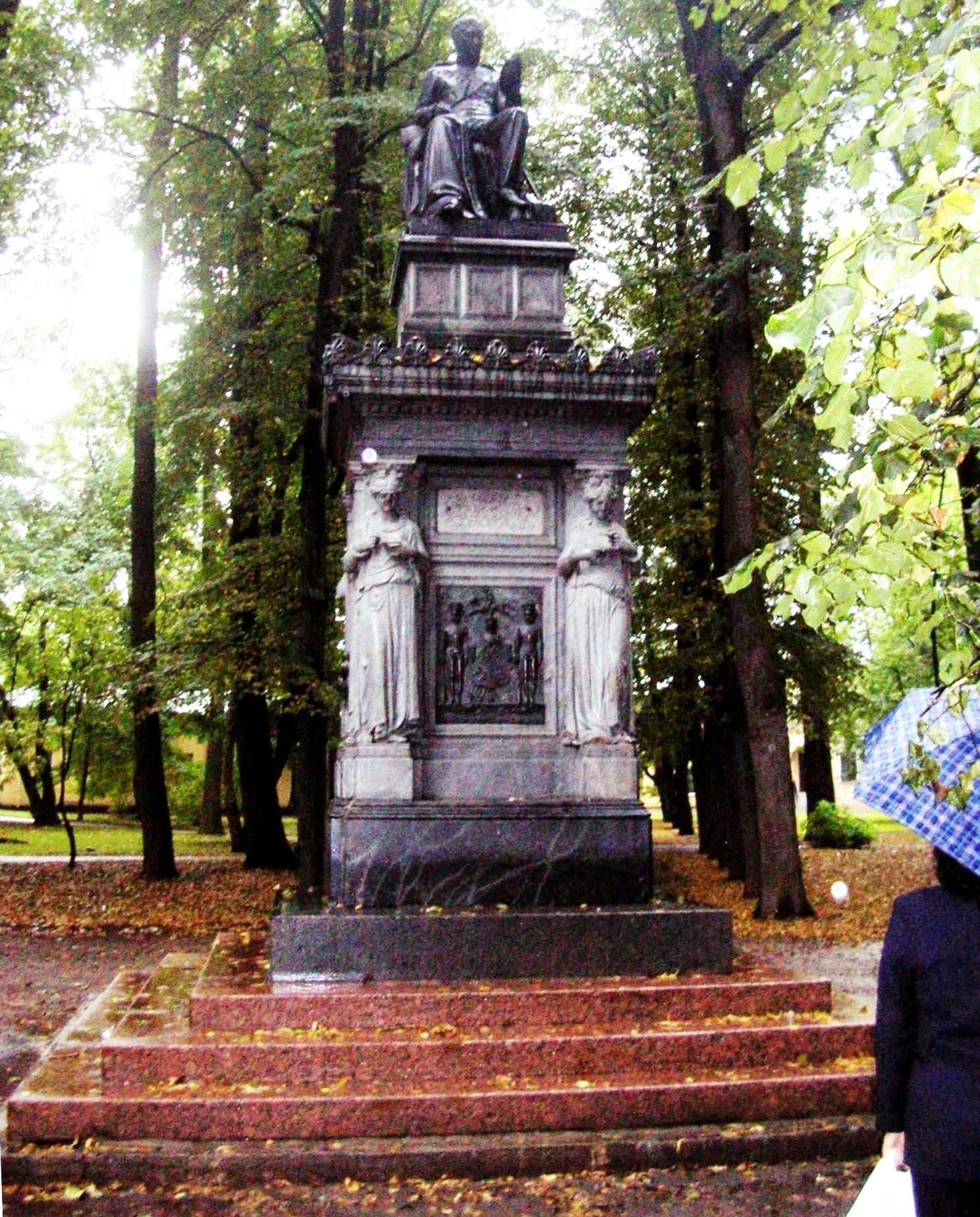
Wylie's monument

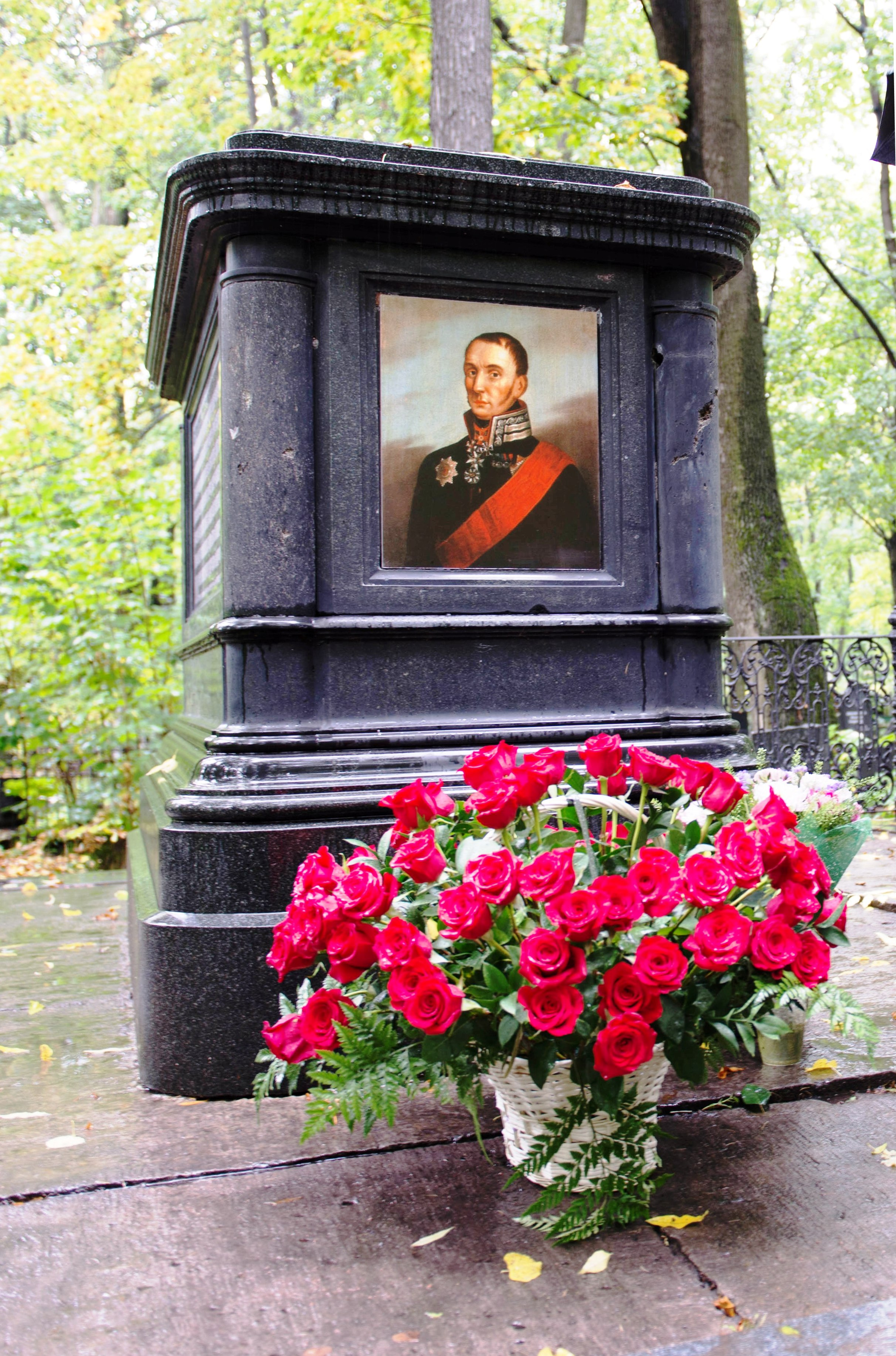
Wylie's Sarcophagus: Volkovo Cemetery

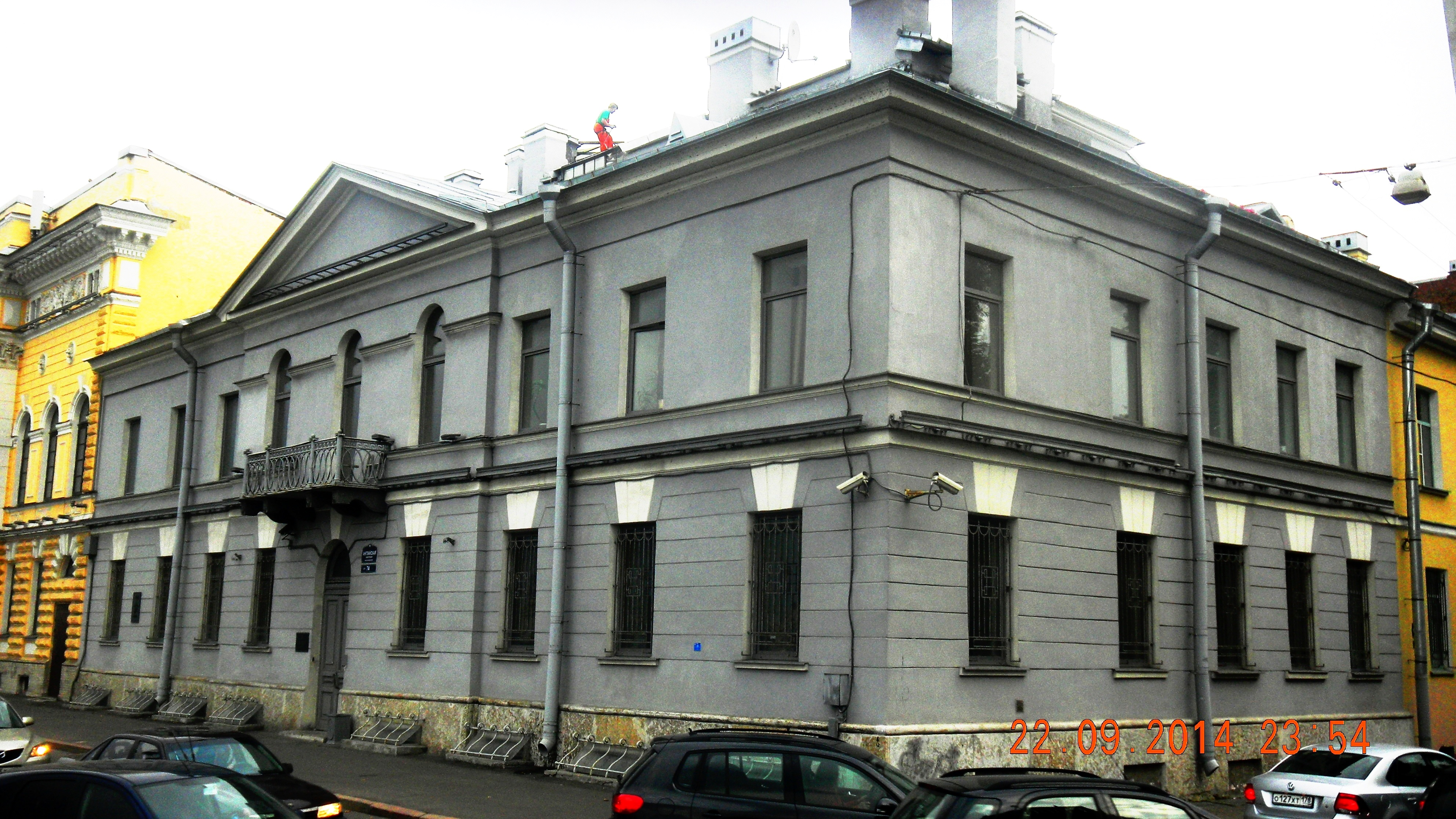
Wylie's Saint Petersburg home

== Memory ==
=== Statue ===
Regarding the will's first request; approval was given for his stature in front of the Military Medical Academy.

Completed in 1859, a bronze sculpture rests upon a black marble pedestal, Hygeia at each corner. The sides of the pedestal feature bronze panels showing scenes from his career and his coat of arms.

In 1948, during Joseph Stalin's anti-cosmopolitan campaign, the Academy was ordered to remove it and schedule its destruction. This was backed by a smear campaign declaring Wylie an English spy, all duly reported by communist party mouthpiece Leningradskaya Pravda. One individual wrote that Wylie was never able to speak Russian, surrounded himself with incompetent foreign careerists, oversaw a run-down in military medicine, and drove Russian doctors from his hospitals.

At huge personal risk, Academy head Orbeli had the monument dismantled and hidden within crates. Reassembled in 1964 within the academy's park, it was later decreed cultural heritage.

=== Other ===
Regarding the will's second request; the Mikhailovskaya Baronet Wylie Clinical Hospital was opened beside the Military Medical Academy in 1873 in the presence of Alexander II. It's five buildings were assembled into a 'W' shape in Wylie's honour. Academy clinics were relocated there.

In a nod to Wylie's motto, the Academy's is Labore et Scientia, Arte et Humanitates. Inside hang two paintings of him and his stylised torso drawn in profile on painted glass separating adjacent rooms.

His sarcophagus at Saint Petersburg's Volkovo Lutheran Cemetery, a federal heritage site, features his portrait plus inscriptions on its sides describing his services to Russia.

At Kincardine-on-Forth, a plaque was unveiled in 2004 honouring its famous son.

An information panel is affixed at a property on Saint Petersburg's English Embankment that Wylie purchased in 1809 and rebuilt. He resided there from 1838. Its residents included Academy graduate and obstetrician Alexander Blank and his family for some years from 1832; a daughter born there in 1835 becoming Maria Ulyanova, mother of V.I. Lenin.

Translated as Villier, Wylie is briefly mentioned in Tolstoy's War and Peace.

== Bibliography for the life and times of James Wylie ==
Books

- Appleby, John (1 September 1987). "Through the looking glass; Scottish doctors in Russia". In The Caledonian Phalanx: Scots in Russia. National Library of Scotland: Edinburgh.
- Bariatinskiǐ Vladimir V. (1929). Le Mystère d'Alexandre Ier; le Tsar a-t-il Survécu Sous le Nom de Fédor Kousmitch? Payot: Paris.
- Cate, Curtis (1985). The War of the Two Emperors: the Dual between Napoleon and Alexander: Russia 1812. Random House: New York.
- Gordon, T. (1960). Four Notable Scots. Aneas Mackay: Stirling.
- Lieven, Dominic (2009). Russia Against Napoleon, the Battle for Europe, 1807 to 1814. Allan Lane: London.
- McGrigor, Mary (2010). The Tsar's Doctor. The Life and Times of Sir James Wylie. Birlinn Limited: Edinburgh.
- Mieklejohn, William (1990). Four Lads o' Pairts &c. How and Blackwell: Berwik-upon-Tweed.
- Olivier, Daria (1973). Alexandre Ier: prince des illusions. Fayard: Paris.
- Strakhovsky, Leonid (1947). Alexander I of Russia: The Man who Defeated Napoleon. W.W. Norton & Co: New York.
- Troubetzkoy, Alexis (2002). Imperial Legend, the Mysterious Disappearance of Tsar Alexander I. Arcade Publishing: New York.
- Zamoyski, Adam (2004). 1812: Napoleon's Fatal March on Moscow. HarperCollins: London.

Journals

- Fisun, A.Ya., Porokhov, S.Yu. (2018). "Yakov Vasil'evich Villie: Over half a century in the service of military medicine of the Russian Empire and Medical-Surgical Academy (on the 250th anniversary of his birth)". Journal of the S.M. Kirov Military Medical Academy. 4(64):300–304.
- Gumanenko, E.K.; et al. (2014). "Yakov Vasil'evich Villie (1768–1854) — surgeon – organiser of the military medical service of Russia". Journal of the S.M. Kirov Military Medical Academy.
- Müller-Dietz, H. (1969). "J. Wylie und die Mediko-chirurgische Akademie in St. Petersburg: zum 200 Geburtstag von Sir James Wylie". Cleo Medica. 4:99–107.
- Novik A., et al. (August 1996). "The life and times of Sir James Wylie Bt., MD., 1768–1854, body surgeon and physician to the czar and chief of the Russian Military Medical Department". Scottish Medical Journal. 41(4):116–120.
- Shabunin, A., Semple, P. (1999). "Achievements in Russia of Sir James Wylie, Bt., MD. a Scottish graduate". Proceedings of the Royal College of Physicians of Edinburgh. 29:76–82.
- Wilson, J. (April and May 1973). "Three Scots in the service of the czars". The Practitioner. 10:572–574, and 706–708.
- Zaytsev, E.I. (2009). "Yakov Vasil'evich Villie 1768–1854". The I. I. Grekov Journal of Surgery. 168(4):9–11.
