= Pieter Klazes Pel =

Dutch physician and professor of internal medicine

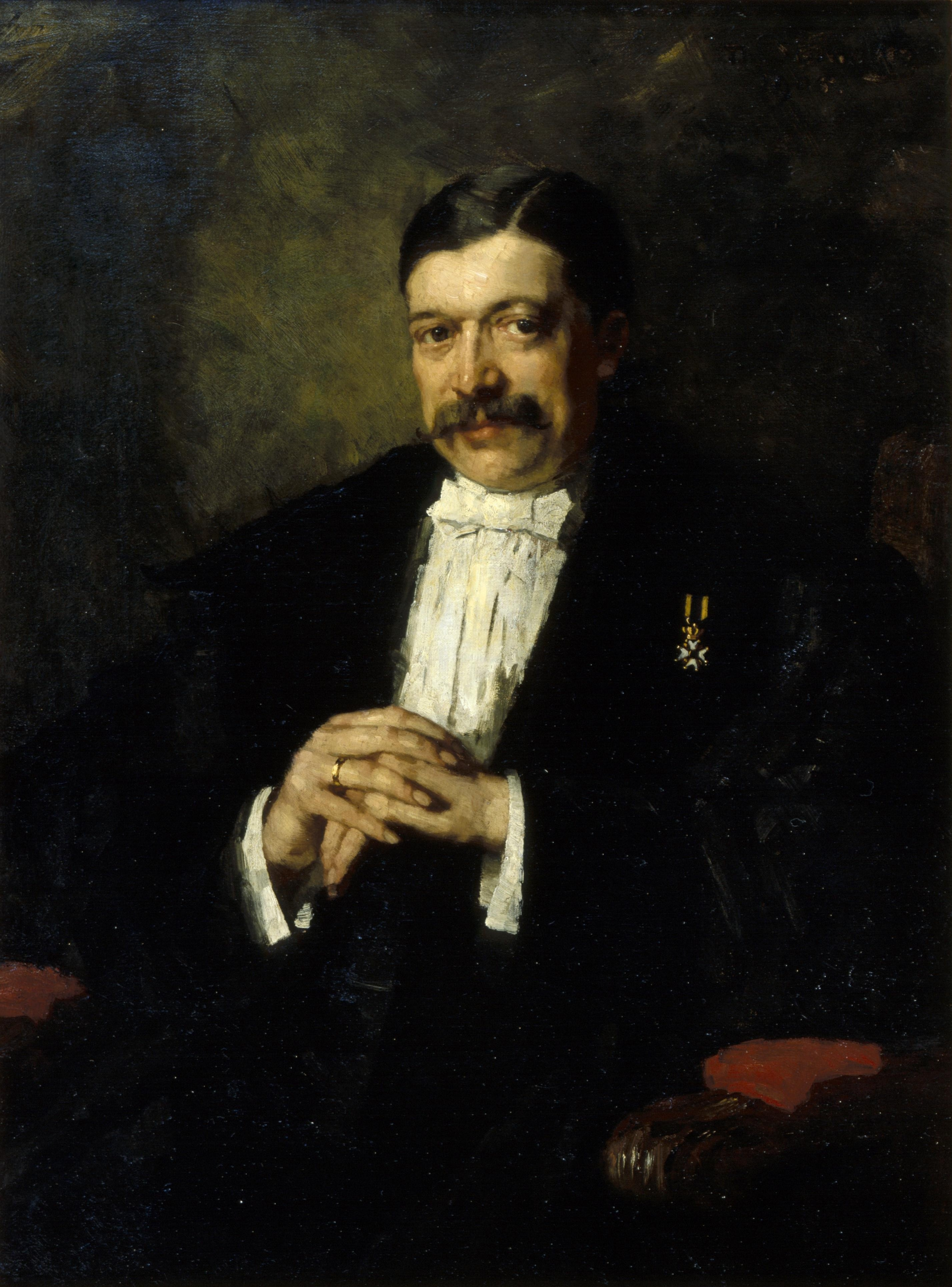
Pel by Isaac Israëls

Professor Pieter Klazes Pel (February 22, 1852 in Smallingerland – February 15, 1919) was a Dutch physician and professor of internal medicine.

== Medical education ==
Pel attended the gymnasium at Sneek, then moved to study medicine in Leiden from 1869 to 1873. He became the assistant to one of his mentors, a Dr. Rosenstein, who was a professor of internal medicine at Leiden. Pel graduated cum laude in 1876. His doctoral thesis was entitled "The Fever Inducing Effect of Digitaline."

== Career ==
In 1878 Pel was appointed "chef de clinique” at the University Hospital in Amsterdam, and devoted himself to internal medicine—both as a physician and as a researcher. In Pel's time, this meant all aspects of medicine besides surgery and gynecology; internal medicine was an extremely vast field. In 1880, Pel was appointed Lecturer in Contagious Diseases and Physiological Diagnostics. In 1883 he became a full Professor of Internal Medicine. In 1891 he was invited to go to Leiden University, but decided to stay in Amsterdam.

== Notable contributions in medicine ==
Pel is perhaps best known for his description in 1885 of Pel–Ebstein fever, a cyclical fever that occurs very rarely in individuals who have Hodgkin's Lymphoma. Pel described in the Berliner Klinische Wochenschrift the cases of two patients who had periods of fever for 12–14 days, alternating with about 10 days of fever-free periods. Pel noted on post-mortem examination splenomegaly (enlarged spleen) as well as swelling of the lymph nodes. In 1887, German physician Wilhelm Ebstein described a similar case in the same publication. A polemic between the two followed over whether this phenomenon was a symptom of what was then called "pseudo-leukemia" (Pel) or that of a separate disease (Ebstein).

Pel also discovered what came to be called "Pel's crisis," defined as "Ocular crises in tabes dorsalis, characterized by neuralgic paroxysmal pains affecting the eyes and the ophthalmic area(s)." The term "Pel's crisis", however, is no longer commonly used, in favor of "tabetic ocular crisis".

Pel shared the opinion of Sir William Osler, a contemporary of his, that the way to teach and train new physicians is at the bedsides of patients, rather than at a desk listening to lectures. Osler considered bringing students out of classrooms and into hospital wards—to learn by experience—to be his greatest legacy, and he is credited today as the father of the modern medical residency. Pel gave his inaugural speech on the importance of bedside medical teaching, which serves as a good example of the level of importance he ascribed to the adoption of this practice. Additionally, Pel was quoted as saying, "Whereas, formerly, the sick patient functioned primarily as an example or illustration of the dominating theoretical education, in the modern world the careful, objective examination of the patient warrants priority attention."

On a slightly different note, Pel was also quoted as saying, "When someone tells me that an animal on four feet is walking around in the yard next door, it could be a small tiger or elephant, but I still would rather think of a cat or a dog.” This quote is similar to a common anecdote that is still used in hospitals and medical schools—"When you hear hoofbeats, think horses—not zebras,"—and it is unclear whether the phrase quoted by Pel was originally his, or if he was reciting an adaptation of the modern common anecdote with zebras and horses.
