= Siege of Silistra (1828) =

1829 battle of the Russo-Turkish War (1828–1829)

- Part of the Russo-Turkish War
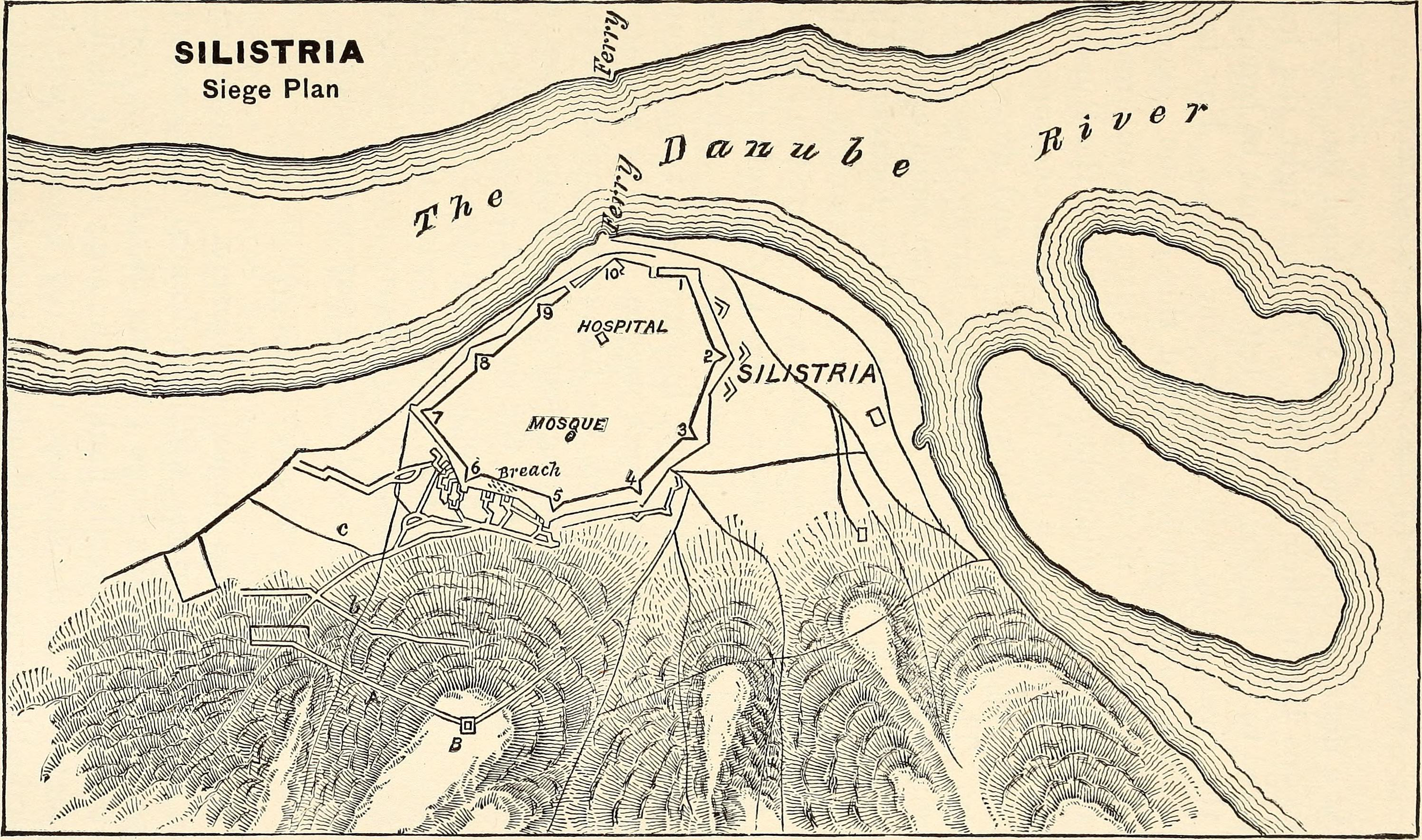
- Silistra Castle
Date	21 July – 8 November 1828
Location	Silistra 44°07′07″N 27°15′37″E
Result	Ottoman victory

Belligerents
Ottoman Empire	Russian Empire

Commanders and leaders
(Ottoman Empire) Ahmed Pasha	(Russian Empire) Peter Wittgenstein (Russian Empire) Louis de Langeron (Russian Empire) Loggin Osipovich Roth (Russian Empire) Georgi Mamarchev

Strength
12,000	30,000

Casualties and losses
3,000 killed and wounded	7,000 killed and wounded

The siege of Silistra (July 21 – November 8, 1828) was an unsuccessful Russian siege during the Russo-Turkish War, 1828–1829.

== Siege ==
General Roth, who besieged Silistra on July 21, had 10,000 men and 36 cannons under his command. In response to the heavy artillery fire of the Russian side throughout August, the Turkish garrison managed to inflict losses on the besiegers with sortie operations.

On September 11, in order to ensure that the military troops and ammunition reinforcements coming from Shumen could enter the castle, the attack was made with the support of heavy artillery fire from the castle, and 5,000 additional Turkish soldiers and ammunition entered the Silistra castle.

The effective exit from the castle on September 27 cost the Russian army more than 2,000 casualties, compared to the Turkish garrison's loss of 500 soldiers. After heavy losses, the besieging Russian army was reinforced with the 2nd Infantry Corps and 62 siege guns coming from Russian Empire. In this way, the total number of Russian siege troops in front of Silistra reached 25,000 soldiers (30,000 towards the end of the siege). In addition, the Russian army aimed to bring the 3rd Corps, one of the armies besieging Shumen, to Silistra and intensify their attacks and capture the castle as soon as possible, but due to the autumn conditions making the roads increasingly impassable. He could not implement these plans.

Although the Russian army launched a two-day general attack on the castle on November 2, they suffered heavy losses. The surrender offer sent to the castle by the Russian army, who thought that the attack had shaken the Turkish garrison, was also rejected. As a result of the 111-day siege, the Tür garrison suffered approximately 3,000 casualties and the Russian army lost more than 7,000.

Thereupon, in the face of the danger of winter approaching, the Russian army lifted the siege on November 8, 1828, and began to retreat north of Danube towards Wallachia.
