= Ahmad Pasha =

Ahmad Pasha or Ahmed Pasha or Ahmet Pasha may refer to:

- Gedik Ahmed Pasha (died 1482), Ottoman grand vizier (1474–77)
- Dukakinzade Ahmed Pasha (died 1515), Ottoman grand vizier (1514–15)
- Hersekzade Ahmed Pasha (1459–1517), Ottoman grand vizier (various times 1497–1516)
- Hain Ahmed Pasha (died 1524), Ottoman governor of Egypt (1523–24) who declared himself Sultan of Egypt
- Kara Ahmed Pasha (died 1555), Ottoman grand vizier (1553–55)
- Ahmed-paša Dugalić (fl. 1598–1605), Ottoman governor of Bosnia, Belgrade and Temeşvar
- Ahmad Pasha ibn Ridwan (died 1607), Ottoman governor of Damascus and Gaza
- Hadım Hafız Ahmed Pasha (died 1613), Ottoman governor of Egypt (1590–94)
- Hafız Ahmed Pasha (1564–1632), Ottoman grand vizier (1625–26, 1631–32)
- Bakırcı Ahmed Pasha (died 1635/1636), Ottoman governor of Egypt (1633–35)
- Köprülü Fazıl Ahmed Pasha (1635–1676), Ottoman grand vizier (1661–76)
- Claude Alexandre de Bonneval (1675–1747), French army officer who worked for Ottomans
- Ahmad Pasha of Baghdad (r. 1723–1747), Georgian Mamluk ruler of Iraq
- Seyyid Emir Ahmed Pasha (died 1753), Ottoman Janissary chief and governor of Sidon and Aleppo
- Ahmad Pasha al-Jazzar, (died 1804) Ottoman governor of Acre, Sidon and Damascus (1776–1804)
- Hurshid Ahmed Pasha (died 1822), Ottoman grand vizier (1812–15) and governor of Egypt (1804–05)
- Müftizade Ahmed Pasha (died 1824), Ottoman governor of various provinces, including Egypt (1803)
- Ahmad Rifaat Pasha (1825–1858), member of the Muhammad Ali Dynasty of Egypt and heir presumptive to Sa'id Pasha
- Ahmed Muhtar Pasha (1839–1919), Ottoman general
- Ahmad Zaki Pasha (1867–1934), Egyptian philologist and secretary of the Egyptian Cabinet
- Ahmed Izzet Pasha (1864–1937), Ottoman general
- Izzet Ahmed Pasha (1798–1876), Ottoman governor of various provinces
- Ahmad Ziwar Pasha (1864–1945), former Egyptian prime minister (1924–1926)
- Ahmad Mahir Pasha (1888–1945), Egyptian prime minister 1944–1945
- Ahmad Shuja Pasha (born 1952), Pakistani general and director of the ISI

== See also ==
- Ahmad (name)
- Pasha (title)
