= Continuous fever =

Type of fever

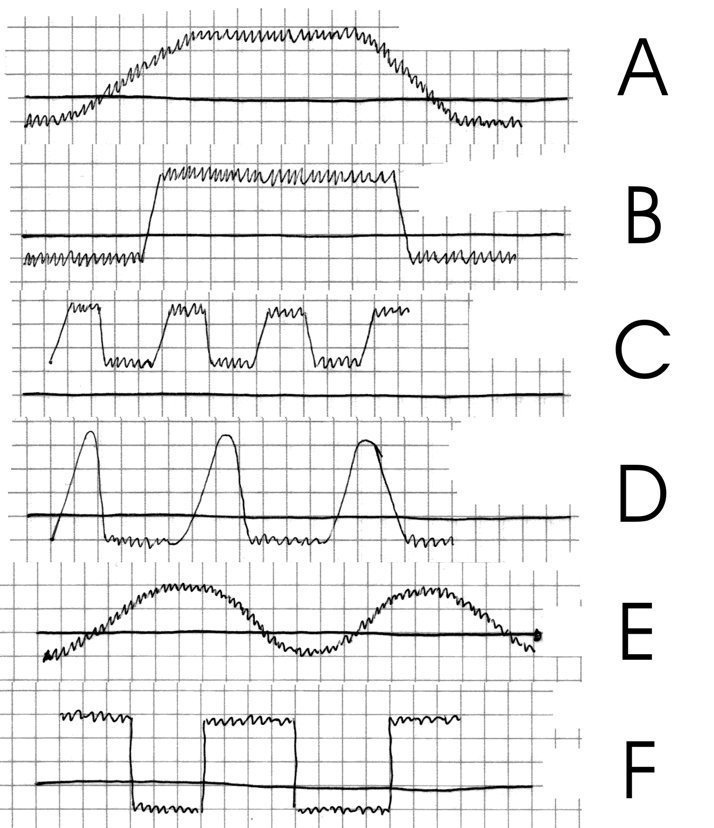
Performance of the various types of fever a) Fever continues b) Fever continues to abrupt onset and remission c) Remittent fever d) Intermittent fever e) Undulant fever f) Relapsing fever

Continuous fever is a type or pattern of fever in which temperature does not touch the baseline and remains above normal throughout the day. The variation between maximum and minimum temperature in 24 hours is less than 1°C (1.5°F). It usually occurs due to some infectious disease. Diagnosis of continuous fever is usually based on the clinical signs and symptoms but some biological tests, chest X-ray and CT scan are also used. Typhoid fever is an example of continuous fever and it shows a characteristic step-ladder pattern, a step-wise increase in temperature with a high plateau.

== Examples ==
Continuous fever is manifested in following diseases.

- Typhoid fever
- Fungal diseases.

== Management ==
Management is usually symptomatic. Antipyretics like ibuprofen and paracetamol are used for lowering body temperature and body aches. Antibiotics are also recommended for treating infectious diseases. Antibiotics used in treatment of infectious diseases include chloramphenicol, cefotaxime, ciprofloxacin, gentamicin and amikacin.

== See also ==
- Intermittent fever
- Relapsing fever
- Undulant fever
- Remittent fever
- Neutropenic fever
