= Wilhelm Ebstein =

German physician (1836–1912)

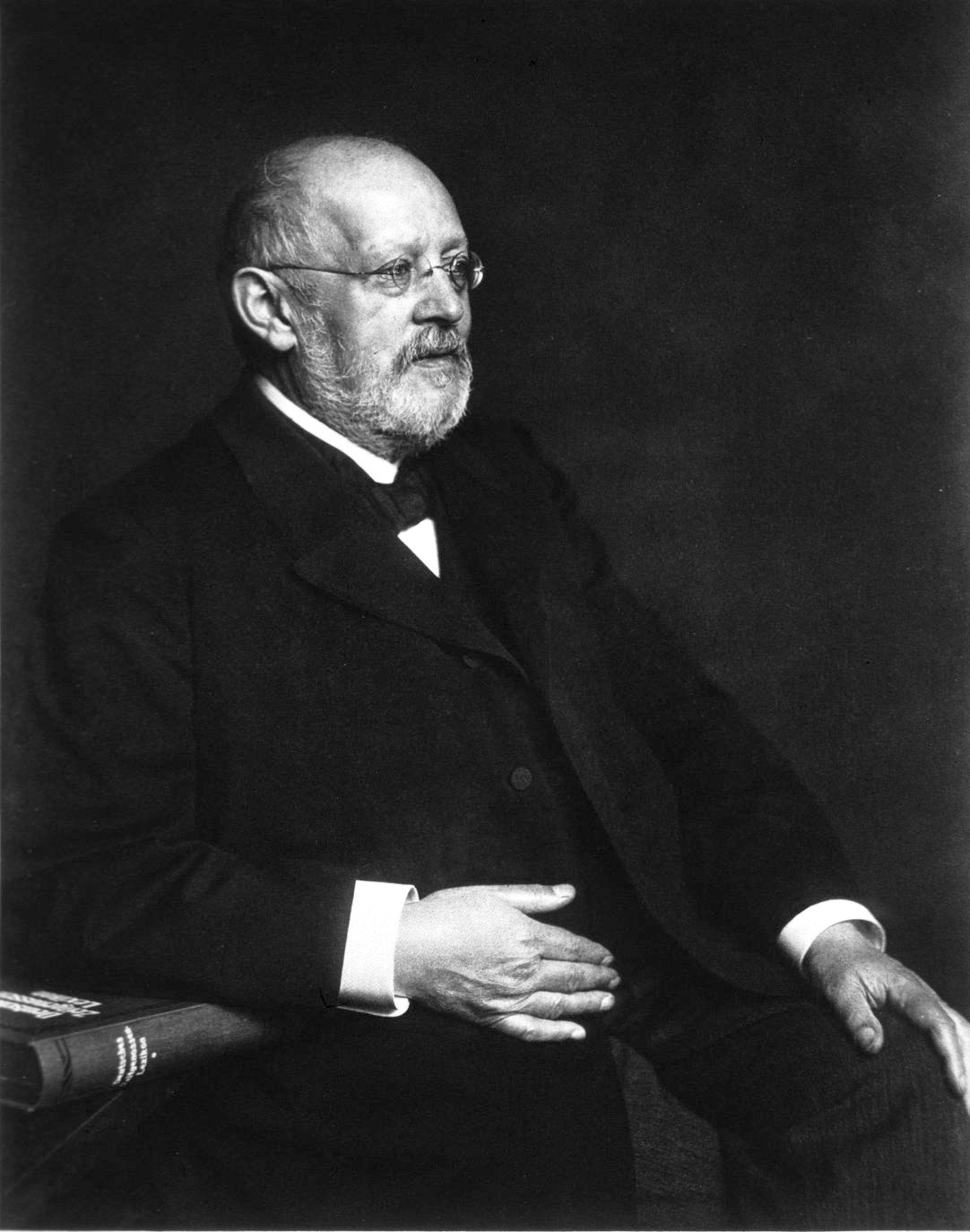
- Born: 27 November 1836; Jauer, Prussia (modern Jawor, Poland)
- Died: 22 October 1912 (aged 75); Göttingen, Germany
- Occupations: Physician, writer

Wilhelm Ebstein (27 November 1836, Jauer, Prussian Silesia – 22 October 1912) was a German physician. He proposed a low-carbohydrate high-fat diet to treat obesity. Ebstein's anomaly is named for him.

== Biography ==
Ebstein was born to a Jewish family in Jauer, Prussian Silesia (modern Jawor, Poland). He studied medicine at the University of Breslau under Friedrich Theodor von Frerichs and at the University of Berlin under Rudolf Virchow and Moritz Heinrich Romberg, graduating from the latter institution in 1859. During the same year he was named physician at the Allerheiligen Hospital in Breslau. In 1868 he became chief physician at the "Findelhaus" (municipal poorhouse); and from 1874 was a professor at the University of Göttingen, where he subsequently served as director of the university hospital and dispensary (from 1877). Ebstein was an early advocate of a low-carbohydrate diet. He authored Die Fettleibigkeit (Corpulenz), which recommended a low-carbohydrate, high-fat diet for treating obesity. It restricted carbohydrates by forbidding potatoes, sugar and sweets. All sorts of meat were recommended including fat meats. His daily menu permitted "two or three glasses of light wine" but shunned beer.

Ebstein authored medical studies on diabetes, gout and obesity. He died at age 75 in Göttingen.

== Achievements ==
Ebstein's specialties were studies of malassimilation and improper nutrition, of which he introduced a number of new procedures for treatment. This included the virtual elimination of carbohydrates from the diet, while allowing fat to be administered with adequate protein; Ebstein believed that fat contained a nutritive value equivalent to two and a half times that of carbohydrates. The following works are related to dietary and metabolism issues:

- "Die Fettleibigkeit (Corpulenz) und ihre Behandlung nach physiologischen Grundsätzen"., 7th ed., Wiesbaden, 1882 - Obesity And Its Handling According To Physiological Principles
- "Fett oder Kohlenhydrate", Wiesbaden, 1885 - "Fat or Carbohydrates."
- "Wasserentziehung und Anstrengende Muskelbewegungen," ib. 1885 - Dehydration and strenuous muscle movements.
- Max Joseph Oertel: "Die Ebsteinsche Flugschrift über Wasserentziehung", Leipzig, 1885) - Ebstein's pamphlet on dehydration. Ebstein was a leading expert in regards to research of dehydration.

Other noteworthy works by Ebstein include:

- "Nierenkrankheiten Nebst den Affectionen der Nierenbecken und der Urnieren", in von Ziemssen's "Handbuch der Speziellen Pathologie und Therapie", 2d ed., vol. ix. - Kidney disease and also affections of the renal pelvis and mesonephros.
- "Traumatische Leukämie," in "Deutsche Med. Wochenschrift," 1894 - Traumatic leukemia.
- "Handbuch der Praktischen Medizin," ib. 1899 - Manual of practical medicine.
- "Die Medizin im Alten Testament," Stuttgart, 1901 - Medicine of the Old Testament.
- "Handbuch der Praktischen Medizin," (with Gustav Schwalbe), ib. 1901
- "Die Krankheiten im Feldzuge Gegen Russland," ib. 1902 - On diseases experienced on a campaign to Russia.
- "Dorf- und Stadthygiene," ib. 1902 - Village and city hygiene.
- "Die Medizin in Bibel und Talmud" - Medicine in the (New Testament and Talmud), ib. 1903.

Ebstein also published works in regards to medical illness of prominent Germans in history, such as Martin Luther and Arthur Schopenhauer.

His name was attached to the eponymous Ebstein's anomaly (a rare congenital heart defect) and Pel–Ebstein fever (a remittent fever associated with Hodgkin's disease).

== Bibliography ==
- Pagel, J. L., Biographisches Lexikon, s.v.
- Meyers Konversations-Lexikon, s.v.
- Brockhaus, Konversations-Lexikon, s.v.
