= Deli Emir Ahmed Agha =

Ottoman official (died 1753)

Deli Emir Ahmed Agha (Turkish: Deli Emir Ahmed Ağa, "Emir Ahmed Agha the Mad"; died November 1753), later known as Seyyid Emir Ahmed Pasha, was an Ottoman statesman and military leader.

Raised as a member of the elite infantry unit, the Janissaries, he was its Agha (chief) from May 1750 to January 1751. Later, he served as the governor of the Sidon Eyalet (1751, 1752–53) and the Aleppo Eyalet (1751–52). He was of Turkish origin. and his lineage is based on Ishak of Karaman.
