= Intermittent fever =

Pattern of fever

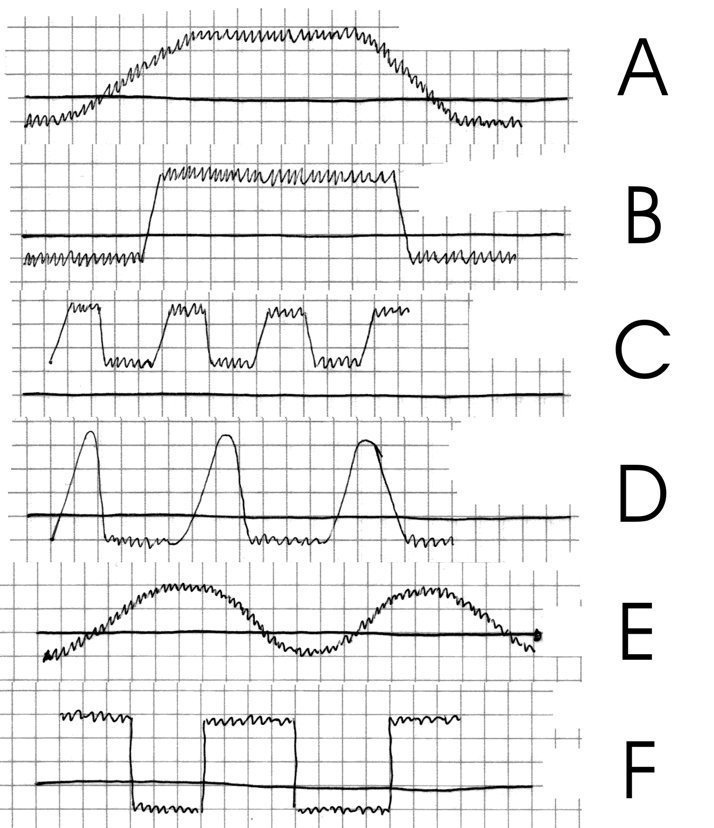
Performance of the various types of fever a) Fever continues b) Fever continues to abrupt onset and remission c) Remittent fever d) Intermittent fever e) Undulant fever f) Relapsing fever

Intermittent fever is a type or pattern of fever in which there is an interval where temperature is elevated for several hours followed by an interval when temperature drops back to normal. This type of fever usually occurs during the course of an infectious disease. Diagnosis of intermittent fever is frequently based on the clinical history but some biological tests like complete blood count and blood culture are also used. In addition radiological investigations like chest X-ray, abdominal ultrasonography can also be used in establishing diagnosis.

== Intermittent fever in malaria ==
Malaria is a common cause of intermittent fever and it has following types.

=== Quotidian fever ===
Bouts of fever occurring daily (24-hour periodicity) for a few hours, typical of Plasmodium falciparum.

=== Tertian fever ===
Fever occurs after an interval of two days (48-hour periodicity), typical of Plasmodium vivax and Plasmodium ovale.

=== Quartan fever ===
Fever occurs after an interval of three days (72-hour periodicity), typical of Plasmodium falciparum.

== Examples ==
=== Infectious causes of intermittent fever ===
The following are examples of infectious diseases that may feature intermittent fever.

- Malaria
- Tuberculosis
- Sepsis
- Kala azar
- Borreliosis (Lyme disease)
- Rat-bite fever
- Epstein-barr virus
- Chronic meningococcemia.

=== Inflammatory causes of intermittent fever ===
Adult-onset Still's disease is an inflammatory disease that may cause intermittent fever, characteristically a quotidian fever that spikes once or twice in the late afternoon to evening.

== Management ==
Antipyretics like ibuprofen and paracetamol are used for fever and body aches. Antibiotics are also used for any underlying infection. For treating malaria, anti-malarial drugs like quinine, chloroquine and primaquine are given.

== See also ==
- Continuous fever
- Relapsing fever
- Undulant fever
- Remittent fever
- Neutropenic fever
- Cyclic fever; called Pel–Ebstein fever in Hodgkin's lymphoma
