= Deirdre Le Faye =

English writer (1933–2020)

Deirdre Le Faye (26 October 1933 – 16 August 2020) was an English writer and literary critic.

== Biography ==
Deirdre was born in Bournemouth and raised in Farnborough and Reading, during the bombing raids of the Second World War. After her father died of illness, she left school at 16 and began a secretarial course as a scholarship student. She began work as an administrative assistant for the Department of Medieval & Later Antiquities at the British Museum.

It was while working there that she began to join archaeological digs on weekends and holidays, as a way to take inexpensive vacations. She became a member of the Camden History Society and began to research graves and inscriptions. An interest in Jane Austen was rekindled, which led to her making contact with Austen family descendants living near Winchester. Using papers in the attic of these Austen-Leigh heirs, over the course of five years of weekends, while working full time at the British Museum, she updated and rewrote Jane Austen: A Family Record (1989). It was expanded, revised, and republished as A Family Record (2003), a factual biography of Austen.

She updated R. W. Chapman's published collection of Jane Austen's letters twice, in 1995 and 2011. She completed the massive A Chronology of Jane Austen and her Family, 1600-2000, as well as a cookbook, an edition of Austen's cousin's letters (Jane Austen’s ‘Outlandish Cousin’: the Life and Letters of Eliza de Feuillide), for a total of 12 monographs and edited books. She also published more than 90 articles between 1975 and 2020, many of them in The Jane Austen Society Report and Notes and Queries. She was a recipient of the Royal Society of Literature's Benson Medal in 2014. She was a member of the editorial board for Cambridge University Press's eight-volume edition of Jane Austen's novels and other manuscripts, 2005–8. She received an honorary DLitt from Southampton University in 2011.

Le Faye died on 16 August 2020, at the age of 86.

== Works ==
- Reminiscences of Caroline Austen.(Ed. with and intro. and notes by Deirdre Le Faye) (1986).
- Jane Austen: A Family Record (1989; 1993; Rev. Ed. 2004).
- Jane Austen's Letters (3rd ed., 1995; 4th ed., 2011).
- Writers' Lives: Jane Austen (1998).
- Fanny Knight’s Diaries: Jane Austen through her niece’s eyes (2000).
- Jane Austen's "Outlandish Cousin": The Life and Letters of Eliza de Feuillide (2002).
- Jane Austen: The World of Her Novels (2003).
- Jane Austen: A Family Record (2004).
- So You Think You Know Jane Austen? A Literary Quizbook (with John Sutherland, 2005).
- A Chronology of Jane Austen and Her Family (2006). 2nd ed. (2013).
- Jane Austen’s Steventon (2007)
- Jane Austen's Country Life (2014)
