= Remittent fever =

Pattern of fever

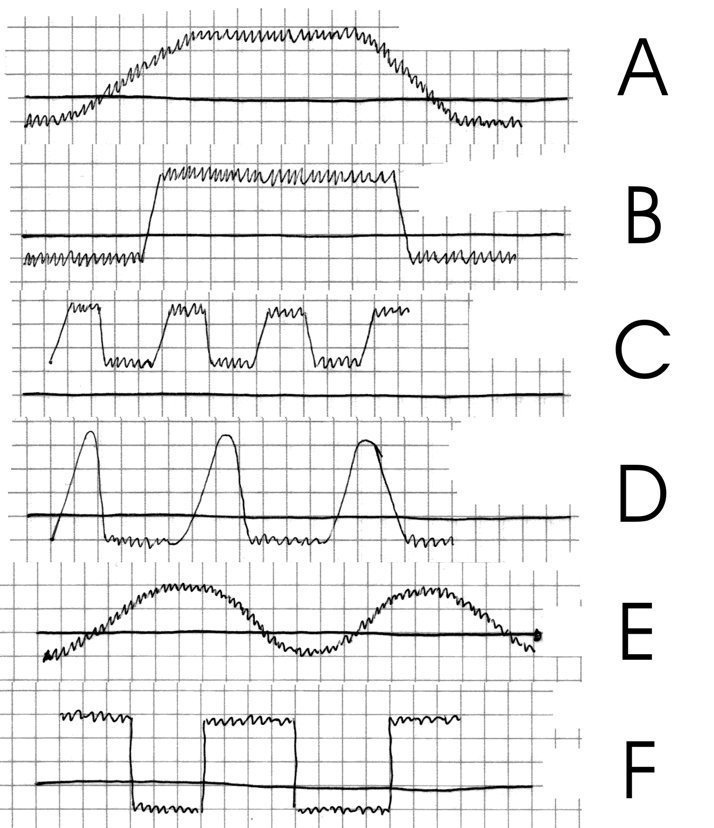
Performance of the various types of fever a) Fever continues b) Fever continues to abrupt onset and remission c) Remittent fever d) Intermittent fever e) Undulant fever f) Relapsing fever

Remittent fever is a type or pattern of fever in which temperature does not touch the baseline and remains above normal throughout the day. Daily variation in temperature is more than 1°C in 24 hours, which is also the main difference as compared to continuous fever. Fever due to most infectious diseases is remittent. Diagnosis is based upon clinical history, blood tests, blood culture and chest X-ray.

== Examples ==
Examples of remittent fever are as following.

- Infective endocarditis
- Typhoid
- Brucellosis

== Management ==
Management is carried out using antipyretics for fever and body aches. Antibiotics are used in case of infectious diseases and for infective endocarditis, in addition to antibiotics, cardiac valve prosthesis and mitral valve replacement surgery is used.

== See also ==
- Continuous fever
- Intermittent fever
- Relapsing fever
- Undulant fever
- Neutropenic fever
