= Pel–Ebstein fever =

- Other names: Ebstein–Cardarelli fever
- Symptoms: fever, enlargement of lymph nodes, night sweats

Pel–Ebstein fever is a rarely seen condition noted in patients with Hodgkin's lymphoma in which the patient experiences fevers which cyclically increase then decrease over an average period of one or two weeks. A cyclic fever may also be associated with other conditions, but it is not called "Pel–Ebstein fever" unless the fever is associated with Hodgkin's.

== Causes ==
The cause is currently unknown although speculation centers on host immune response – particularly the cyclical release of cytokines, lymph node necrosis, and damaged stromal cells.

== Diagnosis ==
Cyclical fever patterns typically require serial temperature measurements over time for detection, although some individuals may report subjective fluctuations in body temperature. When Pel–Ebstein fever is suspected, further diagnostic evaluation is necessary, including assessment for Hodgkin lymphoma if the diagnosis has not already been established.

== Treatment ==
Treatment with non-steroidal anti-inflammatory agents or treatment of the underlying Hodgkin's (usually with chemotherapy) will help the symptoms.

== Eponym ==
The condition is named after Wilhelm Ebstein and P. K. Pel who both published papers in 1887 noting the phenomenon. Both doctors published in the same journal, though Pel published first by several months. A long-term dispute persisted between Pel and Ebstein on the etiology of the condition.

== Controversy ==
Researchers have speculated whether this condition truly exists, since some authorities anecdotally estimate only a 5–10% occurrence rate. In his Lettsomian Lecture Making Sense, delivered to the Medical Society of London in 1959, Richard Asher refers to Pel–Ebstein fever as an example of a condition that exists only because it has a name: "Every student and every doctor knows that cases of Hodgkin's disease may show a fever that is high for one week and low for the next week and so on. Does this phenomenon really exist at all?..."
