= List of Russian physicians and psychologists =

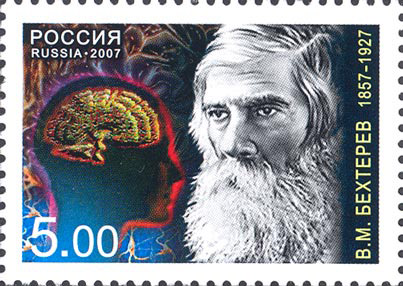
Vladimir Bekhterev, neuropathologist and psychologist

This list of Russian physicians and psychologists includes the famous physicians and psychologists, medical scientists and medical doctors from the Russian Federation, the Soviet Union, the Russian Empire and other predecessor states of Russia. Physicians of all specialties may be listed here.

== Alphabetical list ==
=== A ===
- Nikolai Amosov, prominent cardiovascular surgery developer, best-selling author

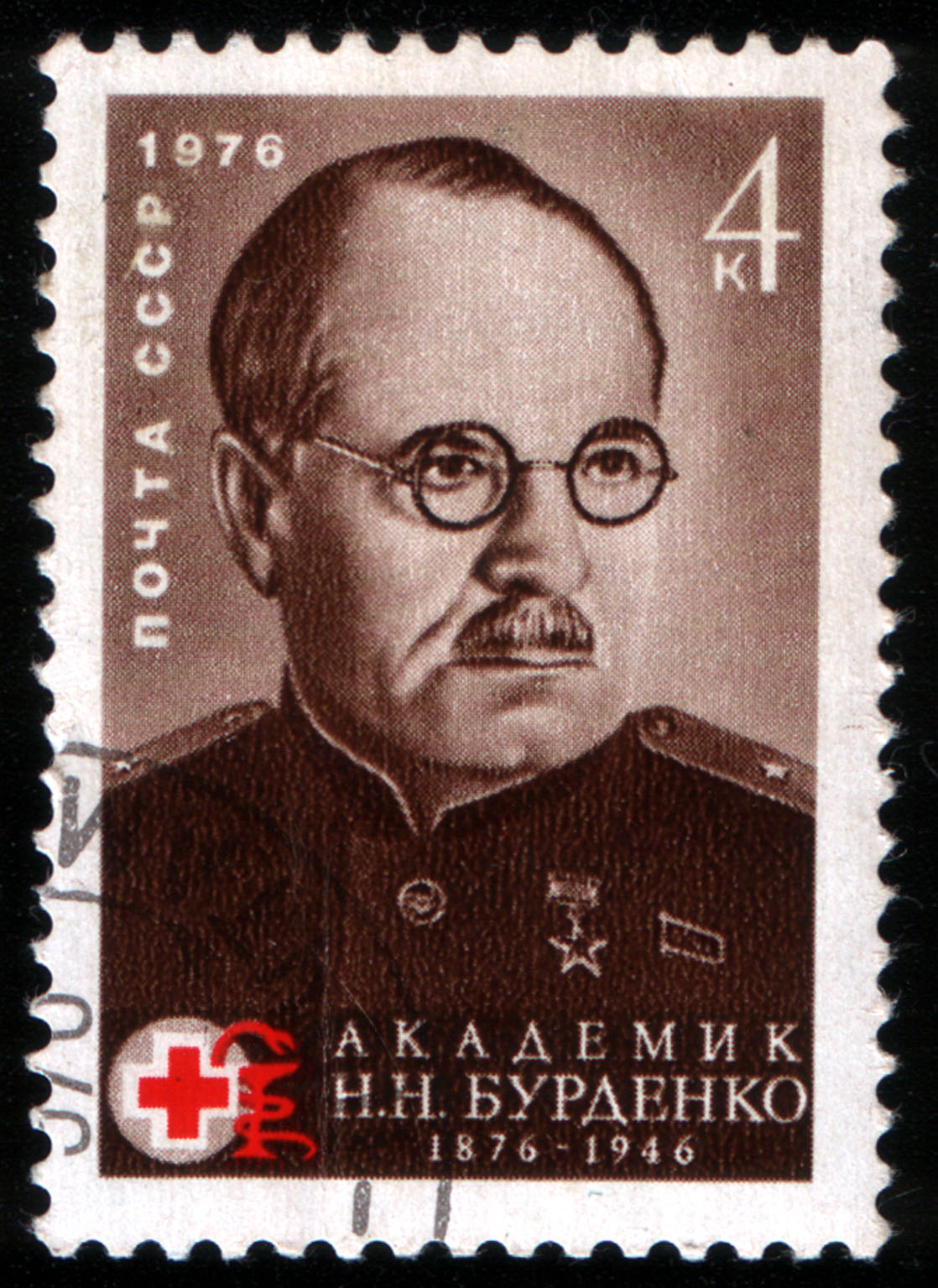
Burdenko

=== B ===
- Aleksandr Bakulev, prominent cardiovascular surgery developer
- Vladimir Bekhterev, neuropathologist, founder of objective psychology, noted the role of the hippocampus in memory, major contributor to reflexology, studied the Bekhterev’s Disease
- Vladimir Betz, discovered Betz cells of primary motor cortex
- Peter Borovsky, described the causative agent of Oriental sore
- Sergey Botkin, major therapist and court physician
- Nikolay Burdenko, major developer of neurosurgery
- Konstantin Buteyko, developed the Buteyko method for the treatment of asthma and other breathing disorders

=== C ===
- Mikhail Chumakov, co-discovered tick-borne encephalitis, co-developed oral polio vaccine

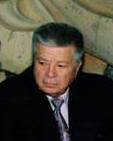
Fyodorov

=== D ===
- Livery Darkshevich, neurologist, described the nucleus of posterior commissure
- Vladimir Demikhov, major pioneer of transplantology

=== E ===
- Ekaterina Shabelskaya, psychologist, systemic family therapist, emotionally focused therapist, and supervisor

=== F ===
- Vladimir Filatov, ophthalmologist, corneal transplantation pioneer
- Svyatoslav Fyodorov, inventor of radial keratotomy

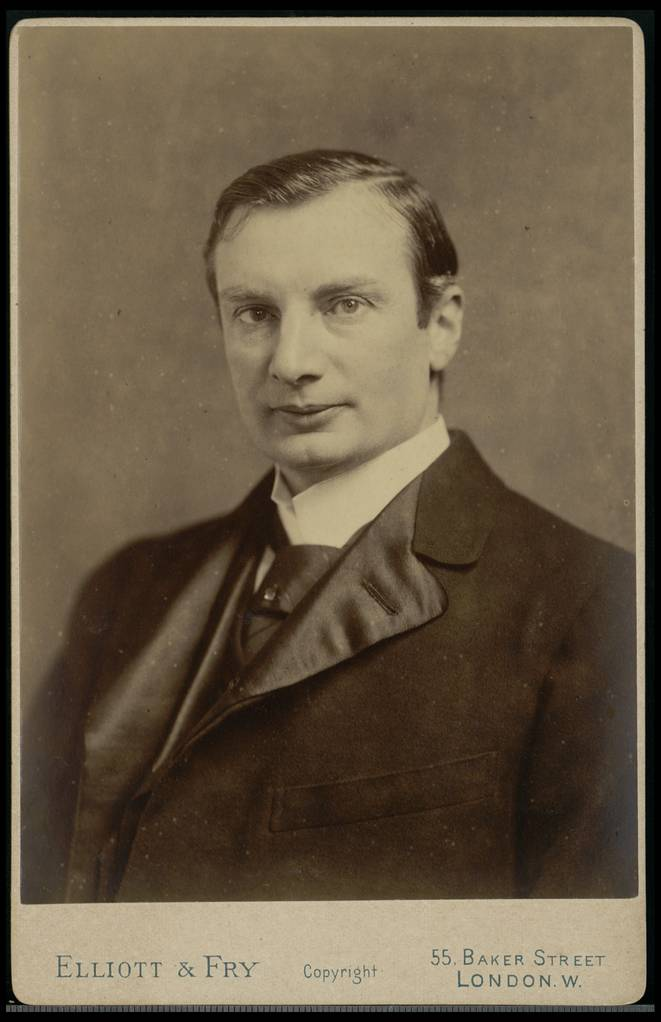
Haffkine

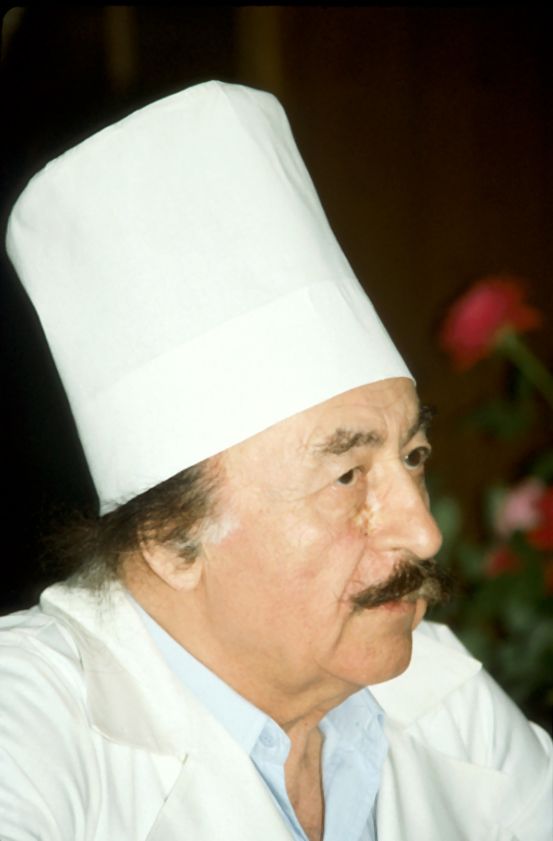
Ilizarov

=== G ===
- Pyotr Gannushkin, psychiatrist, pioneer researcher of psychopathies known today as personality disorders
- Oleg Gazenko, founder of space medicine, selected and trained Laika, the first space dog
- Georgy Gause, inventor of gramicidin S and other antibiotics
- Vera Gedroitz, world's first female professor of surgery
- Yuliya Gippenreyter, researcher in experimental psychology, family therapy and neuro-linguistic programming
- Ilya Gruzinov, found that vocal folds are the source of phonation

=== H ===
- Waldemar Haffkine, invented the first vaccines against cholera and bubonic plague

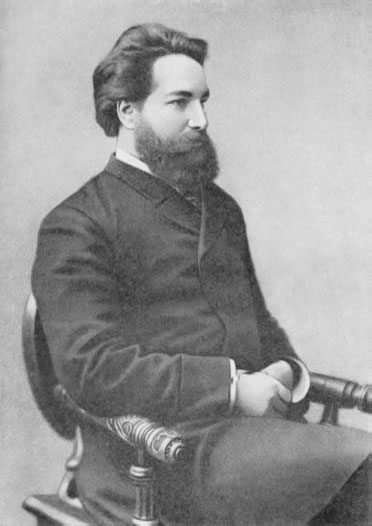
Korsakov

=== I ===
- Gavriil Ilizarov, invented Ilizarov apparatus, developed distraction osteogenesis
- Chingis Izmailov, psychophysiologist and psychophysicist, the principal author of the spherical model of color space.

=== K ===
- Nikolai Korotkov, invented auscultatory blood pressure measurement, pioneer of vascular surgery
- Sergey Korsakov, studied the effects of alcoholism on the nervous system, described Korsakoff's syndrome, introduced paranoia concept
- Aleksei Kozhevnikov, neurologist and psychiatrist, described the epilepsia partialis continua
- Stanislav Kozlovsky, psychophysiologist, studied the neural mechanisms of visual memory and perception.

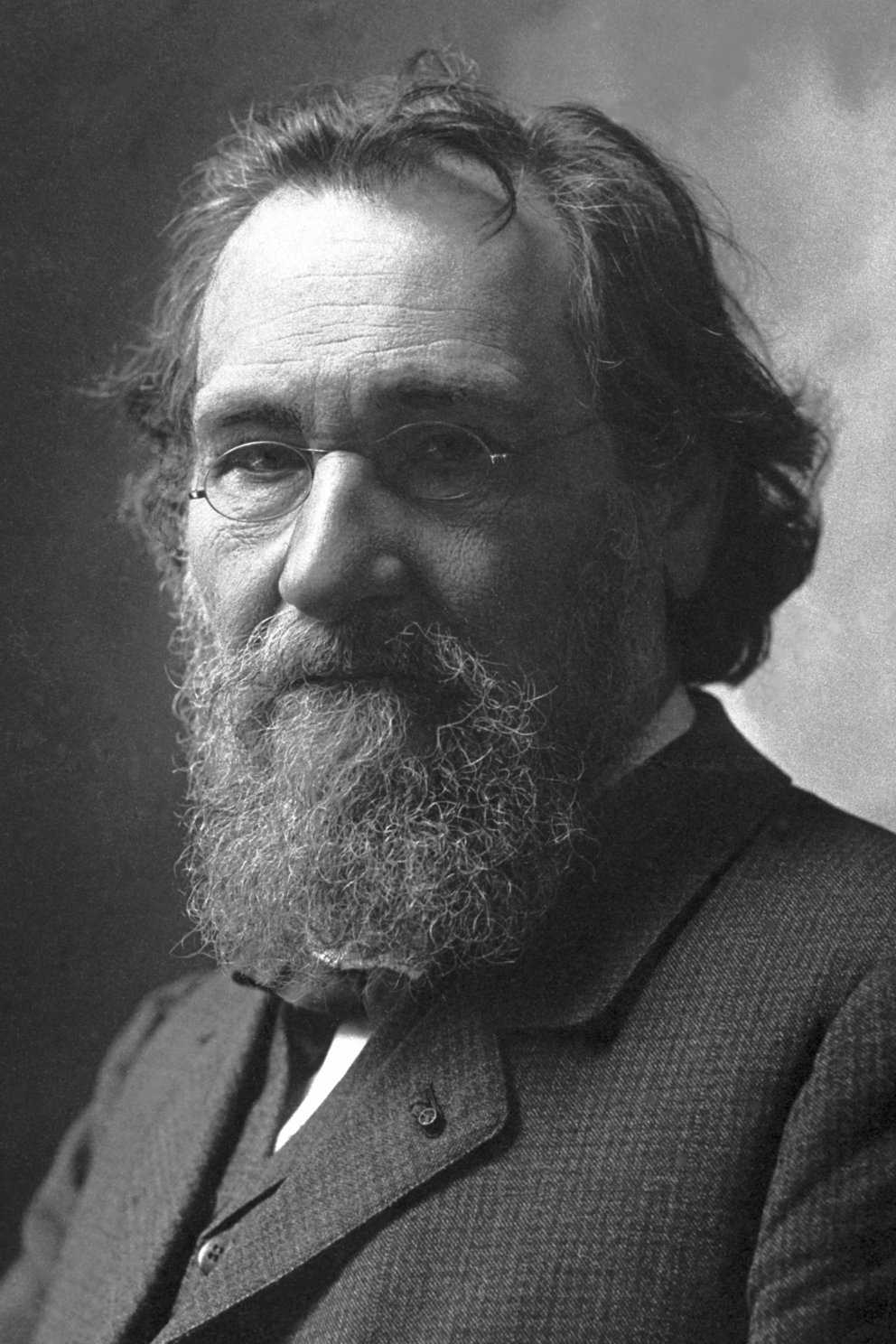
Mechnikov

=== L ===
- Aleksey Leontyev, founder of activity theory in psychology
- Peter Lesgaft, founder of the modern system of physical education in Russia
- Andrey Yevgenyevich Lichko, adolescent psychiatrist
- Alexander Luria, co-developer of activity theory and cultural-historical psychology, major researcher of aphasia

=== M ===
- Khalida Mamanova, professor, medical doctor, and participant of the Second World War.
- Ilya Mechnikov, pioneer researcher of immune system, probiotics and phagocytosis; coined the term "gerontology", Nobel Prize in Medicine winner
- Lazar Minor, neurologist, described Minor's disease

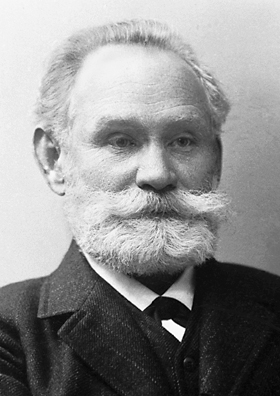
Pavlov

=== N ===
- Pyotr Nikolsky, dermatologist, discoverer of Nikolsky's sign
- Raissa Nitabuch, pathologist, the first to describe the spiral arteries which connect the uterine and placental blood flow during pregnancy.

=== O ===
- Alexey Olovnikov, predicted existence of telomerase, suggested the telomere hypothesis of aging and the telomere relations to cancer

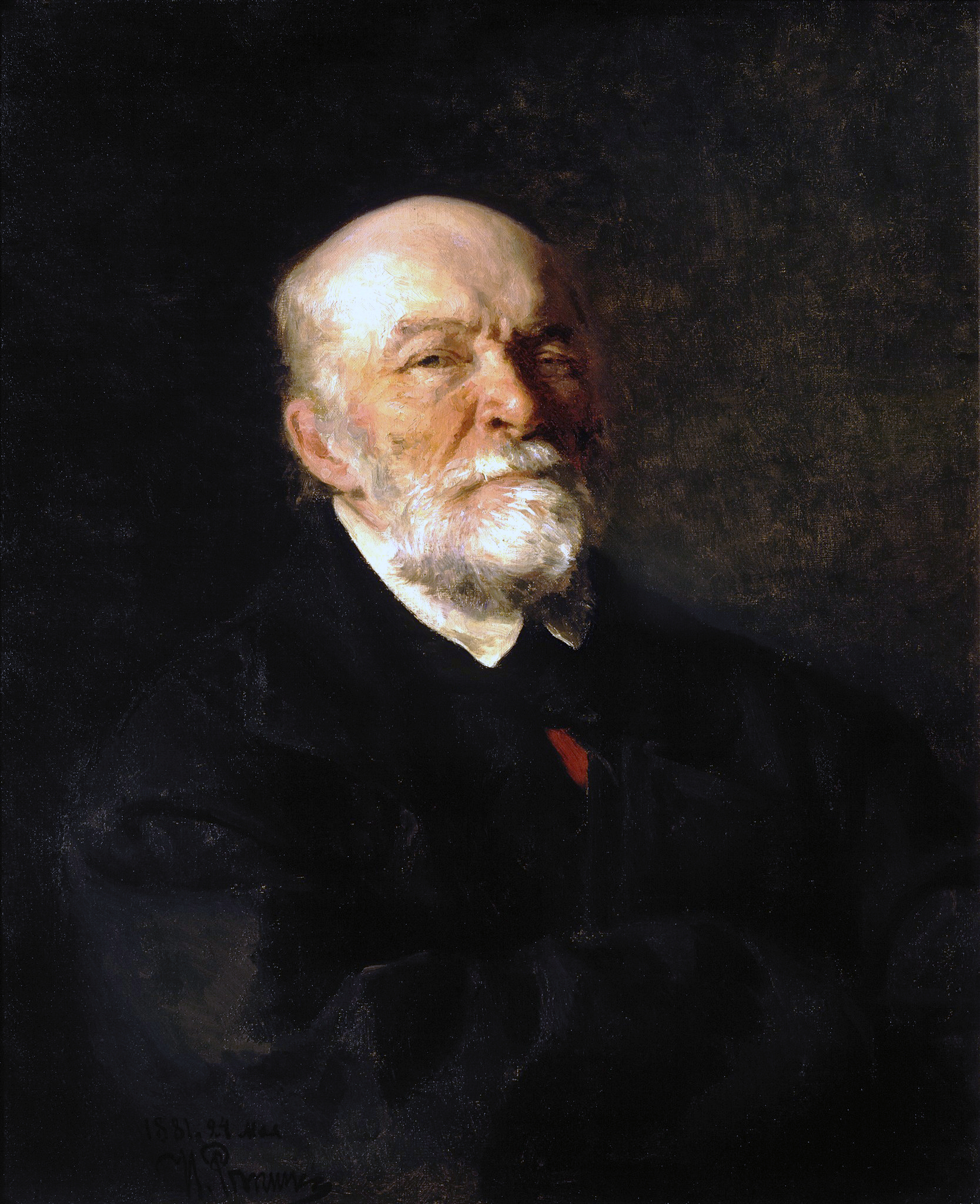
Pirogov

=== P ===
- Ivan Pavlov, founder of modern physiology, the first to research classical conditioning, influenced comparative psychology and behaviorism by his works on reflexes, Nobel Prize in Medicine winner
- Nikolay Pirogov, pioneer of ether anaesthesia and modern field surgery, the first to perform anaesthesia in the field conditions, invented a number of surgical operations
- Peter Herzen, Soviet surgeon and one of the pioneers of oncology in the USSR
- Viktor Protopopov, founder of his own pathophysiological school of thought, namesake of Protopopov's syndrome

=== R ===
- Leonid Rogozov, performed an appendectomy on himself during the 6th Soviet Antarctic Expedition, a famous case of self-surgery
- Grigory Rossolimo, pioneer of child neuropsychology
- Vladimir Roth, neuropathologist, described meralgia paraesthetica

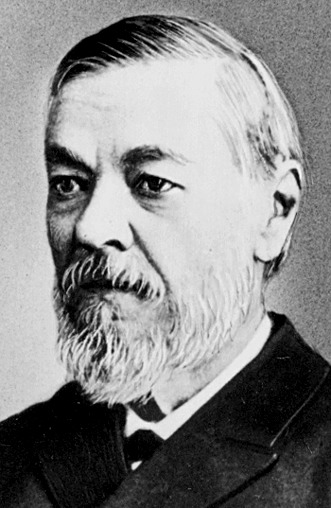
Sechenov

=== S ===
- Ivan Sechenov, founder of electrophysiology and neurophysiology, author of the classic work Reflexes of the Brain
- Vladimir Serbsky, founder of forensic psychiatry in Russia
- Nikolay Sklifosovskiy, prominent 19th-century field surgeon
- Victor Skumin, first to describe a previously unknown disease, now called Skumin syndrome (a disorder of the central nervous system of some patients after a prosthetic heart valve)
- Eugene Sokolov, founder the Soviet psychophysiology research. Known for his work on the orienting reflex and habituation.
- Lina Stern, pioneer researcher of blood–brain barrier

=== T ===
- George Tavartkiladze, audiologist and otorhinolaryngologist, founder and director of the National Research Centre for Audiology and Hearing Rehabilitation.

=== U ===
- Fyodor Uglov, oldest practicing surgeon in history
- Igor Ursov, phthisiatrist, the inventor of intravenous intermittent bactericidal tuberculosis therapy

=== V ===
- Alexander Varshavsky, researched ubiquitination, Wolf Prize in Medicine winner
- Vikenty Veresayev, Russian/Soviet doctor, author of Memoirs of a Physician
- Luka Voyno-Yasenetsky, founder of purulent surgery, saint
- Lev Vygotsky, founder of cultural-historical psychology, major contributor to child development and psycholinguistics, introduced zone of proximal development and cultural mediation concepts

=== W ===
- Josias Weitbrecht, first to describe the construction and function of intervertebral discs

=== Y ===
- Sergei Yudin, inventor of cadaveric blood transfusion

=== Z ===
- Alexander Zaporozhets, developmental psychologist, collaborator of Vygotsky, Luria, and Leontiev, once head of the Kharkov School of Psychology
- Bluma Zeigarnik, psychiatrist, discovered the Zeigarnik effect, founded experimental psychopathology

== See also ==
- List of physicians
- Psychiatry in the Soviet Union
- List of Russian scientists
- List of Russian inventors
- Science and technology in Russia
