= Rossolimo =

Rossolimo is a Greek last name. According to researches of Alexander N. Rossolimo, the name is widely used on the Ionian Islands and especially Kefalonia. It originates from the French baron or general Hugues de Sully who was in the service of Charles I of Naples. His red hair got de Sully the nickname Hugues le Rousseau that was mixed from Rousseau and Sully to the name Rossolimo.

== Notable people ==
- Grigory Ivanovich Rossolimo (1860–1928), Russian neurologist
- Nicolas Rossolimo (1910–1975), French and US chess player

== See also ==
- Rossolimo's sign
- Rossolimo variation in the Sicilian Defence, a chess opening.

== Sources ==
- Alain Pallier: Nicolas Rossolimo (28ii1910 – 24vii1975). In: eg 180, April 2010. Page 120, note 1
- Albert Failler: Revue des études Byzantines, Année 1993, Volume 51, Numéro 1, pages 317 - 319
