= S. M. Kirov Military Medical Academy =

School of military medicine in Saint Petersburg, Russia

- Военно-медицинская академия имени С. М. Кирова
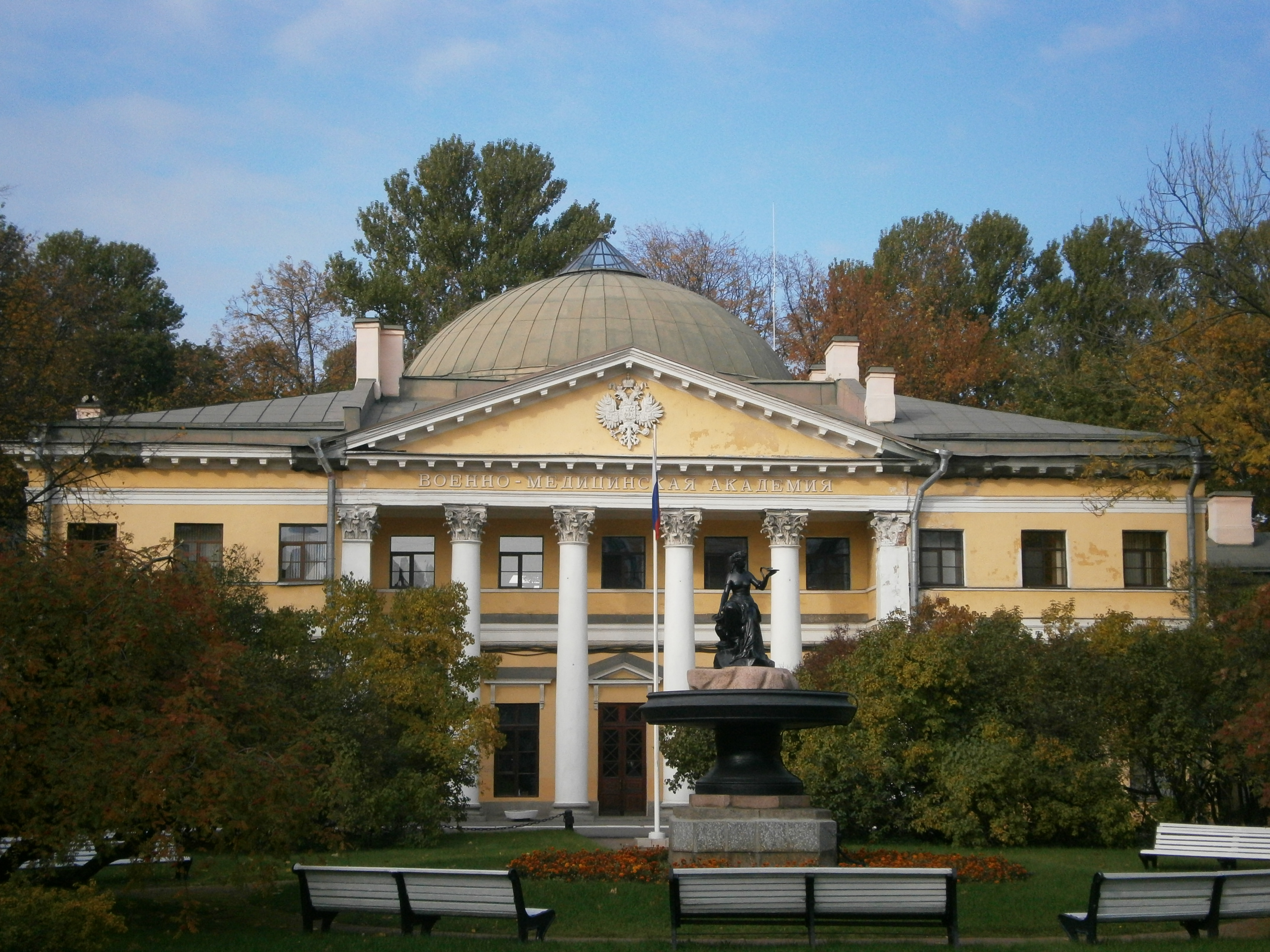
- Type: Public
- Established: 1715 (311 years ago)
- Location: Moscow, Russia; 59.957222°N 30.350833°E
- Website: www.vmeda.org

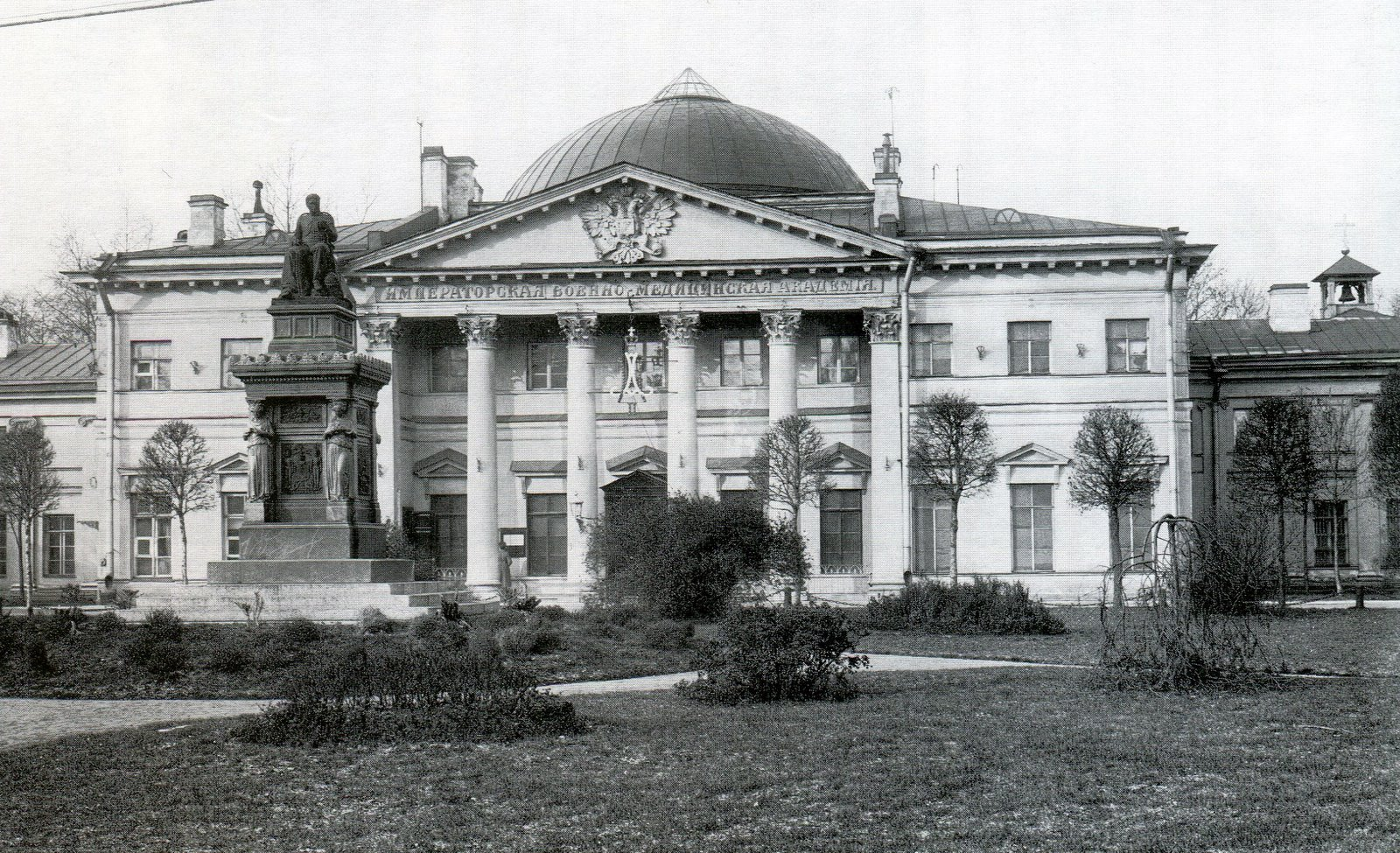
The Imperial Military Medical Academy in 1914 (as photographed by Karl Bulla)

The S. M. Kirov Military Medical Academy (Russian: Военно-медицинская академия имени С. М. Кирова, romanized: Voyenno-meditsinskaya akademiya imeni S. M. Kirova) is a higher education institution of military medicine in Saint Petersburg and the Russian Federation. Senior medical staff are trained for the Russian Armed Forces and conduct research in military medical services.

== History ==
=== Origins ===
The origins of the academy go back to the years of Peter the Great. In 1715, by the Tsar's order the Admiralty Hospital in the Vyborg Side of Saint Petersburg was founded. In 1717 next to it the Land Military Hospital was opened. Since 1773 surgical schools attached to both hospitals were operating. In 1786, those schools were consolidated into the Main Medical College. It became the principal training center for army and fleet physicians.

=== Imperial Medical and Surgical Academy ===
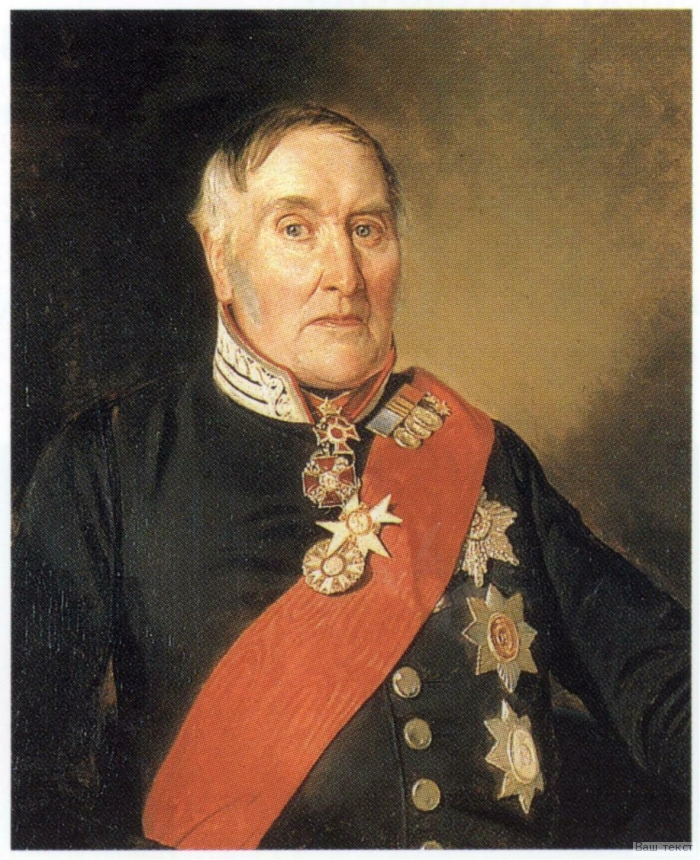
Sir James Wylie Bt

Unofficially, the year 1714 is considered the foundation year of the academy. The Medical and Surgical Academy was established by the order of Emperor Paul I of 18/29 December 1798 on the initiative of Baron Alexei Vasilyev (ru), General Director of the Medical College. It was decorated with a set of panel paintings by Giuseppe Bernasconi.

It was known as the Imperial Medical and Surgical Academy from 1808. According to the order of Emperor Alexander I, a member of the Medical and Surgical Academy had the rights, liabilities, and benefits of a member of the Academy of Sciences.

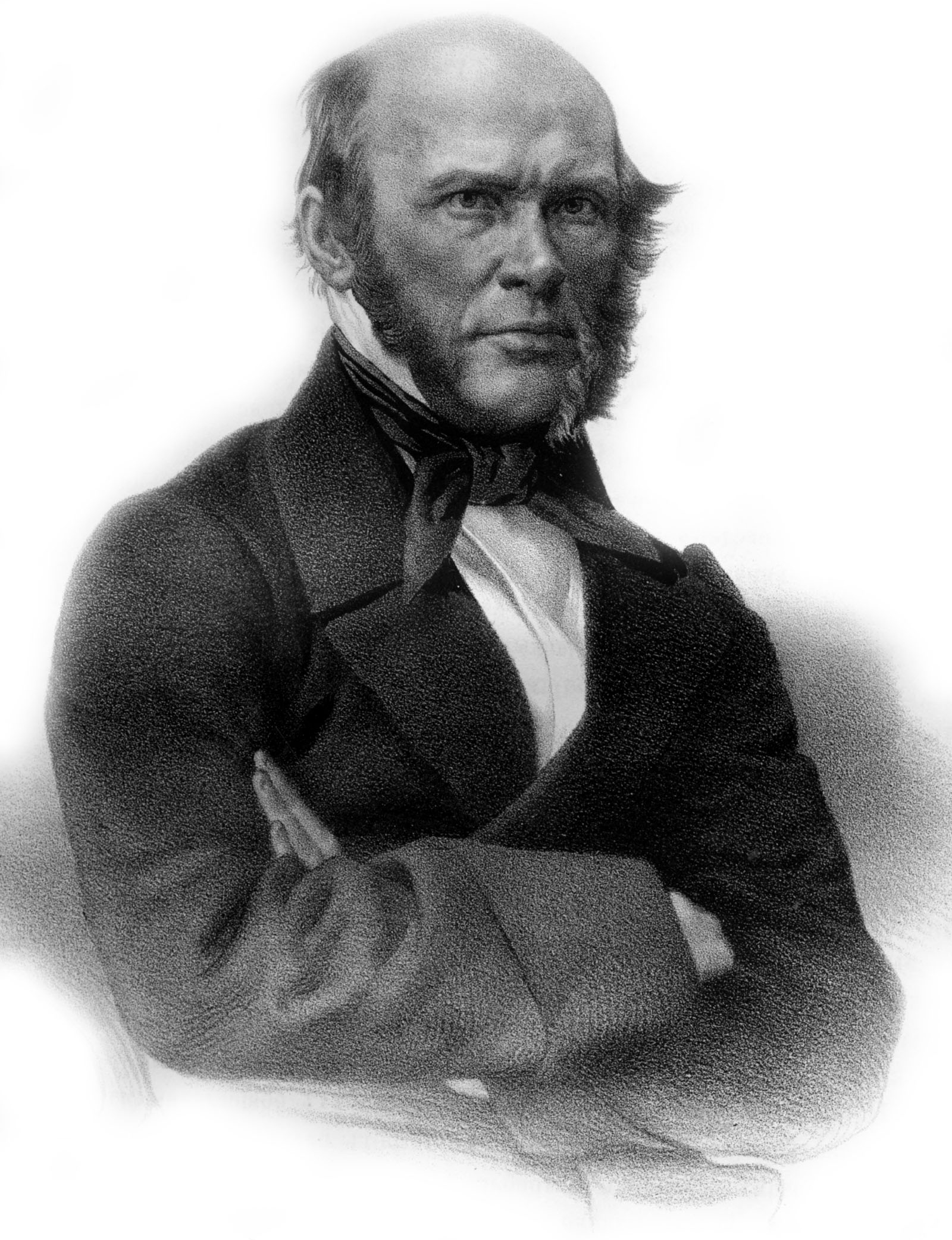
Nikolay Pirogov

Sir James Wylie, a Scottish baronet, managed the academy between 1808 and 1838. His contributions have been commemorated with a monument which stood in front of the academy until the October Revolution. It was later relocated and replaced with a statue of Hygieia.

=== Imperial Military Medical Academy ===
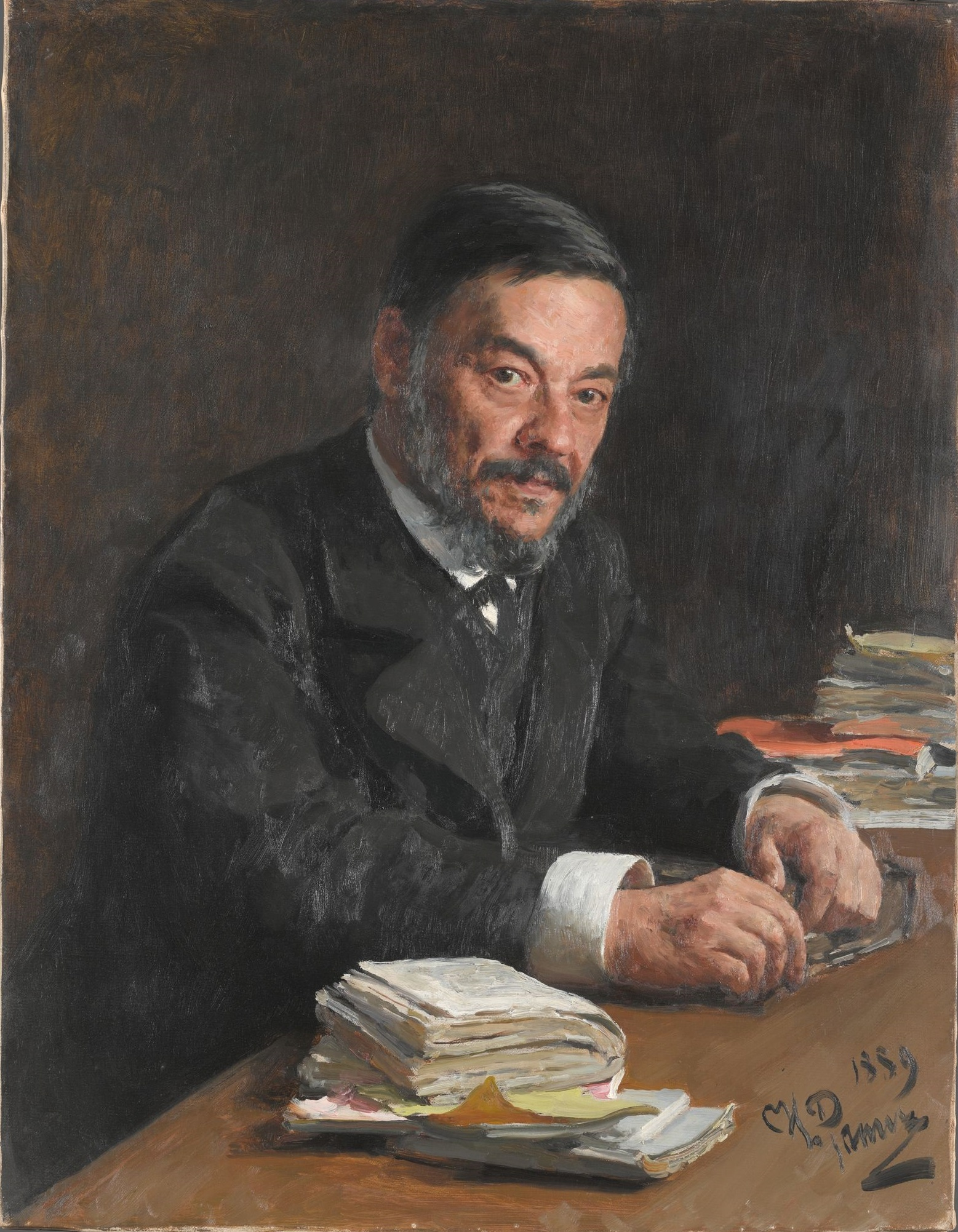
Ivan Sechenov

In 1881, the academy's official name was changed into the Imperial Military Medical Academy. Ivan Romanovich Tarkhanov conducted some experiments there. In 1890–1901, the academy's president was Viktor Pashutin, one of the founders of the pathophysiologic school in Russia and of pathophysiology as an independent scientific discipline. The Nobel-prize winning physiologist Ivan Pavlov graduated from the academy in 1879. Since 1895 he headed Department of Physiology at the academy for three decades.

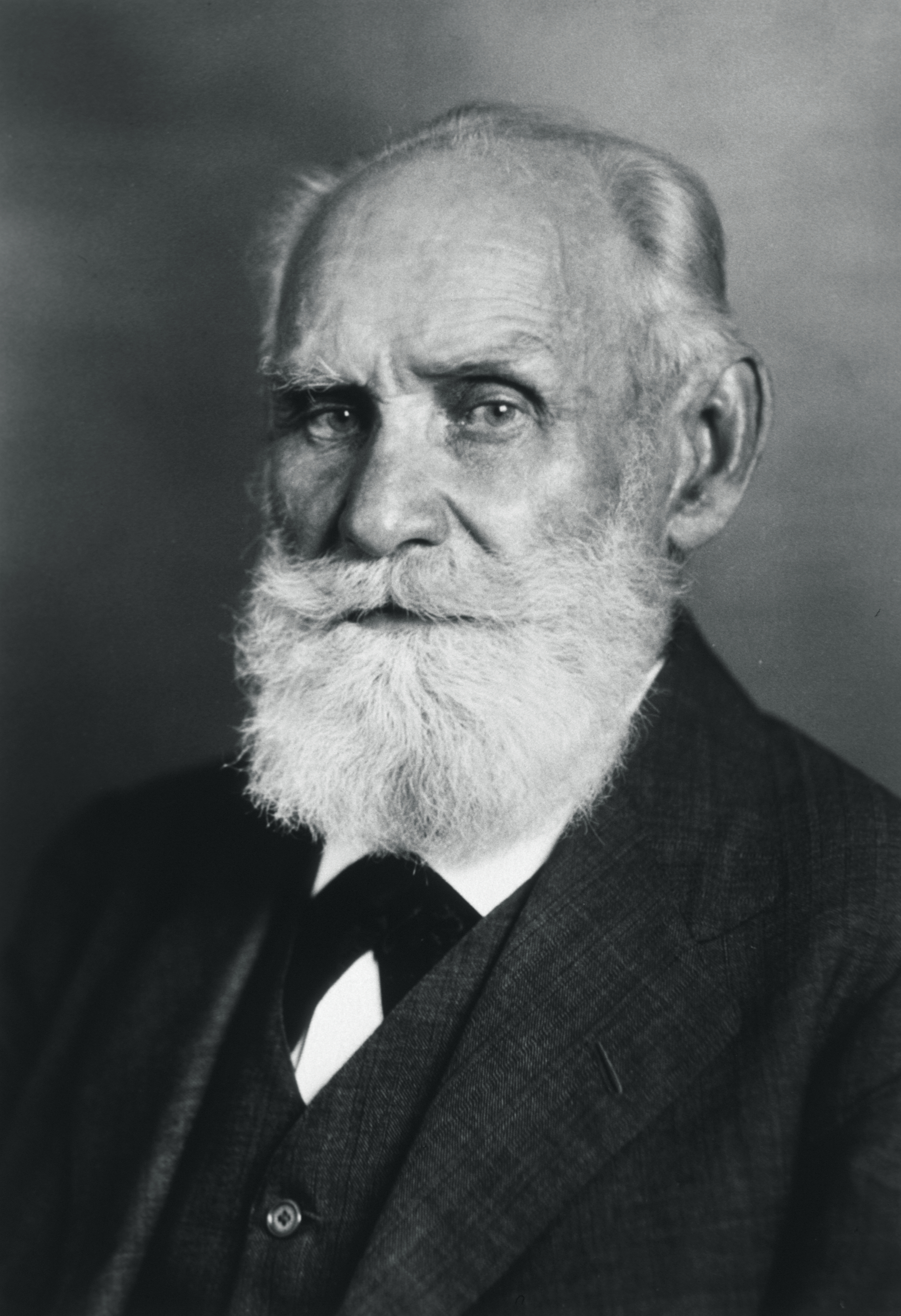
Ivan Pavlov

In 1904–1924, Nikolai Kravkov, the founder of Russian national school of pharmacologists, headed the academy's Department of Pharmacology. In 1903–1936, one of the academy's professors was Sergey Fedorov.

The academy was also among the pioneers of medical education for women, launching the courses for nurse-midwives in 1872. Nadezhda Suslova, the first female physician in Russia, attended Sechenov's classes at the academy.

=== S.M. Kirov Military Medical Academy ===
After Sergey Kirov's assassination in 1934, the academy received his name. Leon Orbeli, one of Pavlov's disciples, led the academy in 1943–1950. In 1956, S. M. Kirov Military Medical Academy was united with the Naval Medical Academy established on the basis of Obukhovskaya Hospital and the Third Leningrad Medical Institute in 1940. The academy had six faculties, 61 departments, 30 clinics, 16 research laboratories, and two research centres in 2002.

Late in 2011, minister of defense Anatoliy Serdyukov declared his intention to move the academy from the centre of Saint Petersburg to one of its suburbs. This decision was overturned after Serdyukov had been sacked.

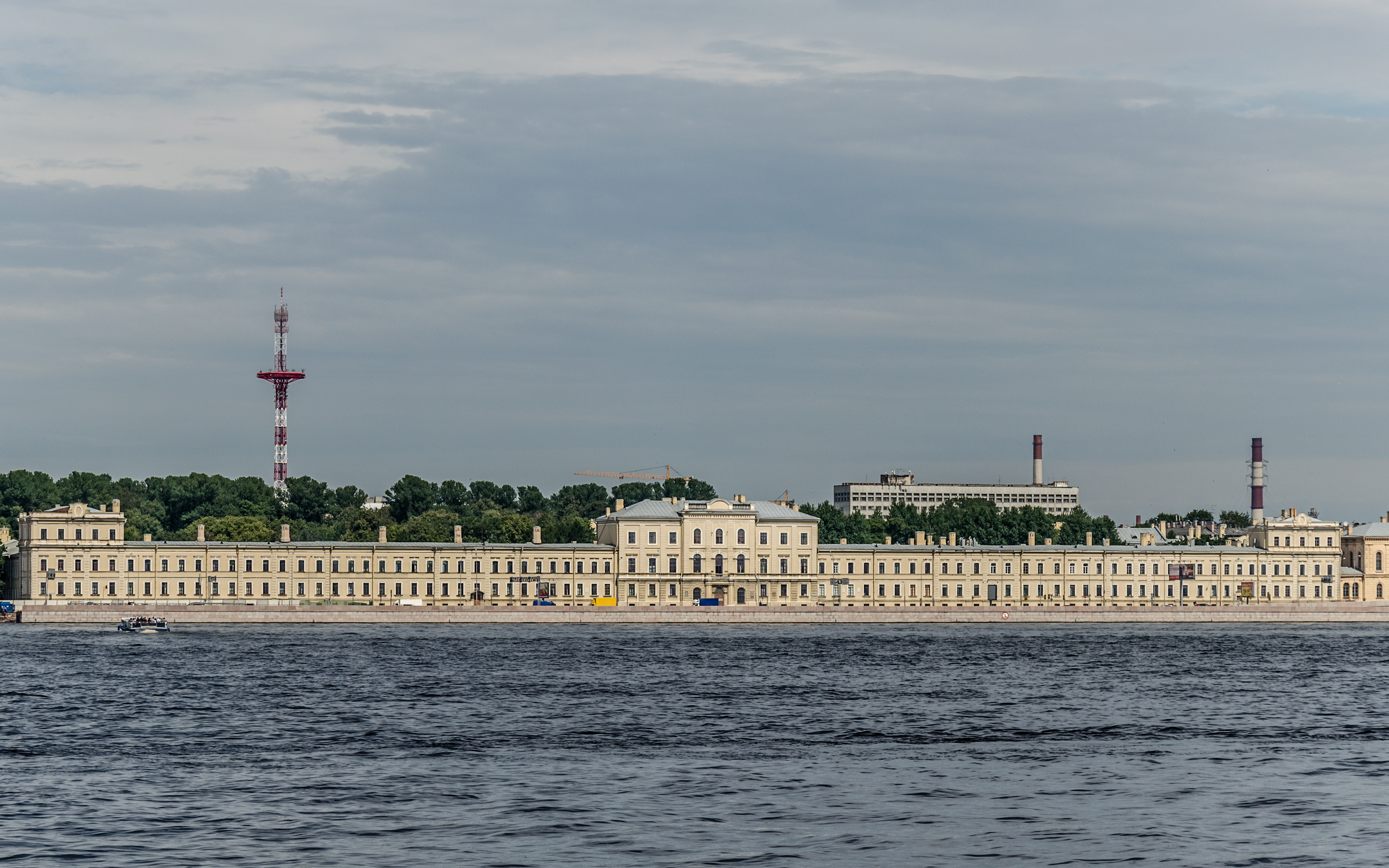
The campus on the bank of the Neva River

Graduates are commissioned as officers with medical doctor credentials.

== Structure ==
The academy has the following faculties:

- Faculty of Management
- Faculty of Training of Doctors (for the Strategic Missile Forces and Russian Ground Forces)
- Faculty of Physician Training (for Russian Aerospace Forces)
- Faculty of Physician Training (for the Russian Navy)
- Faculty of the Training of Foreign Doctors
- Faculty of Training of Professional Doctors
- Faculty of Training for Civilian Specialists
- Faculty of Secondary Vocational Education

The shoulder patch of the academy.

The educational bases of the branch are:

- Educational and laboratory building
- Main Military Clinical Hospital named after N. N. Burdenko
- Branch of the hospital
- 3rd Central Exhibition Hall
  - Branch No. 1
  - Branch No. 2
  - Branch No. 6
- 2nd Central Military Hospital named after P. Mandryka
- Treatment and Rehabilitation Clinical Center
- 9th Diagnostic and Treatment Center
- Moscow Regional Ambulance Station

Since 1 September 2015, it has been working as a branch of the Institute for the Advancement of Doctors of the Ministry of Defense. 63 departments (28 military, 35 civilian), of which 31 are clinical, 17 are surgical, and 14 are therapeutic.

=== Support units ===
There are three support units

- Base – The academy's clinical base has a staff capacity of 2,616 beds and is represented by 16 surgical clinics (including 7 general and 9 specialized clinics).
- Editorial office – Since November 4, 1958, the academy has been publishing the large-circulation newspaper Military Doctor, since 1999 the quarterly journal Vestnik of the Russian Military Medical Academy, and since 2016, Izvestia of the Russian Military Medical Academy.
- Military Band – The band of the Military Medical Academy is the official marching band of the academy. The band took part in many celebrations held by the administrations of the city of St. Petersburg and the Leningrad Oblast. In the Soviet era, the band won multiple prizes during the All-Union Competition. It is an annual participant in the Victory Day Parade on 9 May, a parade in honor of the lifting of the Siege of Leningrad, as well as the celebrations of the Day of the city, Paratroopers' Day and Alexander Nevsky Day. Musicians of the band have notably participated in the filming of historical films and military-historical reconstructions. In 2019, the band, led by conductor Lieutenant Cololonel Mikhail Nikolaev, participated in the Spasskaya Tower Military Music Festival and Tattoo on Red Square.

In 2016, 11 territorial retraining and advanced training courses for paramedical personnel were opened in Vladivostok, Chita, Novosibirsk, Yekaterinburg, Samara, Rostov-on-Don, Sevastopol, Kaliningrad, Severomorsk, Podolsk and Moscow.

== Notable alumni ==
- Nikolay Anichkov (1885–1964)
- Boris Babkin (1877–1950)
- Vladimir Bekhterev (1857–1927)
- Peter Borovsky (1863–1932)
- Eugene Botkin (1865–1918)
- Alexey Bystrow (1899–1959)
- Napoleon Cybulski (1854–1919)
- Nikolay Gamaleya (1859–1949)
- Ilya Gruzinov (1781–1813)
- Alexander Dianin (1851–1918)
- Alexander Dubrovin (1855–1921)
- Boris Karvasarsky (1931–2013)
- Oleg Kotov
- Nikolai Kravkov (1865–1924)
- Vasily Kravkov (1859–1920)
- Nikolai Kulbin (1868–1917)
- Nikolai Kurochkin (1830–1884)
- Peter Lesgaft (1837–1909)
- Artur Lossmann (1877–1972)
- Alexander Maximow (1874–1928)
- Mamia Orakhelashvili (1881–1937)
- Leon Orbeli (1882–1958)
- Viktor Pashutin (1845–1901)
- Yevgeny Pavlovsky (1884–1965)
- Victor Protopopov (1880–1957)
- Yuri Senkevich (1937–2003)
- Christian von Steven (1781–1863)
- Pauls Stradiņš (1896–1958)
- Ivan Tarkhanov (1846–1908)
- Andrei Tolubeyev (1945–2008)
- Alexander Vinogradov (1895–1975)
- Vasily Vorontsov (1847–1918)
- Konrad Wagner (1862–1948)
- Jakub Wygodzki (1856–1941)

== See also ==
- Russian Museum of Military Medicine
- Military academies in Russia
