= Bekh =

Bekh may refer to:

== Places ==
- Bekh, former name for the village Khordzor in Armenia

== People ==
- Ivan Bekh (born 1940), Ukrainian professor
- Maryna Bekh (born 1995), Ukrainian long jumper
