= Viktor Pashutin =

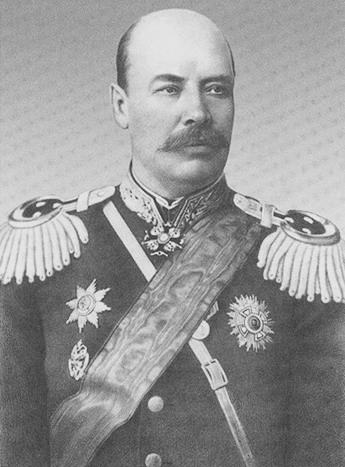
- Born: Viktor Vasilyevich Pashutin; 28 January 1845; Novocherkassk, Russian Empire
- Died: 2 February 1901 (aged 56); Saint Petersburg, Russian Empire
- Education: Imperial Medical and Surgical Academy
- Known for: one of the founders of the pathophysiologic school in Russia and of pathophysiology as an independent scientific discipline.
- Awards: Order of Saint Stanislaus 2nd Class; Order of St. Anna 1st Class; Order of Saint Vladimir 3rd Class; Order of Prince Danilo I 1st Class
- Scientific career
- Fields: pathophysiology

Viktor Vasilyevich Pashutin (Russian: Ви́ктор Васи́льевич Пашу́тин) was a Russian pathophysiologist, one of the founders of the pathophysiologic school in Russia and of pathophysiology as an independent scientific discipline. From 1890 to 1901 he headed the Imperial Military Medical Academy in Saint Petersburg and was its Full Member (1890).

== Biography ==
Pashutin was born on 28 January 1845 in Novocherkassk, Don Host Oblast. Till 1862 he studied at the Voronezh Theological Seminary. In the same year he was admitted to the Imperial Medical and Surgical Academy, where he became one of Ivan Sechenov's disciples. Graduated in 1868, he was left at the academy to be prepared for the professor's rank. In 1870 Viktor Pashutin was awarded with the degree of Doctor of Medicine for the thesis titled "Some experiments on the enzymes that turn starch into glucose and cane sugar". In 1871 he became assistant professor of physiology.

The years from 1871 to 1874, Viktor Pashutin spent in practical trainings in different German universities. In Leipzig he practiced physiology under the guidance of Professor Carl Ludwig and medicinal chemistry with Professor Karl Hugo Huppert. He also attended the lectures of Friedrich von Recklinghausen on general pathology and of Felix Hoppe-Seyler on medicinal chemistry in Strasbourg.

From 1874 to 1879 Professor Pashutin headed the Department of General Pathology of the Imperial Kazan University, where he founded Russia's first laboratory of experimental pathology. Since 1879 he headed the newly established Department of General and Experimental Pathology of the Imperial Military Medical Academy in Saint Petersburg, moulded by him into a center of national pathophysiologic school.

From 1890 to 1901 Professor Pashutin served as head of the Imperial Military Medical Academy in Saint Petersburg. He was elected its Full Member in 1890. Since 1889, Professor Pashutin also was a chairman of the Medical Council of the Imperial Ministry of Internal Affairs. In 1892 he was promoted to the rank of Privy Councilor (III grade of the Table of Ranks).

Viktor Vasilyevich Pashutin died on 2 February 1901 in Saint Petersburg.

== Scientific activity ==
Professor Pashutin's principal works are dedicated to disturbances of metabolism and thermoregulation, oxygen starvation and vitamin deficiency. He created an important scientific school, among whose adherents were Pyotr Albitsky, Stepan Kostyurin, Nikolai Kravkov, Sergey Lukyanov, Alexander Reprev, Nikolai Ushinsky and others.

== Selected bibliography ==
- (in Russian) V.V. Pashutin, Some experiments on the enzymes that turn starch into glucose and cane sugar (Y. Trey's Typography, Saint Petersburg, 1870)
- (in Russian) V.V. Pashutin, Lectures in general pathology (pathological physiology), in two parts (University Press, Kazan, 1878–1881)
- (in Russian) V.V. Pashutin, Course of General and Experimental Pathology, in two volumes (N.A. Lebedev's Typography, Staint Petersburg, 1885–1902)
- (in Russian) V.V. Pashutin, Selected Works (Moscow, 1952)
