= Aleksei Kozhevnikov =

Russian neurologist and psychiatrist

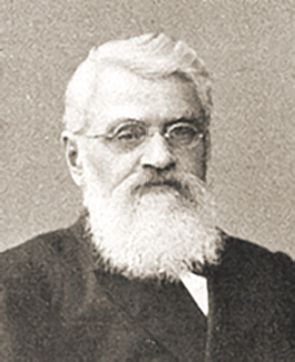
Aleksei Kozhevnikov

Aleksei Yakovlevich Kozhevnikov (Russian: Алексе́й Я́ковлевич Коже́вников; 5 March 1836 - 23 October 1902) was a Russian neurologist and psychiatrist who was a native of Ryazan.

== Biography ==
From 1853 until 1858 he studied medicine at the University of Moscow, and furthered his education in Germany, Switzerland, England and France. At Jean Martin Charcot's laboratory in Paris he made important pathological correlations in the study of amyotrophic lateral sclerosis (ALS). In 1869 he returned to Moscow, where he worked at the Novo-Ekaterininskii Hospital, and gave classes in neurologic and psychiatric diseases. From 1870 to 1884 he was in charge of the clinic for neurologic diseases, becoming professor extraordinarius in 1873.

In 1880 Kozhevnikov attained the chair of special pathology and therapy at the University of Moscow, and in 1886 founded the university clinic of psychiatry. In 1890 he founded the Moscow Society of Neuropathologists and Psychiatrists. In 1901 he founded the Korsakov Journal of Neurology and Psychiatry.

== Career ==
Kozhevnikov was a pioneer of Russian psychiatry, and was an advocate for humane treatment of the mentally insane. His name is lent to the eponymous "Kozhevnikov's epilepsy", also known as epilepsia continua, which is an epilepsy characterized by almost continuous, rhythmic muscular contractions that affect a limited portion of the body. He provided a comprehensive description of progressive familial spastic diplegia, and made contributions in the neuropathological study of nuclear ophthalmoplegia and asthenic bulbar paralysis.

Among his students and assistants were Sergei Korsakoff (1853–1900), Grigory Ivanovich Rossolimo (1860–1928), Liverij Osipovich Darkshevich (1858–1925), Vladimir Karlovich Roth (1848–1916), Lazar Salomonovich Minor (1855–1942) and Edward Flatau (1869–1932).
