= Russian Museum of Military Medicine =

Museum in Saint Petersburg, Russia

Coordinates: 59.921°N 30.3265°E

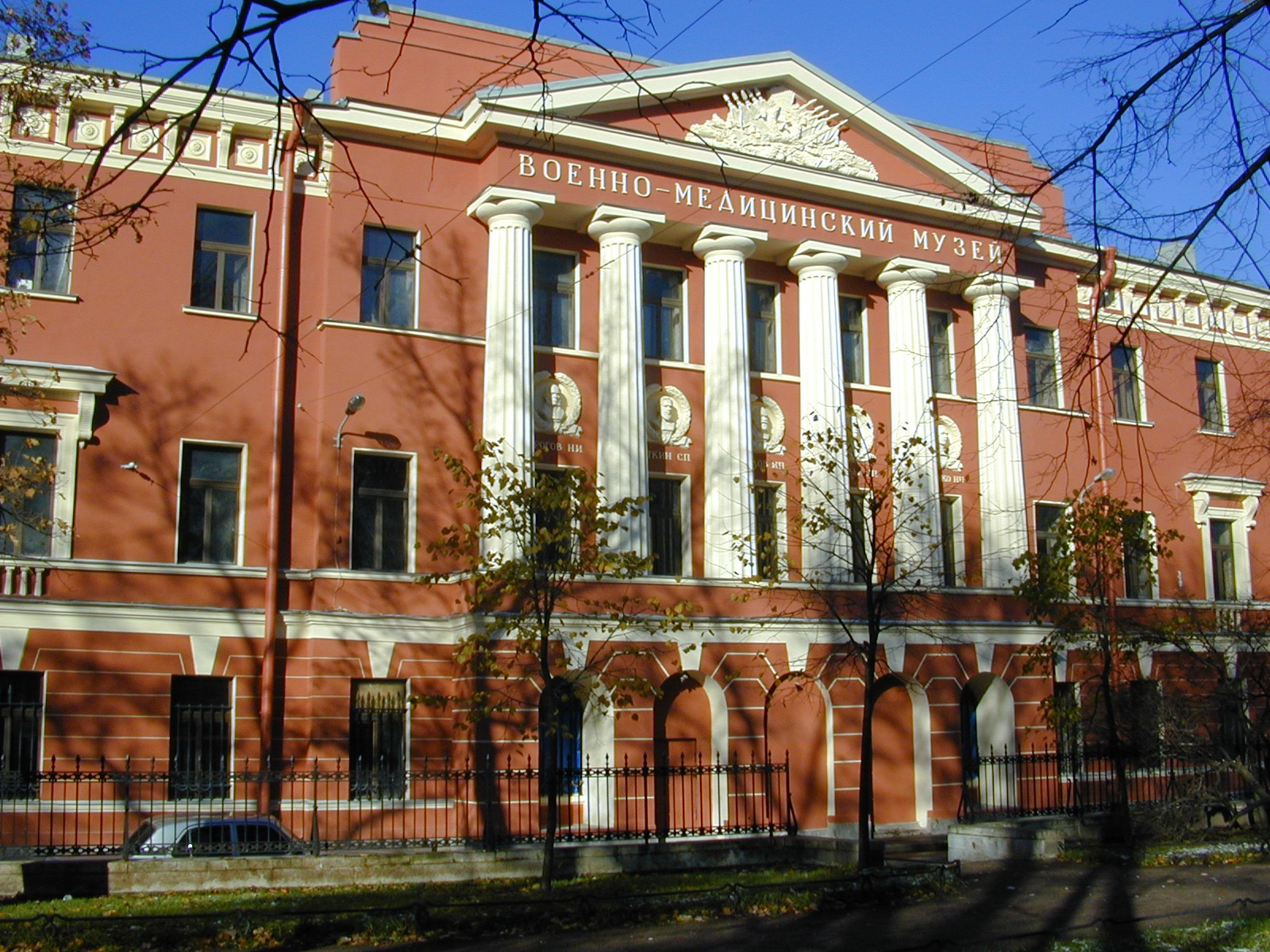
The main building of the Military Medicine Museum, Saint Petersburg, Russia

The Russian Museum of Military Medicine (Russian: Военно-медицинский музей Министерства обороны Российской Федерации) is situated in the center of Saint Petersburg, Russia, in front of Vitebsky Rail Terminal.

== History ==
The Museum was founded in Moscow, RSFSR, in 1942, before being moved to Leningrad (now Saint Petersburg) three years later. Its initial creation was based on collections from several small specialized Russian museums. Today, the museum holds about 210,000 exhibits relating to the history of Russian and world military medicine.

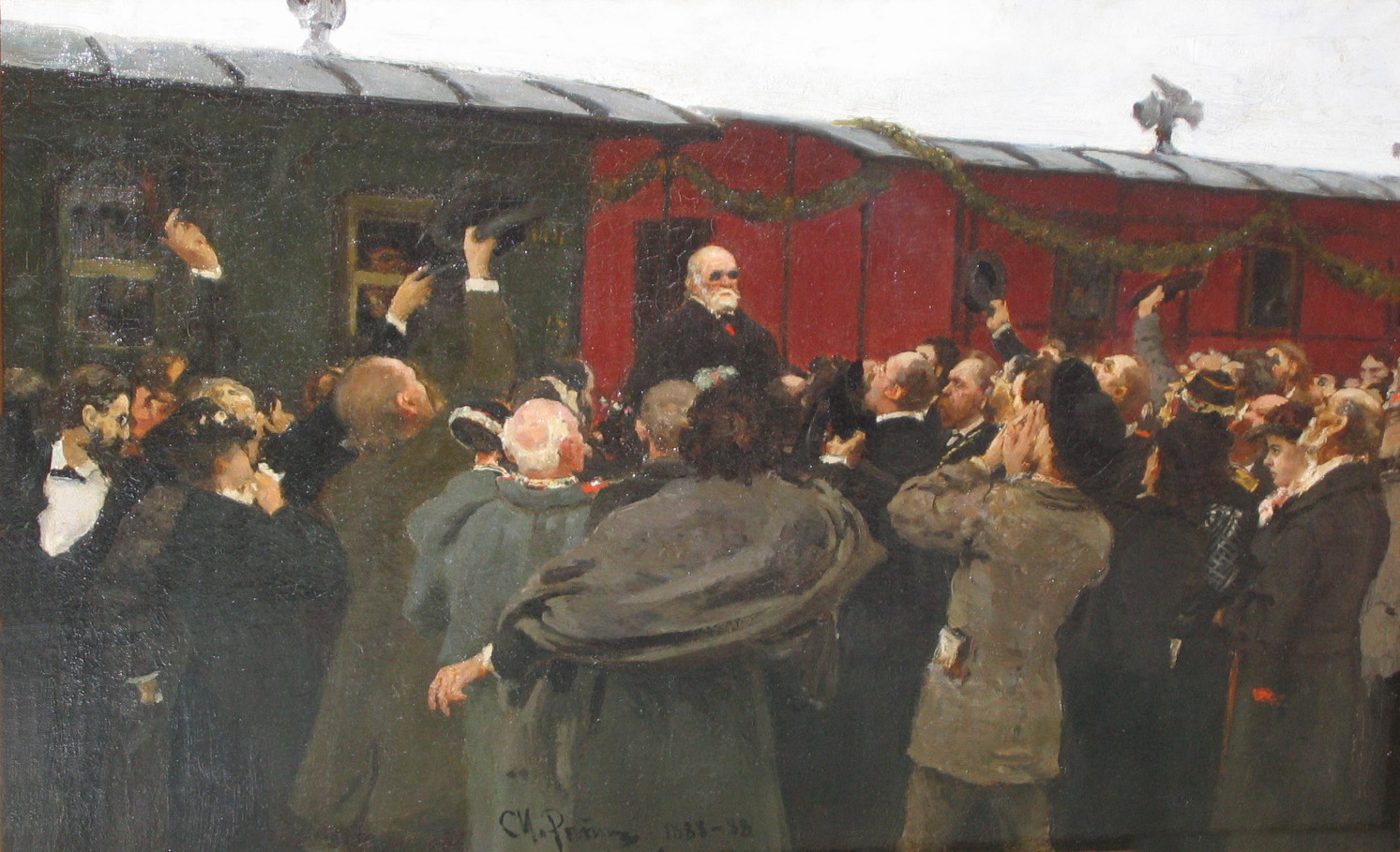
A sketch by the Ilya Efimovich Repin of The arrival of Nikolai Ivanovich Pirogov to Moscow celebrating the 50th anniversary of the scientific activities of the great Russian surgeon in 1881

Responding to inquiries from foreign governments, the museum located the documents of more than 100,000 people who were listed in their respective countries as missing in action.

Moreover, the history of medicine reveals an even more ominous trend, which is the tendency toward the progressive dehumanization of medicine itself. Two hundred years ago, during the French-Russian wars, military doctors impartially treated both their own soldiers and the soldiers of the enemy. The Russian military doctor, Christophor Oppel, was awarded for his service on the battlefield by both the Emperors Alexander I of Russia and Napoleon I of France at the same time! Now, 200 years later, at the beginning of the 21st century, military doctors participate in interrogation of the enemy with the intention of securing critical information with the aid of medicines. Furthermore, there exist some attempts to scientifically substantiate it, contending that the interests of the nation and government are superior to the interest of an individual (see e.g.).

== See also ==
- Kirov Military Medical Academy

== Literature ==
- Budko A.A., Bergman M.D. (Будко А.А., Бергман М.Д. ) The Fundamentals of the Conception of the Military Medicine Museum // The Military Medicine Journal (Voenno-Meditsinski Zhurnal - Военно-медицинский журнал, in Russian), 2007, Vol. 328, No 6 (June 2007), pp. 80 - 84.
- Budko A.A., Ivanova L.D. (Будко А.А., Иванова Л.Д.) The Military Medicine Museum is the Principal Guardian of the Historical Traditions of the Russian Medicine and Its Military Medical Service // Asclepius (Асклепий, in Russian), 2005, Vol. 8, No 1, pp. 46 - 57.
