= Nikolai Kulbin =

Russian composer

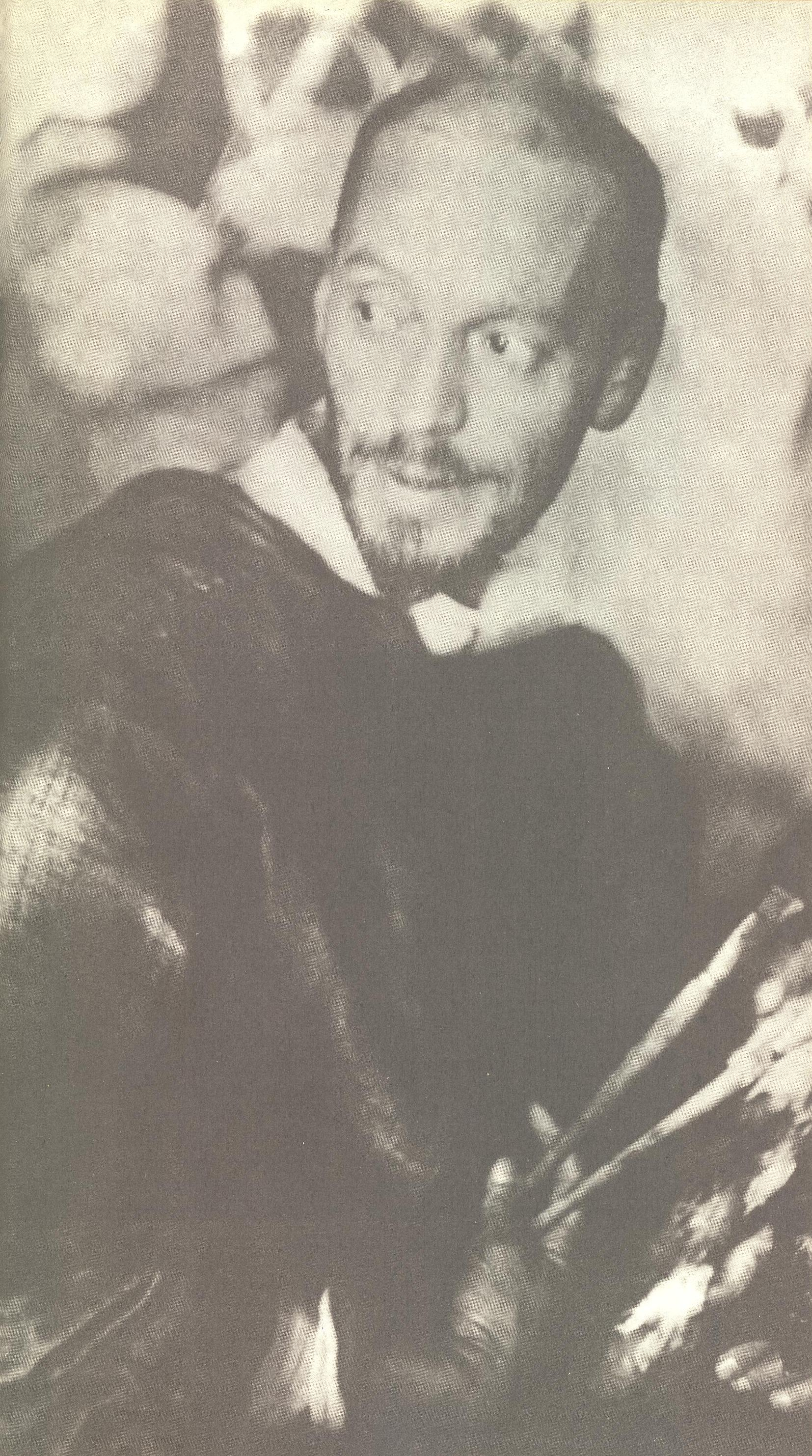
Kulbin in 1909

Nikolai Ivanovich Kulbin (Russian: Николай Иванович Кульбин; 1868, Helsinki – 6 March 1917, Petrograd) was a Russian Futurist artist, musician and theorist.

Kulbin first trained as medical doctor at the Imperial Military Medical Institute, graduating in 1893. He then became a lecturer at the Military Medical Attendants' School while also researching alcoholism.

He became an active artist and set designer. From 1913 to 1914 gave lectures on Futurism.

== Main canvases ==
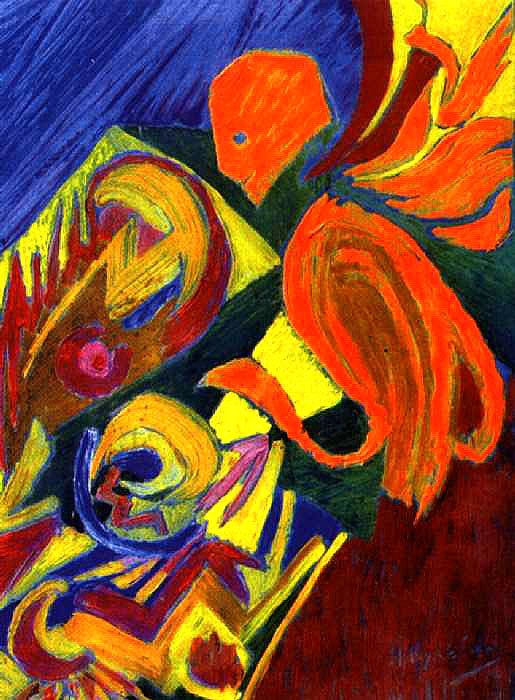
Painter, 1916

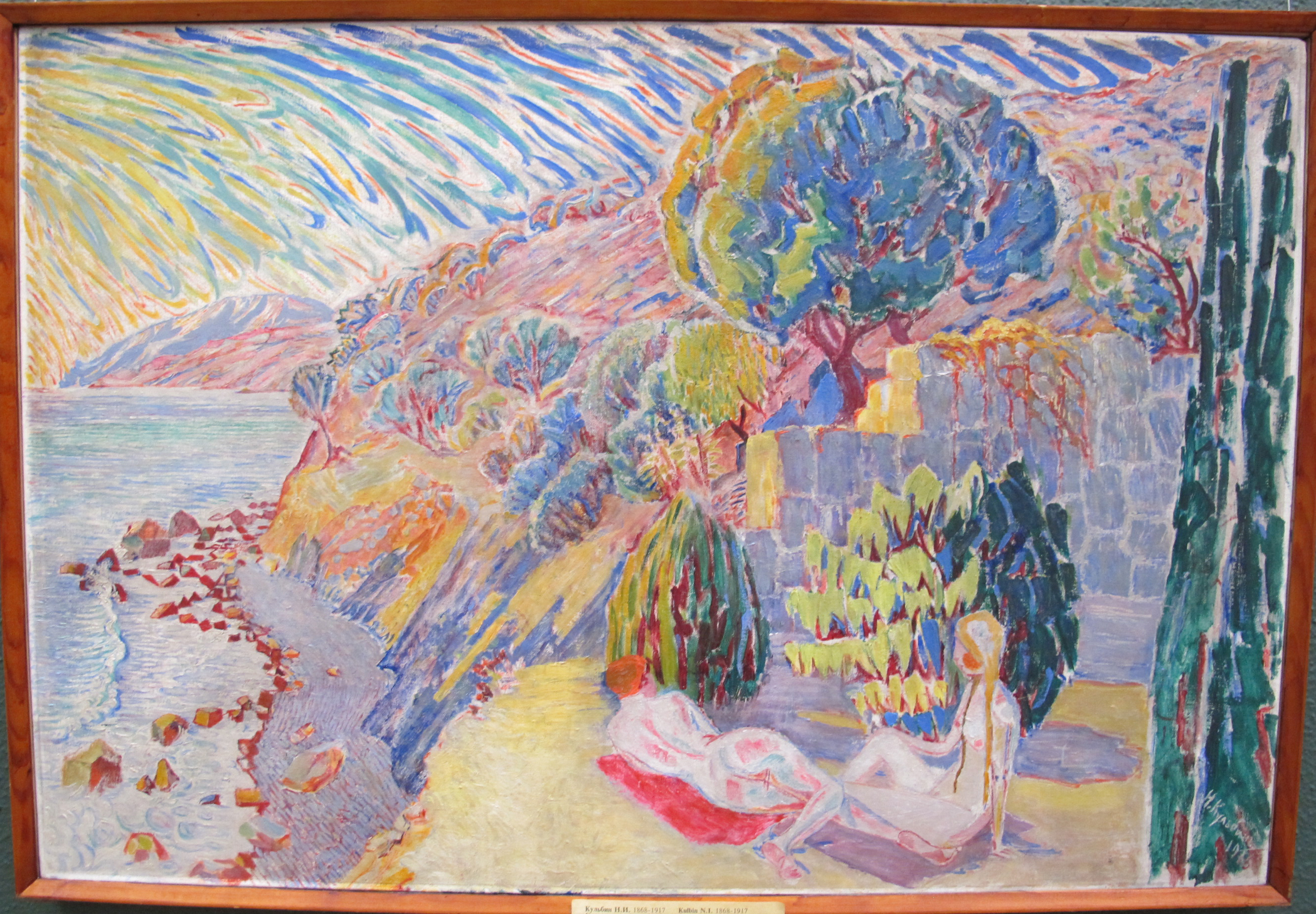
Taking the Sun, 1916

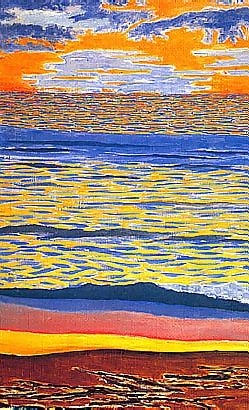
Sea View
