= Korsakov Journal of Neurology and Psychiatry =

Russian peer-reviewed Neurology and Psychiatry journal

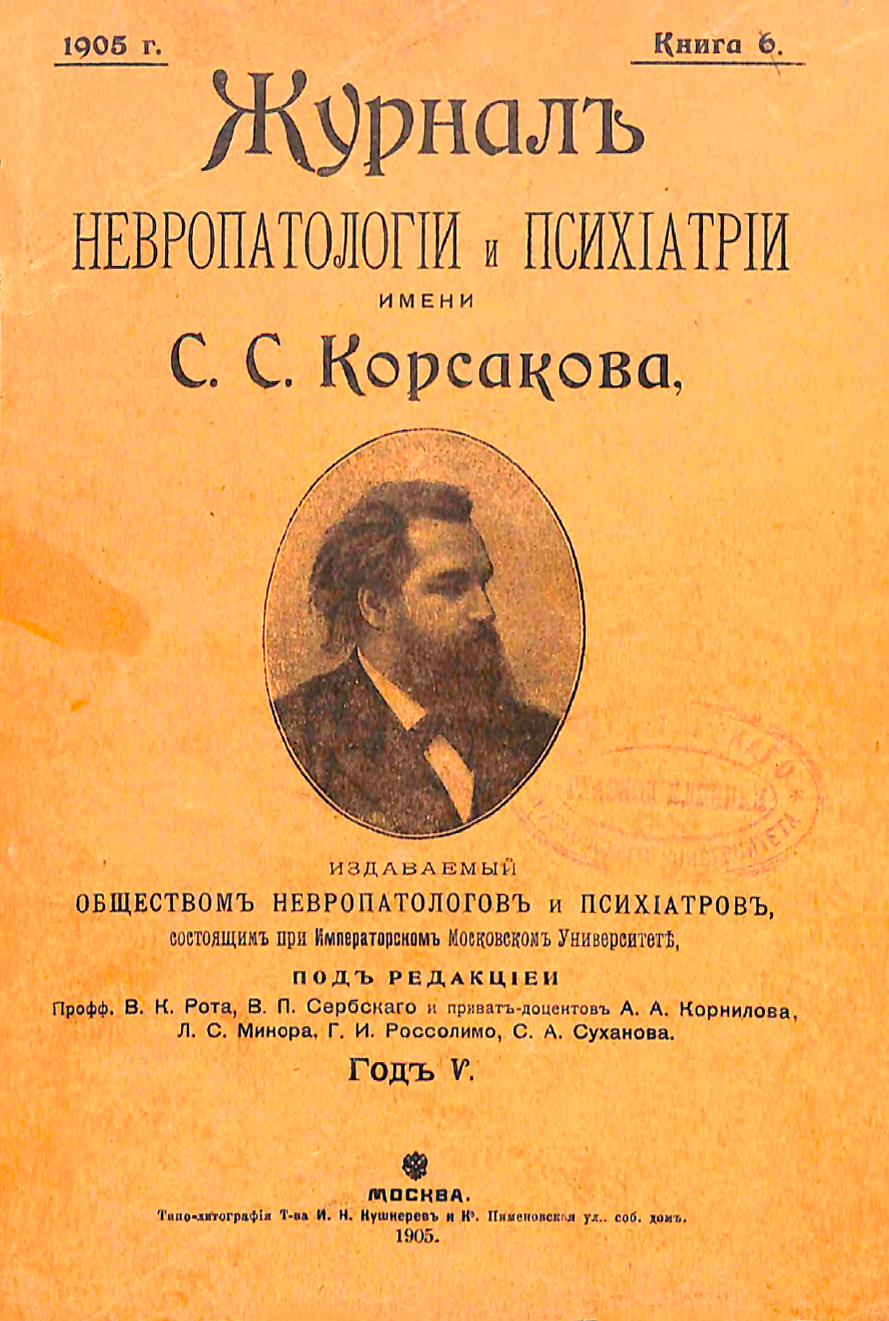
- Publisher: "Media Sphere"
- Founded: 1901
- Based in: Moscow
- Language: Russian
- Website: https://mediasphera.ru/journal/zhurnal-nevrologii-i-psikhiatrii-im-s-s-korsakova
- ISSN: 0044-4588

The Korsakov Journal of Neurology and Psychiatry (Russian: Журнал неврологии и психиатрии им. С. С. Корсакова, lit. 'Journal of Neurology and Psychiatry named after S. S. Korsakov') is a Russian peer-reviewed scientific and practical journal.

== Background ==
The magazine was founded in 1901 by Aleksei Kozhevnikov and named after the Russian psychiatrist Sergei Korsakov.

== Present-day ==
The journal is currently published by the Media Sphere publishing house with the assistance of the All-Russian Society of Neurologists and the Russian Society of Psychiatrists. The magazine's circulation is 4,000 copies. Twelve issues are published per year. It is one of the most authoritative publications in the field of neurology and psychiatry in Russian. The journal is published in Moscow.

Until 1993, it was called the "S. S. Korsakova Journal of Neuropathology and Psychiatry."

== Criticism ==
In 2001, the Korsakov Journal of Neurology and Psychiatry published an article by N.A. Zorin and A.V. Nemtsov from the Moscow Research Institute of Psychiatry of the Ministry of Health of the Russian Federation. The article claimed that only 15.1% of the articles reviewed in their publication from the Journal of Neurology and Psychiatry and 7.4% of the articles from another reputable Russian journal, Social and Clinical Psychiatry, met the criteria of scientific rigor and could be considered reliable. The authors noted that "the manner in which the material was presented (the lack of appropriate descriptions) did not allow for a judgment on their scientific validity (degree of evidence), and this automatically disqualified such works from being considered scientific, emphasizing the importance of adhering to formalities and demanding thoroughness from authors in presenting the essence of their work."

In their article, N.A. Zorin and A.V. Nemtsov pointed out that the editors of the journal bore some responsibility for the low scientific quality of the materials, as they did not work sufficiently with the authors. According to the conclusion drawn by N.A. Zorin and A.V. Nemtsov, based on an analysis of psychiatric articles conducted 10 years prior, the qualifications in this field had not changed at all during that period.
