= Ivan Bekh =

Ukrainian psychologist

Ivan Bekh (born October 9, 1940) is a professor who currently holds the position of Director of the Institute for Educational Problems. He was born in Vilchya, a village in the Polissya district of the Kiev Oblast province, and he is a respected member of the science and technology fields in Ukraine. Bekh is also a doctor of psychology (Doktor nauk) and an active member of the National Academy of Pedagogical Sciences of Ukraine.

== Education ==
Ivan Bekh graduated from the Faculty of Defectology, Pedagogics and Psychology at Ukraine's National Dragomanov Pedagogical University in 1964.

== Career ==
- 1970-1993 - I. Bekh began his scientific efforts in the Psychology Research Institute at Ministry of Education of the Ukrainian SSR, where he made his way from a junior researcher to a head of the research department.
- 1993-1996 - He was deputy head of the Institute of Defectology at National Academy of Pedagogical Sciences of Ukraine
- December 1996-now - He was the founder and the first Head of Institute of Problems on Education at the National Academy of Pedagogical Sciences of Ukraine

== Scientific activities ==
- 1992 - defended a thesis for receiving a psychology doctor's degree
- 1995 - was awarded a professor title
- since 1999 - an acting member of National Academy of Pedagogical Sciences of Ukraine
- 2002 - was awarded an Honored Worker of Science and Technology of Ukraine

He created a unique theory of person-oriented education, an original concept of rules-driven subject-subject interaction and an act concept.

Bekh is author of more than 460 scientific papers. He has 10 individual monographs, is co-author of 9 monographs and author of 17 tracts.
