= Rossolimo's sign =

- Differential diagnosis: Pyramidal tract lesions

Rossolimo's sign is a clinical sign in which percussion of the tips of the toes causes an exaggerated flexion of the toes. It is found in patients with pyramidal tract lesions, and is one of a number of Babinski-like responses. The sign is named after Grigory Ivanovich Rossolimo.
