= Viktor Protopopov =

Viktor Pavlovych Protopopov (Ukrainian: Віктор Павлович Протопопов; 22 October 1880, Yurky, Kobelyaksky Uyezd – 30 November 1957, Kyiv) was a Soviet and Ukrainian psychiatrist and academician of the Academy of Sciences of the Ukrainian SSR. Being a pupil of Vladimir Bekhterev, Protopopov founded his own pathophysiological school of thought in the Soviet psychiatry. Protopopov authored more than 110 articles.

He is also known for the "Protopopov's syndrome", or "Protopopov's triad", which consists of the tachycardia, dilatated pupils and obstipation in bipolar disorder (then known as manic-depressive psychosis).

== Awards ==
- Two Orders of Lenin
- Order of the Red Banner of Labour

== See also ==
- Vladimir Bekhterev
