= Pyotr Borovsky =

Russian physician (1863–1932)

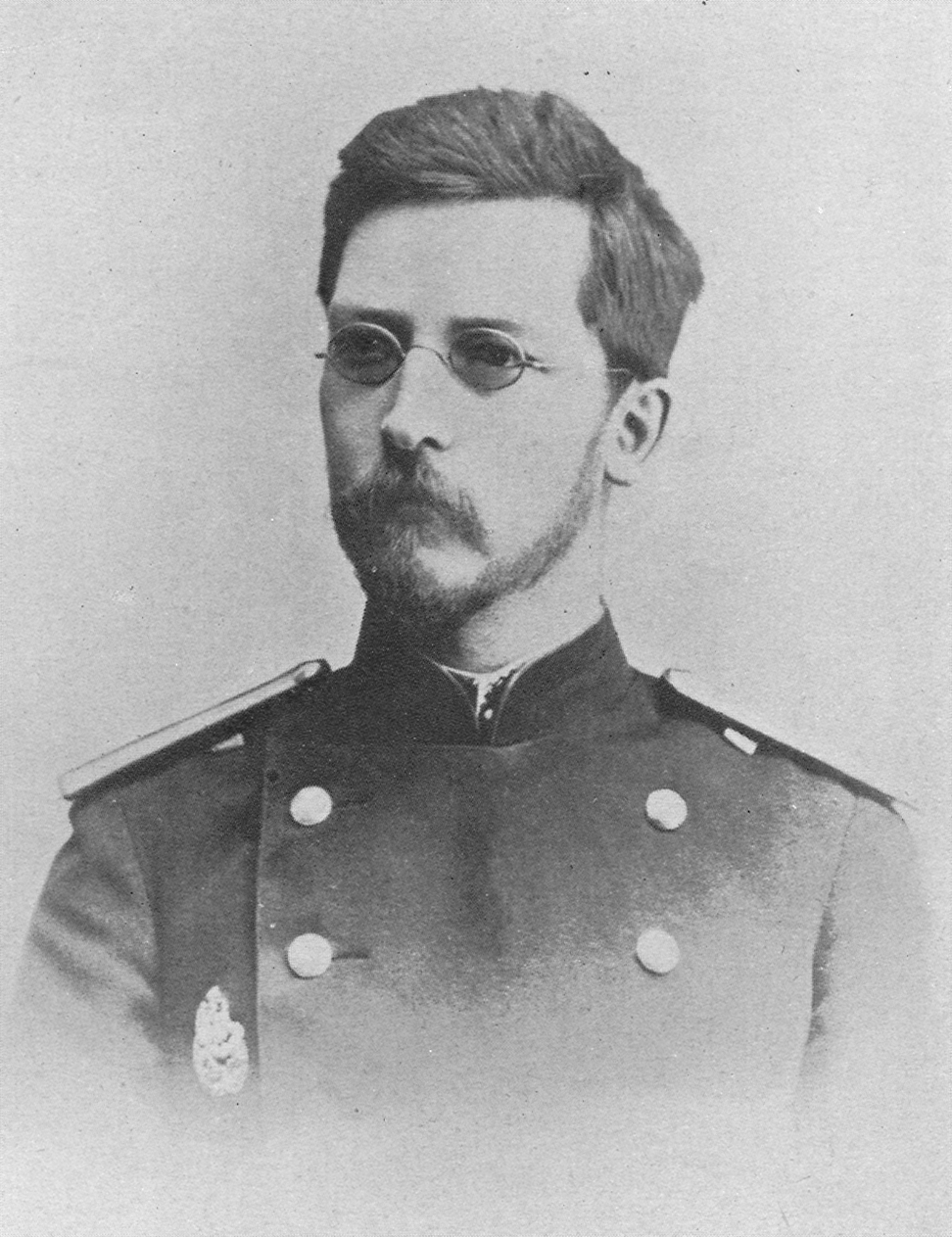
- Pyotr Borovsky, wearing the uniform of a medical officer in the Imperial Russian Army — at the age of 32, at the period when his researches on oriental sore were being conducted.
- Born: Pyotr Fokich Borovsky; 8 June 1863; Pogar, Starodub Uyezd, Chernigov Governorate, Russian Empire
- Died: 15 December 1932 (aged 69); Tashkent, Uzbek SSR, USSR
- Citizenship: Russian Empire, Soviet Union
- Education: Kyiv University, Military Medical Academy
- Known for: The first correct description of the causative agent of cutaneous leishmaniasis
- Scientific career
- Fields: Surgery
- Workplaces: Tashkent Military Hospital, Tashkent Medical Institute

Pyotr Fokich Borovsky (Russian: Пётр Фоки́ч Боро́вский, 8 June 1863 – 15 December 1932) was Russian and Soviet surgeon and public health administrator of who worked in Tashkent, professor of surgery in Tashkent Medical Institute.

Borovsky is credited for the first correct description of the causative agent of Oriental sore.

== Biography ==
Pyotr Borovsky was born on 8 June [O.S. 27 May] 1863 in Pogar, Starodub Uyezd, Chernigov Governorate, Russian Empire. After studying medicine and specializing in surgery at Kyiv University and the Military Medical Academy in Saint Petersburg, in 1892 he was sent to serve in Tashkent Military Hospital as head of surgical department and bacteriological laboratory.

Borovsky was one of the founders of Tashkent University Faculty of Medicine, that later became the Tashkent Medical Institute. He had been the head of Department of Hospital Surgery since 1920 and until his death in 1932. In 1927 he was awarded the Order of the Red Banner of Labour for his contributions to public health in Uzbek SSR.

== Oriental sore description ==
Borovsky became interested in exploring the aetiology of Sart sore, one of the local names for Oriental sore. He microscopically examined sections of sores excised in their early stages, before they ulcerated, and was able to detect oval bodies with a nucleus and a small process, which were usually located inside host cells, and made the correct conclusion that the observed organisms are the causative agents of this disease, and correctly ascribed it to Protozoa.

Borovsky published his observations in Russian Voenno-meditsinsky zhurnal (Medical-Military Journal) in 1898. Due to low circulation of that publication, his priority was internationally recognised much later.
