= Konrad Wagner =

Konrad Eduardovich Wagner
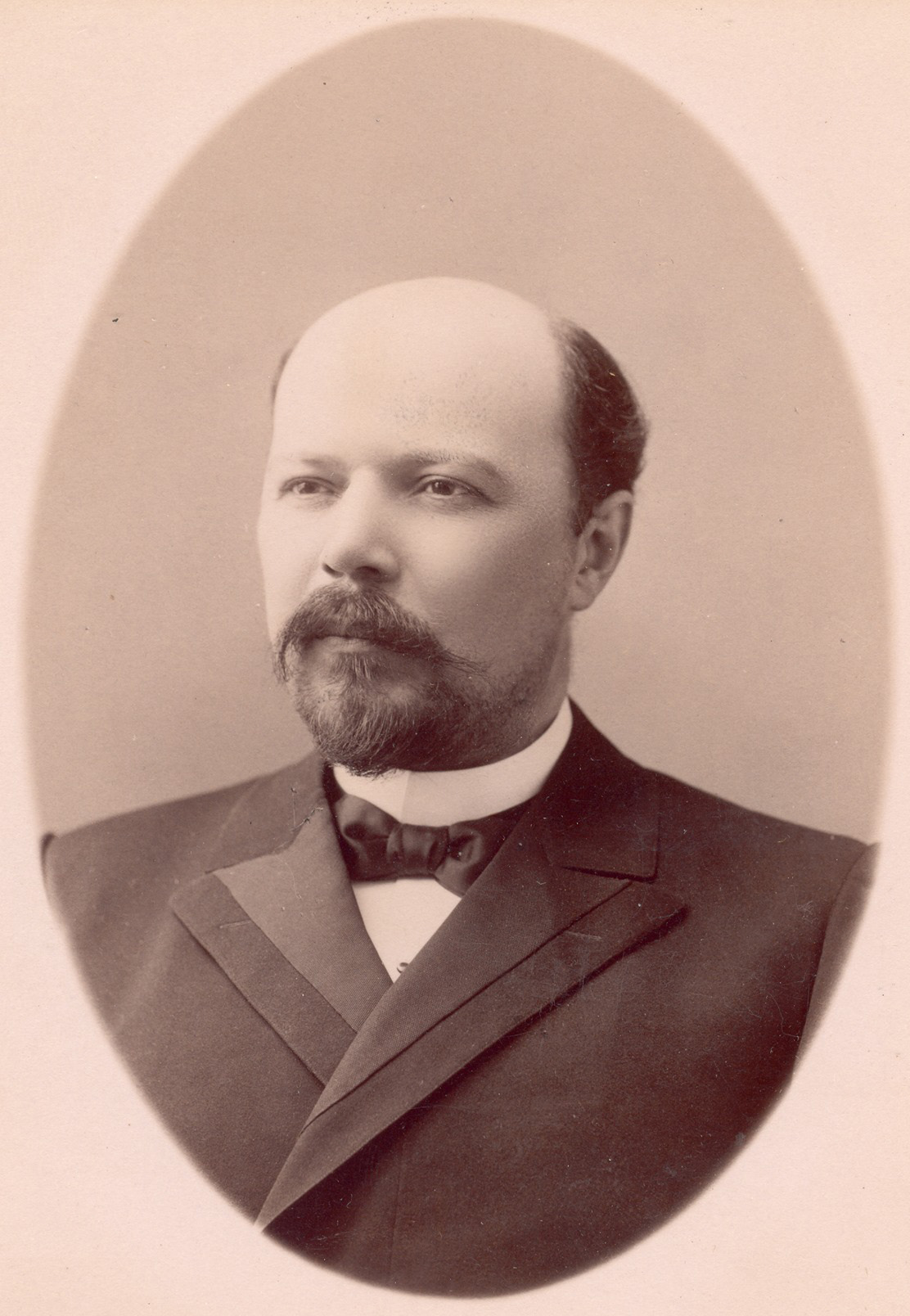
- Born: 17 July 1862; Praszka
- Died: after 1948; Kalisz, Poland
- Education: Doctor of Science (1889)
- Alma mater: Imperial Medical Academy in St. Petersburg
- Scientific career
- Fields: Internal medicine
- Institutions: University of Kiev; University of Moscow; Taurida University of Simferopol; University of Warsaw; Imperial Moscow University

Konrad Eduardovich Wagner (rus. Конрад Эдуардович Вагнер, 17 July 1862, Praszka – after 1948, Kalisz) was a Russian-Polish physician, professor of the University of Kiev, University of Moscow, Taurida University of Simferopol and University of Warsaw.

He studied medicine at the Imperial Medical Academy in St. Petersburg, graduated in 1886 and received doctor title cum eximia laude in 1889. 1886-1889 he was a resident in the propedeutics clinic, 1889-1891 assistant in Manassein's clinic of internal diseases. He studied abroad under Mechnikov and Roux at Pasteur Institute in Paris, in London, Vienna, Berlin, Leipzig, Strassburg and Prague under Huppert. In years 1891–1897 he was a Privatdozent in Sankt Petersburg, in 1897 he became professor and moved to Kiev, where he headed the diagnostics and therapeutics clinics. 1914-1917 he was professor at Moscow University. In years 1918-1920 professor in Simferopol. In the 1920s Wagner lived in Cairo. In 1931 he moved to Warsaw, where he was appointed professor of internal diseases. After World War II he lived for a short time in Piotrków, than moved to Kalisz, where he died about 1950.

== Selected publications ==
- Материалы по клиническому изучению колебаний в свойствах желудочного сока. Дисс. СПб., 1888
- Contribution à l'étude de l'immunité; le charbon des poules. Ann. de l'Inst. Pasteur 4, pp. 570–602, 1890
- Zur Frage der eosinophilen Leukocytose bei Echinokokkus der inneren Organe. Centralblatt für innere Medizin 29, pp. 129–144, 1908
- К вопросу о сужении и закрытии просвета верхней полой вены, 1914
- Przypadek pierwotnej błonicy palca. Medycyna 5 (23), pp. 785–787, 1931
- Przyczynki do symptomatologii zwężenia i zamknięcia światła górnej żyły głównej. Polska Gazeta Lekarska 11 (4, 5), ss. 61-65, 81-85, 1932
- Wskazania i wartości lecznicze Heluanu (w Egipcie). Medycyna 7 (13), pp. 397–403, 1933
- O czerwonce pełzakowej i jej leczeniu na podstawie spostrzeżeń w Egipcie. Medycyna 9 (18), pp. 597–605, 1935

== Bibliography ==
- Andreev, A.; Tsygankov, D. (2010). Imperial Moscow University: 1755-1917: encyclopedic dictionary. Moscow: Russian political encyclopedia (ROSSPEN). p. 111. ISBN 978-5-8243-1429-8.
