= Epilepsia partialis continua =

- Other names: Kojevnikov's or Kozhevnikov's epilepsia
- Specialty: Neurology

Epilepsia partialis continua is a rare type of brain disorder in which a patient experiences recurrent motor epileptic seizures that are focal (hands and face), and recur every few seconds or minutes for extended periods (days to years). It is sometimes called Kozhevnikov's epilepsia named after Russian psychiatrist Aleksei Yakovlevich Kozhevnikov who first described this type of epilepsy.

== Signs and symptoms ==
During these seizures, there is repetitive focal myoclonus or Jacksonian march. After a seizure has subsided, Todd's phenomenon may be observed, which includes transient unilateral weakness.

== Causes ==
There are numerous causes for this kind of seizure and they differ depending somewhat on the age at which the seizures begin. Epilepsy most often occurs at the extremes of life – in childhood or in very old age – but can develop at any time throughout one's life.

Although these seizures are usually due to large, acute brain lesions resulting from strokes in adults and focal cortical inflammatory processes in children (Rasmussen's encephalitis), possibly caused by chronic viral infections, edema, or autoimmune processes.

They are very medication and therapy-resistant, and the primary therapeutic goal is to stop secondary generalization. There are also many other reasons why these seizures occur. For example, they could be due to genetics, infections, or problems with brain development. Commonly the cause is unknown.

An infection of the brain (encephalitis) can also be a contributing factor. Although this sort of infection is uncommon it can be due to a virus, bacterium, or (very rarely) fungus. If a seizure happens during the infection itself, the person most likely does not have epilepsy but has "symptomatic seizures" or seizures occurring because of a known injury to the brain. Once the infection is stopped the seizures will stop. Another more common infection is "meningitis", infection of the membranes surrounding the brain. Since this infection does not directly involve the brain it might not appear as a possible cause of epilepsy, but has been shown that meningitis can cause epilepsy, which would give rise to the possibility of developing epilepsy partialis continua. These infections are most likely to result in epilepsy when they occur at an early age.

Problems with brain development can also be a factor. The brain undergoes a complicated process during development in which neurons are born and must travel to the surface of the brain. Here they wind up carefully placed in six distinct layers of the cerebral cortex. Throughout the brain, the placement of these neurons is normally quite precise. If this system does not work exactly right, neurons can develop outside their appropriate areas. If this happens then the firing or circuitry of the brain is not right, and an abnormal, epileptic circuit can result.

== Treatment ==
Identification of the underlying cause plays an important role in treatment. Brain abscesses or tumors can be—at least temporarily or partially, if not fully and permanently—surgically treated and chemotherapy and/or radiotherapy is given to the patient. If seizures do continue, various anticonvulsant medication regimens that can be tolerated by the patient can be tested and if need be, administered, either orally, or in emergency conditions such as status epilepticus after tonic-clonic (grand mal) seizures, intravenously. If stroke or other similar, transient disorders occur (cerebrovascular accident, or transient ischemic attack, TIA), then neurological imaging of the affected lobes or hemispheres of the brain can be performed (CT, MRI, PET, etc.) and, if not absolutely contraindicated, antithrombolytic therapy might be given if it can be tolerated due to the seizures; if a hemorrhagic stroke has occurred and surgery can be performed to cauterize the vessel or otherwise stop the bleeding, it will be attempted if it can be done safely.
