= George Tavartkiladze =

Russian audiologist (born 1948)

- Георгий Абелович Таварткиладзе
- Born: 23 August 1948 (age 78); Tbilisi, Georgian SSR, Soviet Union
- Education: Second Moscow State Medical Institute
- Known for: Ipsilateral suppression of otoacoustic emissions; Introduction of cochlear implantation and newborn hearing screening in Russia
- Awards: Order of Friendship (1996); Order of Honour (2015); IFOS Gold Medal (2023)
- Scientific career
- Fields: Audiology, otorhinolaryngology
- Workplaces: Moscow ENT Research Institute; National Research Centre for Audiology and Hearing Rehabilitation; Russian Medical Academy of Continuing Professional Education

George Abelovich Tavartkiladze (Russian: Георгий Абелович Таварткиладзе; born 23 August 1948) is a Georgian-born Russian audiologist and otorhinolaryngologist. His research has dealt with the electrophysiology of hearing, otoacoustic emissions and the micromechanics of the outer hair cells. He founded the National Research Centre for Audiology and Hearing Rehabilitation in Moscow in 1988 and served as its director until 2020.

Tavartkiladze serves as president of the National Medical Association of Audiologists. He was president of the International Society of Audiology from 2006 to 2008 and its secretary general from 2012 to 2024, and president of the Collegium Oto-Rhino-Laryngologicum Amicitiae Sacrum in 2006. He is a recipient of the Order of Friendship and the Order of Honour.

== Early life and education ==
Tavartkiladze was born on 23 August 1948 in Tbilisi, Georgian SSR. He finished secondary school in 1966 and went to Moscow to study at the Second Moscow State Medical Institute. He graduated in 1973 and remained at the institute as a resident until 1975.

From 1975 to 1977, Tavartkiladze worked at the Tbilisi State Medical Institute for postgraduate training under Simon Khechinashvili. He completed his candidate of medical sciences dissertation, on acoustic impedancemetry and tubosonometry in audiological diagnosis, in 1977.

== Career ==
Tavartkiladze joined the Moscow ENT Research Institute in 1978 and headed its laboratory of audiology and hearing aid fitting from 1983 to 1988. In November 1988 the All-Union Research Centre for Audiology and Hearing Rehabilitation was established by decree of the Soviet Ministry of Health for research in the field and the coordinating body for its audiological services, and Tavartkiladze was appointed director. Later, the centre was renamed the Russian Scientific Centre for Audiology and Hearing Rehabilitation and was transferred to the Federal Medical-Biological Agency in 2008. Under his direction the centre developed Russia's newborn hearing screening system and its multichannel cochlear implantation programme in 1991. According to the Russian Academy of Education, Tavartkiladze founded Russia's first multichannel cochlear implantation centre. He remained director until 2020.

Tavartkiladze was the first president of Russian Society of Audiology, which was founded in 2001. He joined the executive of the International Society of Audiology in 2002, was its president from 2006 to 2008, and served as secretary general from 2012 to 2024.

Tavartkiladze is president of the International Academy of Otorhinolaryngology, Head and Neck Surgery and honorary editor-in-chief of the academy's journal Folia Otorhinolaryngologiae et Pathologiae Respiratoriae. He was president of the Collegium Oto-Rhino-Laryngologicum Amicitiae Sacrum for 2006 and presided over its 73rd annual meeting in Moscow.

Tavartkiladze represents Russia on the World Health Organization expert advisory panel for the prevention of deafness and hearing loss and in the European Federation of Audiology Societies. He was a member of the foundation committee of the WHO World Hearing Forum at its establishment in 2018, representing the International Society of Audiology, and co-led its resource mobilisation workstream. He co-chaired the working group on affected populations of the Lancet Commission on Hearing Loss, convened in 2019 in partnership with The Lancet and the World Health Organization.

Tavartkiladze is a foreign member of the Georgian National Academy of Sciences and an honorary doctor of the National Academy of Sciences of Armenia. He is also president of the National Medical Association of Audiologists.

== Research ==
Tavartkiladze's research has centred on the electrophysiology of hearing and on otoacoustic emissions, their ipsilateral suppression, as well as the electromotility of the outer hair cells and the recording of electrically evoked auditory potentials. With colleagues at the Research Centre for Audiology and Hearing Rehabilitation, Tavartkiladze set out in 1994 to test whether the olivocochlear efferent system was involved in ipsilateral suppression of transient evoked otoacoustic emissions, as it was known to be in contralateral suppression; they concluded that efferent effects were negligible, given the short latencies they measured. In their measurement method, a single-click response is subtracted from a double-click response to derive the suppressed emission. It became one of the two methods used to quantify temporal suppression and was taken up by Kevanishvili and colleagues and by Hine and Thornton. His group was the first to report augmentation, which is an increase instead of a reduction in emission amplitude. Kapadia and Lutman did not reproduce this for leading suppressor clicks and attributed the difference to measurement technique. A 2008 comparison of the two paradigms concluded that the method carried a phase artefact that could account for the reported augmentation.

With Gregory Frolenkov and colleagues at the National Institute on Deafness and Other Communication Disorders, he showed in 1997 that isolated outer hair cells bend as well as contract when stimulated by an external electric field oriented across the cell body.

Tavartkiladze has also worked on newborn hearing screening. With colleagues he documented the results of Russia's national programme, which replaced targeted screening of high-risk infants with universal screening in 2008. Working with the Research Centre for Medical Genetics in Moscow, Tavartkiladze has studied the genetics of hearing loss. He and his colleagues examined 264 children aged between three weeks and eleven months with bilateral sensorineural hearing loss and found biallelic GJB2 mutations in 64.8 per cent, a higher proportion than among older patients. The group has also studied OTOF-related auditory neuropathy and hearing loss caused by changes in the STRC gene.

== Awards ==
- 1996 - Order of Friendship, President of the Russian Federation
- 2012 - Knight of Childhood honorary title, Russian Children's Fund
- 2015 - Order of Honour, President of the Russian Federation
- 2024 - Member of Honour, International Society of Audiology
- 2023 - Gold Medal, International Federation of Otorhinolaryngological Societies

== Selected publications ==
- Frolenkov, G. I.; Kalinec, F.; Tavartkiladze, G. A.; Kachar, B. (1997). "Cochlear outer hair cell bending in an external electric field". Biophysical Journal. 73 (3): 1665–1672. doi:10.1016/S0006-3495(97)78198-0. PMC 1181065. PMID 9284333.
- Tavartkiladze, G. A.; Frolenkov, G. I.; Kruglov, A. V.; Artamasov, S. V. (1997). "Ipsilateral suppression of transient evoked otoacoustic emissions". In Robinette, M. S.; Glattke, T. J. (eds.). Otoacoustic Emissions: Clinical Applications. New York: Thieme. pp. 110–129. ISBN 0-86577-579-6.
- Parazzini, M.; Brazzale, A. R.; Paglialonga, A.; Tognola, G.; Collet, L.; Moulin, A.; Lutman, M. E.; Bell, S. L.; Thomas, N. A.; Uloziene, I.; Uloza, V.; Thuroczy, G.; Tavartkiladze, G.; Tsalighopoulos, M.; Kyriafinis, G.; Ravazzani, P. (November 2007). "Effects of GSM cellular phones on human hearing: the European project "GUARD"". Radiation Research. 168 (5): 608–613. doi:10.1667/RR1020.1. hdl:11380/607824. PMID 17973552.
- Parazzini, M.; Sibella, F.; Lutman, M. E.; Mishra, S.; Moulin, A.; Sliwinska-Kowalska, M.; Woznicka, E.; Politanski, P.; Zmyslony, M.; Thuroczy, G.; Molnár, F.; Kubinyi, G.; Tavartkiladze, G.; Bronyakin, S.; Uloziene, I.; Uloza, V.; Gradauskiene, E.; Ravazzani, P. (August 2009). "Effects of UMTS cellular phones on human hearing: results of the European project EMFnEAR". Radiation Research. 172 (2): 244–251. doi:10.1667/RR1679.1. PMID 19630529.
- Таварткиладзе, Г. А. (2023). Клиническая аудиология. Национальное руководство в 3-х томах. Moscow: GEOTAR-Media.
- Tavartkiladze, G. A. (2023). "Brainstem auditory evoked potential: general interpretation, its nature and peripheral versus central systems aspects". In Durrant, J. D.; Fowler, C. G.; Ferraro, J. A.; Purdy, S. C. (eds.). Basic Concepts of Clinical Electrophysiology in Audiology. San Diego: Plural Publishing. ISBN 978-1-63550-175-9.
