= Grigory Ivanovich Rossolimo =

Russian physician (1880–1928)

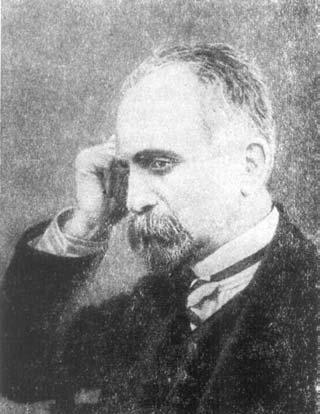
Grigory Ivanovich Rossolimo (1840–1928)

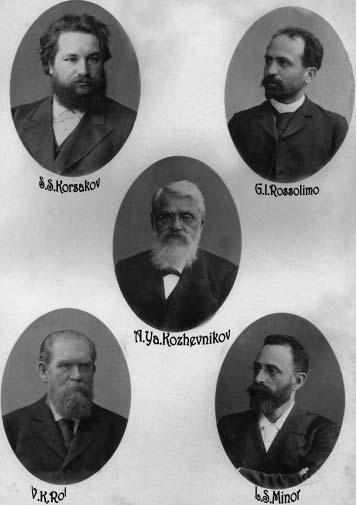
Tableau depicting Moscow neurologists, Rossolimo at the upper right

Grigory Ivanovich Rossolimo (Russian: Григо́рий Ива́нович Россоли́мо; 17 December [O.S. 5 December] 1860 – September 1928) was a Russian and Soviet neurologist who was a native of Odessa. He was of Greek origin; his grandfather had gone sailing from the ionian island of Kefalonia as a young man, been shipwrecked, and washed up near Odessa, where he remained for the rest of his life. He specialized in the field of child neuropsychology.

== Biography ==
In 1884 he graduated from the University of Moscow, and subsequently worked under Aleksei Kozhevnikov (1836–1902) at the clinic of neurological diseases. He earned his medical doctorate in 1887, and in 1890 became head of the department of neurology at the clinic of Aleksei Alekseevich Ostroumov (1844–1908).

In 1911, along with other academic personnel at the University of Moscow, he resigned in protest against reactionary reforms installed by the minister of education. Afterwards, he opened his own institute of neurology and child psychology. In 1917 he returned to the university, and attained the chair of neuropathology. In this position, he established a department for child psycho-neurology and "defectology".

Rossolimo is remembered for his work in experimental psychology, research that included the development of psychological profiles. A particular study of his involved grouping children according to psycho-physiological characteristics and anomalies.

He was co-founder of the "Korsakov Journal of Neurology and Psychiatry", a publication named in honor of Sergei Sergeievich Korsakoff (1853–1900).

== Associated eponym ==
- Rossolimo's reflex: Exaggerated flexion of the toes in response to percussion of the plantar surface of the second to fifth toes, and is indicative of lesions of the pyramidal tract.

== Cultural mentions ==
Rossolimo is mentioned in Mikhail Bulgakov's story, "The Fateful Eggs".

Rossolimo was a contemporary and friend of the author Anton Chekhov, who was also a physician by training (Satran, 2005b). Chekhov's letters to Rossolimo can be found in "A life in letters" (Chekhov, A., 2004).

== See also ==
- Ivan Bekh, professor

== Sources ==
- "Grigorii Ivanovich Rossolimo". Who Named It. Archived from the original on August 17, 2002.
- The collected works of L.S. Vygotsky, Vol. 2, p. 315 (brief bio in footnote).
- Satran, R. (2005a). G. I. Rossolimo (1860–1928). Journal of Neurology, 252, 1423–1424
- Satran, R. (2005b). Chekhov and Rossolimo Careers in medicine and neurology in Russia 100 years ago. Neurology, 64(1), 121-127.
- Chekhov, A. (2004). A Life in Letters. (A. Phillips & R. Bartlett, Trans.). London: Penguin Classics
