= Ekaterina Shabelskaya =

Russian psychologist

- Born: Ekaterina Mikhailovna Shabelskaya; Moscow, Russia
- Citizenship: Russian
- Scientific career
- Fields: psychology

Ekaterina Mikhailovna Shabelskaya is a Russian psychologist, systemic family therapist, emotionally focused therapist, and supervisor. She is the founder and director of a psychological center in Zhukovka and serves as the head of the Student Counseling Service at the Center for Systemic Family Therapy (CSFT).

== Biography and education ==
In 2006, Shabelskaya graduated from the Moscow State University of Economics, Statistics and Informatics (MESI) with a degree in management.

In 2011, she graduated from the Humanitarian Institute in Moscow with a degree in psychology, qualifying as a psychologist and psychology instructor.

In 2014, she completed professional retraining in Systemic Family Psychotherapy at the National Research University Higher School of Economics (HSE).

In 2018, she completed the "Theory and Practice of Systemic Family Psychotherapy" program at the Center for Systemic Family Therapy, qualifying as a systemic family therapist and emotionally focused therapist. She also obtained international certification in accordance with the standards of the International Centre for Excellence in Emotionally Focused Therapy (ICEEFT).

== Professional career ==
Shabelskaya specializes in systemic family psychotherapy, emotionally focused therapy, and psychological counseling for individuals, couples, and families.

She maintains a private practice and provides counseling to individuals, couples, families, business executives, and professional athletes.

She is the founder and director of a psychological center in Zhukovka, Moscow Oblast. At the Center for Systemic Family Therapy, she serves as the head of the Student Counseling Service.

Shabelskaya is a member of the editorial board of the scientific and practical online journal Psychology and Family Psychotherapy.

She has appeared as a psychology expert in Russian media and has contributed articles to publications including Psychologies, Marie Claire, Hello!, and Parents. She also participated in discussions on the draft federal law "On the Foundations of the Regulation of Psychological Activity in the Russian Federation."
