= Yuliya Gippenreyter =

Russian psychologist

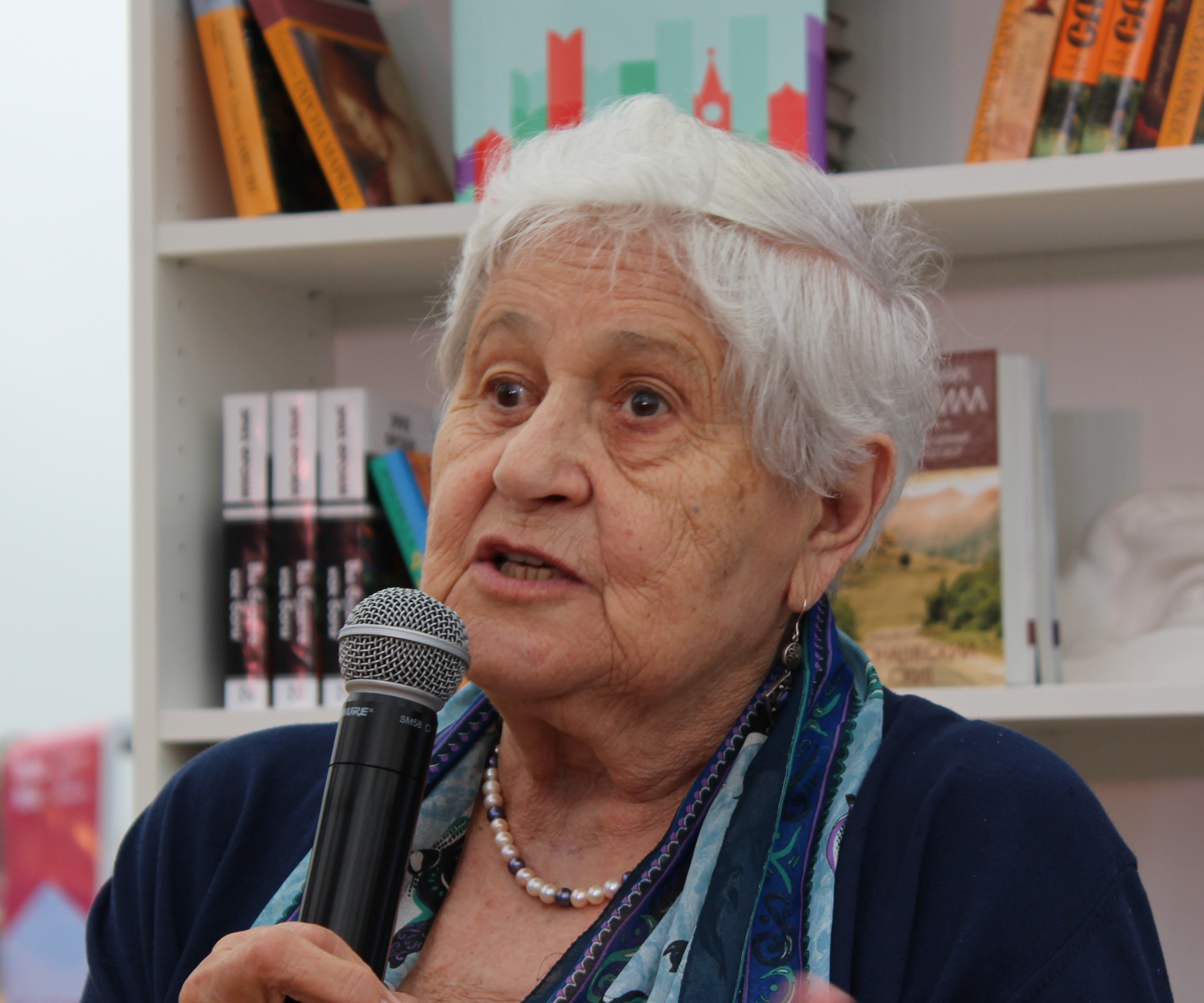
- Gippenreyter in 2015
- Born: 25 March 1930
- Occupation: Psychologist

Julia Gippenreiter (Russian:Ю́лия Бори́совна Гиппенре́йтер; born 25 March 1930, in Moscow) is a modern Russian psychologist, a specialist in experimental psychology, psychophysiology, family therapy and neuro-linguistic programming.

Gippenreiter is one of the founders of psychotherapy in Russia. Her doctoral thesis (1975) studied psychophysiology of eye movement in the context of various performances.

She is an author of more than 80 scientific publications, including a monograph on Human Eyes Movement (1978), a university study book on General Psychology (1988) and several popular books on family and children psychology. She popularized active listening as a useful communication tool for families.
