= Khalida Mamanova =

Kazakh professor of medicine (1918–1977)

Khalida Mamanova Yessenkulovna
- Native name: Маманова Халида Есенғұлқызы
- Born: 24 March 1918; Kara-Agach village, Aksu District, Almaty Region (located within present-day Zhansugirov District), Kazakhstan
- Died: 15 August 1977 (aged 59) Bulgaria
- Allegiance: Soviet Union
- Branch: Red Army
- Service years: 1942–1945
- Rank: Captain of Medical Service
- Awards: Order of the Red Star
- Other work: Doctor of Medical Sciences

Khalida Mamanova Yessenkulovna (Kazakh: Маманова Халида Есенғұлқызы; 24 March 1918 – 15 August 1977) was a Kazakhstani professor, medical doctor, and participant of the Second World War. She was the only Kazakh woman to fight in a penal battalion.

== Personality ==
Descended from the Matai clan of the Naiman tribe. According to the recollections of people who knew Yessenkulovna personally, she was attractive and of average height. She was a restrained woman and rarely raised her voice. Although the nightmare caused by the surrounding authorities did not permit her to do much, she endured everything in silence, never losing her touch of kindness and passion to help others.

== Ancestors ==
- Dating back to the thirteenth century, the Mamanov family was known by many names over time: Bayan Khan, Matai Boribay batyr, Kaptagay batyr, Kadyrali bi, Dosetuly Kalkabay, Taneke batyr. Each family has left a mark on history. Khalida's family helped those in need by providing food, shelter and work.
- The Mamanovs sponsored the Qazaq newspaper. They opened the Kazakh school "Mamania" in Zhetysu, where the children of the poor studied and lived for free. At first, it had two-year classes, then four-year; a decade later, it had eight-year classes. To become a teacher there, one had to go through the serious competition. Subsequently, such prominent figures as Bilyal Suleev, Ilyas Zhansugurov, Mukhamedzhan Tynyshpaev and others graduated from this educational institution.
- Khalida's uncle Turysbek had large trading houses in Tashkent, Bukhara, Namangan, Zharkent, Kyzylzhar. The city of Kapal was built on his money. For this, he received from Tsar Nikolai II Alexandrovich Romanov the Order of St. George of the 3rd degree, and was awarded gold and silver medals and was the governor of the Volost territory for many years.
- Seitbattal and Yessenkul Mamanov organized a mobile customs picket, roaming along the Great Silk Road, collecting duties from caravans.

=== Tragic fate ===
After the revolution, 15 members of the Mamanov family were shot and 36 families were exiled. Yessenkul, Khalida's father, was convicted under Article 58 and exiled from Kazakhstan for three years. In 1928, his property was confiscated. The entire family moved to the city of Chkalov. Yessenkulovna's father managed to get a job as a labourer, and her mother worked at a garment factory as a seamstress. Yessenkulovna was 10 years old at that time. She was the oldest of six children. In exile, her father died of tuberculosis and some months later two younger brothers died as well. The family moved to the city of Alma-Ata in 1932.

== Childhood ==
=== Early life ===
Yessenkulovna was born on March 24 (some sources indicate that she was born on the 27th of September) in 1918 in the village of Kara-Agach, Aksu district, Alma-Ata region, in the family of Mamanov Esengul, a large cattle breeder. She came from the noble family of the Mamanovs, whose contribution to the education of the Kazakhs, even after a century, no one could surpass. According to eyewitnesses, her family must have been very large since Yessenkulovna's father had several wives, but each wife lived separately.

Yessenkulovna was her mother's third child. When she was seven years old, she was brought to Alma-Ata to study there. But for a long time, her parents could not send her to any school, because the girl absolutely could not speak Russian. Therefore, she was homeschooled and taught by a family of Russian teachers. "It was a large house with a garden on one of the main streets of the city. The couple had three children. The hostess was elderly and treated me well, and she became my teacher. She spent several hours every day with me. I could not understand Russian for a long time. Katya, the daughter of the hostess, helped me a lot. She was two years older. We were inseparable. So in two years, I mastered the language and literacy. In the third grade I was accepted to school," – shared Khalida.

=== Teenage life ===
After graduating from a seven-year school, Khalida entered the Uralsk technical school. But in the same year, the educational institution was closed due to a lack of funds. Then Khalida Yessenkulovna studied at the pharmaceutical technical school in Semipalatinsk, then at the preparatory department of the medical institute, and in 1937 she started her first year at that institute. However, the past of a noble family overtook the "daughter of a feudal lord": they expelled her from the Komsomol and from the university too. Over the years, she recovered with huge difficulties. Her family lived in constant tension until 1958.

By the decision of the State Examination Commission of the Kazakh Medical Institute named after Molotov, on December 31, 1941, Mamanova Khalida qualified as a medical doctor. Khalida studied as a graduate student at the Institute of Physiology of the Academy of Sciences, but she failed to continue her studies.

== Years of war ==
- In February 1942 they drafted her into the ranks of the Red Army. Graduates of the medical institute were typically awarded the rank of lieutenant. Khalida Mamanova was not granted this rank, nor could she be a nurse, because she was the daughter of a dispossessed enemy of the people. For that, instead of a medical bag, they handed her a shovel to dig trenches and graves. Not having achieved the rank and service of a military doctor, she wrote to Stalin: “If I am an enemy of the people, send me to the penal company. If I stay alive, drop all charges against me and my relatives”. After a while, she found herself in a company with prisoners and political prisoners. She was the only woman among them. These prisoners covered her with themselves during attacks; thanks to them she remained alive.
- Later, she was transferred to the 821st air battalion as the head of the ambulance station. At Stalingrad, her battalion was fighting from the beginning until the very defeat of the Nazis. Then, as part of the 4th Ukrainian, 3rd Belorussian fronts and the 1st and 2nd Ukrainian fronts, she took part in the liberation of Poland, Czechoslovakia, Germany, and Austria. There Khalida Yessenkulovna reached Berlin. By order of the Southwestern Front No. 0386 in April 1943 they awarded her the rank of a senior lieutenant of the medical service, by another order of June 24, 1945 – the rank of captain of the medical service. She returned home with the rank of captain.
- In August 1943, she was appointed as a chief gynaecologist of the 24th Air Force Base of the Second Air Army. At first, she provided medical assistance to signalmen, telephonists, and radio operators, then helped the girls from the women's air regiments to recover. Before demobilization in 1946, she treated about 1,500 women. Since August 1943, she conducted 216 visits and examinations of female personnel of units, covering a total of 11,200 people. Khalida provided medical care and treatment to 1,482 women and organized 128 feminine hygiene rooms. Held 584 lectures with female personnel on various hygienic topics and, in particular, which resulted in an absence of cases of syphilis among the female personnel served.

== Postwar ==
From February 1946 until September 1950, she worked at the Kazakh Medical Institute as an assistant in the Department of Pathological Physiology. While working there, she completed the experimental part of her PhD thesis, but again the Bai origin became another obstacle in her way. She was denied the defense of her scientific work, and Khalida's mentor, professor, doctor of medical sciences Glozman O.S., advised her to go to Kyrgyzstan. Thanks to him, she managed to defend her work in Moscow and receive a diploma as a candidate in medical sciences.

When the "Doctors' Plot" began throughout the country of Soviets, Khalida Yessenkulovna again came to the attention of well-known services – after all, she was the daughter of an enemy of the people. And then her mentors intervened. After some time she was sent to the department at the Karaganda Medical University in 1954, and when a former classmate of hers opened the medical institute in Aktyubinsk in 1959, the rector of the institute invited her to be the head of the department. She worked there for about twenty years, until 1977.

In 1969, Khalida Mamanova, by the decision of the Higher Attestation Commission, became a Doctor of Medical Sciences. Her work-monograph (on oncological diseases) was read at the international congress in Paris. Many of her students became famous specialists and scientists.

Returning from Moscow after defending her doctoral dissertation, Khalida Yessenkulovna initiated the creation of an ensemble of folk instruments, where students studied. She was called to the regional party committee and was accused of nationalism and undermining socialist enlightenment and education. She was also denied a working trip to Mexico and Central America. Nevertheless, they allowed her to visit socialist Bulgaria, which was her last trip. They sent a delegation of Aktobe doctors to the golden sands of Bulgaria. After several days of rest, the body of Khalida Mamanova was found early in the morning on the beach, far from the main resting places.

== Mysterious death ==
According to forensic experts, the woman drowned late in the evening, although she did not like to swim at that time. They found an enormous bruise on the body. While swimming, the doctor could hit herself when the wave carried her to the concrete pier, although there is a huge chance someone else could have hit her.

Relatives claim that the national security committees of Bulgaria and Kazakhstan were involved in this case. They did not give the body of the deceased to relatives for two weeks. After the incident, many talked that someone murdered her, although this has not been confirmed by anyone. But there are still strong doubts about the impartiality of those who at one time investigated that mysterious case.

Based on the Law of the Republic of Kazakhstan, "On the rehabilitation of victims of mass political repressions", dated April 14, 1993, No. 2144, Mamanova Khalida Yessenkulovna was recognized as a victim of repression and rehabilitated. But under the totalitarian Soviet regime, anything could have happened. Khalida Yessenkulovna worked from 1959 to 1977 at the Aktobe Medical Institute. By order No. 164 of September 1, 1977, Kh. E. Mamanova was expelled because of her death.

In 1980, the rector of the institute A.S. Smagulov started an application to the city court of Aktobe about the confiscation of Mamanova's apartment. Her son at that time was in the Soviet army. When the demobilized soldier returned home, there were already strangers living there, and everything that was in the apartment disappeared, including all the documents of Khalida Yessenkulovna and her scientific works. Over thirty years have passed since then, but it is not possible to find out how it happened. Thus, neither the KNB nor the Ministry of Internal Affairs knows anything. It turns out that the family of Khalida Mamanova was subjected to confiscation and repression in 1928, and again in 1981.

== Legacy ==
- By the decision of the eighteenth session of the maslikhat of the city of Aktobe dated June 6, 2005, No. 147, a memorial plaque was installed in honour of the participant of the Great Patriotic War, the first Kazakh woman – doctor of medical sciences, professor Mamanova Khalida Yessenkulovna at the address: Aktobe city, Abay ave., 4.
- In 2005, a memorial plaque was installed in the house where veteran Khalida Mamanova lived.
- In 2006, one of the central streets of the South-West micro-district in Aktobe was named after her.
- As part of her centenary, conferences were held in Almaty, Aktobe.
- In honour of the founder of the Department of Pathological Physiology of the West Kazakhstan Medical University, named after M. Ospanov in Aktobe, an alley is built.

== Works ==
- On the pathogenesis of cancer. In the book. Questions of oncology and radiology, A.-A., 1963;
- Isohemagglutinins and heterohemagglutinins as nonspecific factors of the reactivity of the human body and animals, M., 1967.

== Awards ==
The courage and heroism of Khalida Esengulovna were awarded the Order of the Red Star, medals "For the Defense of Stalingrad", "For the Victory over Germany in the Great Patriotic War of 1941–1945" and other awards. On December 26, 1945, they demobilized her due to a front wound.

== See also ==
- Great Patriotic War
