= National Academy of Educational Sciences of Ukraine =

Scientific institution

The National Academy of Educational Sciences of Ukraine (abbr. NAES, Ukrainian: Національна академія педагогічних наук України, НАПНУ, romanized: Natsionalna akademiia pedahohichnykh nauk Ukrainy, NAPNU) is a scientific institution that was established in 1992 by the special decrees of the President of Ukraine and the Cabinet of Ministers of Ukraine.

== Membership and officers ==
The total membership of the academy is 156 members (51 acting members and 84 corresponding members). The academy has 21 foreign members.

Academician Vasyl Kremen is the president of the academy, the first vice-president Volodymyr Luhovyi, Doctor Habilitated of Education Sciences, professor, academician of the NAES of Ukraine, vice president – Oleg Topuzov, Doctor Habilitated of Education Sciences, professor, corresponding member of the NAES of Ukraine.

== Departments ==
The Academy of Pedagogical Sciences has five departments.

- General Pedagogy and Philosophy of Education Department – academician-secretary Svitlana Sysoieva, Doctor Habilitated of Education Sciences, professor, Academician of the NAES of Ukraine.
- Psychology, Age Physiology and Defectology Department – academician-secretary Sergiy Maksymenko, Doctor Habilitated of Psychological Sciences, professor, academician of the NAES of Ukraine.
- General Secondary Education Department – academician-secretary Oleksandr Liashenko, Doctor Habilitated of Education Sciences, professor, academician of the NAES of Ukraine.
- Professional and Adult Education Department – academician-secretary Nellia Nychkalo, Doctor Habilitated of Education Sciences, professor, academician of the NAES of Ukraine.
- Higher Education Department – academician-secretary Petro Saukh, Doctor Habilitated of Philosophical Sciences, professor, corresponding member of the NAES of Ukraine.

== Institutes and centres ==
The academy coordinates follow Institutes and centres:

- Institute of Pedagogy H.S. Kostyuk Institute of Psychology
- Ivan Ziazun Institute of Pedagogical and Adult Education
- Institute of Problems on Education
- Mykola Yarmachenko Institute of Special Pedagogy and Psychology
- Institute of Social and Political Psychology
- Institute of Higher Education
- Institute of Information Technologies and Learning Tools
- Institute of Vocational Education and Training
- Institute of Gifted Child
- State Higher Educational Institution «University of Educational Management»
- Ukrainian Scientific and Methodical Centre of Applied Psychology and Social Work
- V.O. Sukhomlynskyi State Scientific and Pedagogical Library of Ukraine

== Publication activity ==
The publishing activities of the academy is realized by the publishing house “Pedahohichna Dumka” (Pedagogical Thought). The main periodical editions of the academy are the magazine “Pedahohika i Psykholohia” (Pedagogics and Psychology) and Pedahohichna Hazeta (Pedagogical Newspaper). Besides the academy is one of the founders of other professional scientific and methodical magazines such as: “The Way of Education,” “Art and Education,” “Computer at School and Home,” “Vocational and Technical Education,” “Biology and Chemistry at School,” “Ukrainian Language and Literature at School,” “Mathematics at School,” “Defectology,” “Higher Education of Ukraine,” “Continuous Vocational Education: Theory and Practice,” etc.

The Coordination Council of Pedagogical and Psychological Sciences was formed at the Presidium of the Academy of Pedagogical Sciences of Ukraine.

== Educational activity ==
Carrying out at the third educational-scientific and scientific levels of higher education. About 300 persons are at postgraduate study, 50 persons – at doctoral study. Sixteen specialized scientific councils, operating in ten subordinate institutions take part in the system of attestation of scientific and scientific-pedagogical personnel. Preparation of higher education candidates at the first (bachelor) and the second (master) educational-scientific levels and annually improvement of qualification (postgraduate education) of 5000 persons are carrying out. The Interagency Council for the Scientific Research Coordination in the Field of Education, Pedagogy and Psychology at the Presidium of the NAES of Ukraine annually examines about 600 topics of theses for the PhD and D.Sc. scientific degrees. Contribution to the reformation of education in Ukraine: more than 100 analytic materials, expert assessments and proposals to drafts of laws and normative and legislative documents, information, analytical, reference and statistic materials for parliamentary hearings and annual state reports are submitting annually. General secondary, vocational, higher education state standards, as well as concepts and programs of education, pedagogy and psychology development in Ukraine are working out.

The academy works in friendly contacts with cognate scientific structures of the National Academy of Sciences of Ukraine and other Ukrainian state academies. It establishes and renovates contacts with scientific institutes of SND (the Community of Independent States) and other foreign countries (Bulgaria, Greece, Germany, Slovakia, Serbia, Canada, Poland, Romania, France, China and others).

For the purpose of Ukraine integration in the European and world system of education, pedagogical and psychological sciences the contacts are established with UNESCO, Council of Europe, other international organizations.

== See also ==
- Education in Ukraine

== Sources list ==
- Національна академія педагогічних наук України: 1992-2022 рр. : монографія / Нац. акад. пед. наук України ; [редкол.: В.Г. Кремень (голова), В.І. Луговий (заступник голови), О.М. Топузов (заступник голови)] ; за заг. ред. В.Г. Кременя. Київ : Педагогічна думка, 2022. 424 с. Бібліогр.: с. 49. DOI: https://doi.org/10.37472/NAES-1992-2022. — ISBN 978-966-644-615-5.
