= Sergei Korsakov =

Russian neuropsychiatrist (1854–1900)

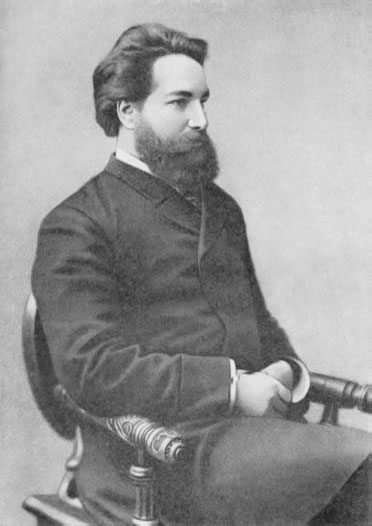
Korsakov in 1885

Sergei Sergeyevich Korsakov (Russian: Серге́й Серге́евич Ко́рсаков; 22 January 1854, Gus-Khrustalny – 1 May 1900, Moscow) was a Russian neuropsychiatrist, known for his studies on alcoholic psychosis. His name is lent to the eponymous Korsakov's syndrome and Wernicke–Korsakoff syndrome.

== Early life and education ==
Sergei Korsakov was the first great Russian neuropsychiatrist. He studied medicine at the Moscow State University, graduated in 1875 and subsequently became a physician at the "Preobrazhenski" (Russian: Преображенский) mental hospital.

From 1876 to 1879, he gained postgraduate experience in the clinic for nervous diseases under Aleksei Kozhevnikov. His thesis Alcoholic Paralysis gained him a medical doctorate in 1887.

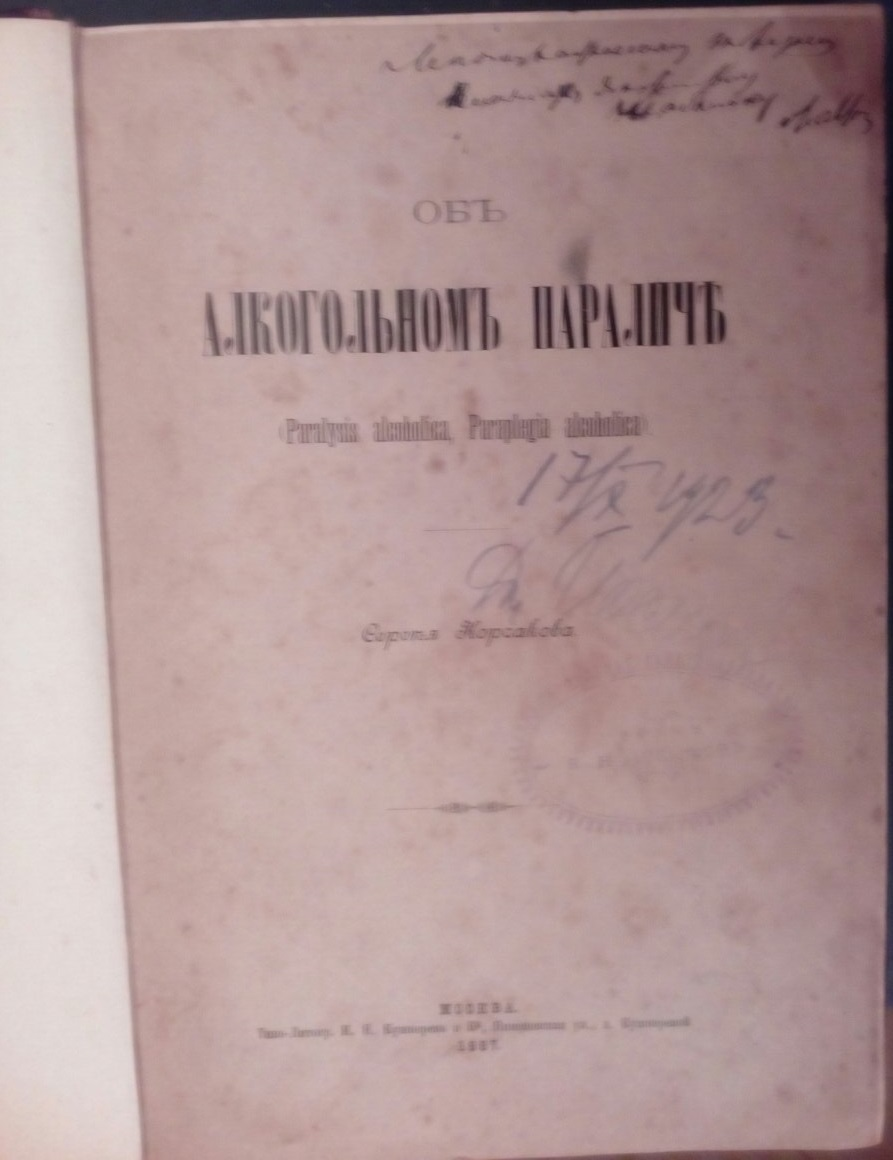
Ob alkogol’nom paraliche (Alcoholic Paralysis) - 1887

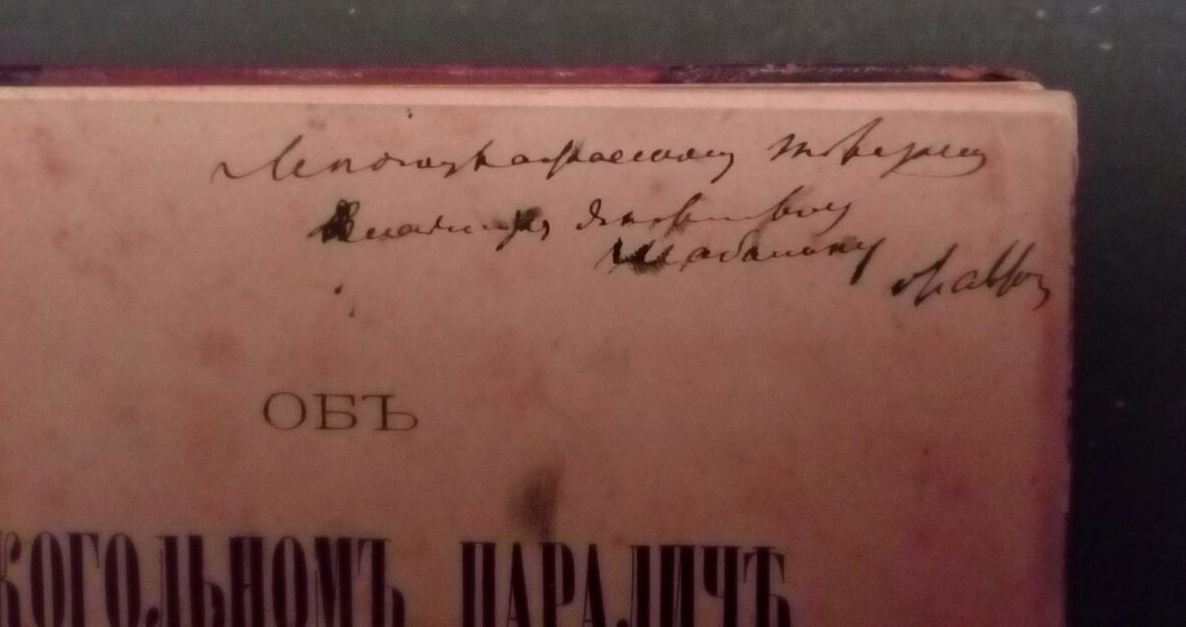
Ob alkogol’nom paraliche (Alcoholic Paralysis) - 1887 - author's dedication

== Career ==
In 1892, Korsakov was appointed professor extraordinarius at a new university psychiatric clinic. During this time, he visited Vienna, where he was a pupil of Theodor Meynert. He was ordinarius of neurology and psychiatry from 1899 until his death the next year. He died from heart failure at the age of 46.

== Legacy ==
Korsakov was one of the greatest neuropsychiatrists of the 19th century and published numerous works in neuropathology, psychiatry, and forensic medicine. Apart from his studies on alcoholic psychosis, he introduced the concept of paranoia and wrote an excellent textbook on psychiatry published in 1893. Additionally, he was a proponent of the non-restraint treatment in psychiatry. Korsakov studied the effects of alcoholism on the nervous system and drew attention to several cases of alcoholic polyneuropathy with distinctive mental symptoms (Korsakov's syndrome).

An able organiser, Korsakov was instrumental in founding the Moscow Society of Neuropathologists and Psychiatrists. The Korsakov Journal of Neurology and Psychiatry) is named after him.

According to a study conducted in 2015, Korsakov was included in "Russia team on medicine". This list includes fifty-three famous Russian medical scientists who were born between 1757 and 1950. Physicians of all specialities listed here. Among them were Vladimir Bekhterev, Vladimir Demikhov, Ivan Pavlov, Nikolay Pirogov, and Victor Skumin.

== Associated eponyms ==
- Korsakov's syndrome: Amnestic-confabulatory syndrome with three salient features (1) severe memory defect, especially for recent events; (2) confabulation (i.e., falsification of memory in an alert, responsive individual); and (3) polyneuropathy (psychosis polyneuritica), usually associated with alcoholism and malnutrition.
- Wernicke-Korsakov syndrome or Polioencephalitis haemorrhagica superior associated with Korsakov's psychosis: A condition characterized by nystagmus, ocular and Conjugate gaze palsy, ataxia and psychosis due to nutritional deficiency, more specifically of thiamine and observed mainly, though not exclusively, in alcoholics.

== Publications ==
- 1890 – Eine psychische Störung combiniert mit multipler Neuritis (Psychosis polyneuritica seu Cerebropathia psychica toxaemica)
- 1890 – Ueber eine besondere Form psychischer Störung, combiniert mit multipler Neuritis

== Sources ==
- "Корсаков, Сергей Сергеевич" . Brockhaus and Efron Encyclopedic Dictionary (in Russian). 1906.
