= Liverij Darkshevich =

Russian neurologist (1858–1925)

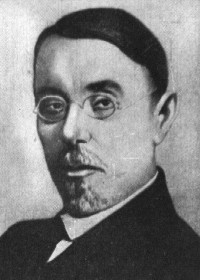
- Born: July 17, 1858; Yaroslavl, Russia
- Died: March 28, 1925 (aged 66); Moscow, Soviet Union
- Education: Doctor of Science (1887)
- Alma mater: Imperial Moscow University (1882)
- Scientific career
- Fields: Medicine
- Workplaces: Imperial Moscow University; Moscow State University
- Thesis: On the conductor of light stimulation from the retina of the eye to the oculomotor nerve

Liverij or Livery Osipovich Darkshevich (sometimes Darkschewitsch; Russian: Ливерий Осипович Даркшевич; 29 July [O.S. 17 July] 1858 – March 28, 1925) was a Russian neurologist who was a native of Yaroslavl.

== Life ==
From 1882 to 1887 he studied medicine at the University of Moscow, and afterwards worked and studied at the laboratory of Theodor Meynert (1833–1892) in Vienna, the laboratory of Paul Flechsig (1847–1929) in Leipzig, Karl Westphal's clinic in Berlin, and at the Salpêtrière in the clinic of Jean-Martin Charcot (1825–1893). During this time period, he also collaborated with Joseph Jules Dejerine (1839–1917) and Sigmund Freud (1856–1939) on a number of important medical papers.

From 1892 to 1917, Darkshevich was director of the department of neurology at the University of Kazan, where he founded a neurological clinic and laboratory. He was the first editor-in-chief of the Kazan Medical Journal (Russian: Казанский медицинский журнал). In 1917, he became a professor of neurological diseases at the University of Moscow.

He is remembered for his description of the nucleus of the posterior commissure, also known as the "nucleus of Darkshevich", defined as a cell group located in the central gray substance of the upper end of the cerebral aqueduct, in front of the oculomotor nucleus.
