= Pyotr Gannushkin =

Russian psychiatrist

Pyotr Borisovich Gannushkin
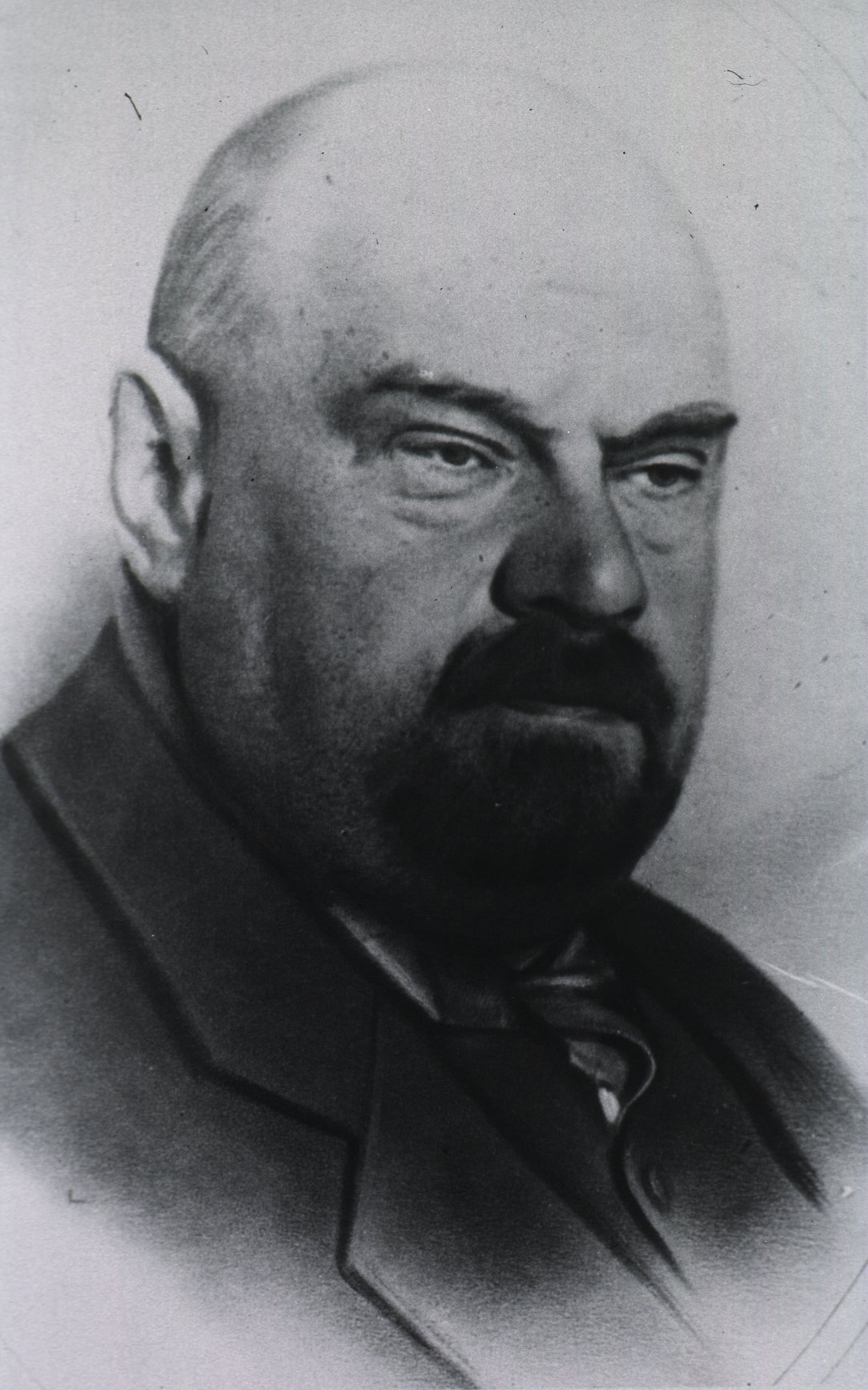
- Pyotr Borisovich Gannushkin circa 1930
- Born: 8 March 1875; Novosyolki (now known as Starozhilovsky District), Ryazan Governorate, Russian Empire
- Died: 23 February 1933 (aged 57); Moscow, USSR
- Resting place: Novodevichy Cemetery; Moscow
- Citizenship: Russian Empire (1875–1917); USSR (1917–1933)
- Education: Imperial Moscow University (1898)
- Known for: Classification of psychopathies; Triade of psychopathy; Schizoid reaction type; Epileptoid reaction type
- Spouse: Sofia Vladimirovna Gannuskina (née Klumova)
- Scientific career
- Fields: Psychiatry; Neuropsychiatry; Psychology
- Workplaces: 1. Lomonosov Moscow State University; 2. I.M. Sechenov First Moscow State Medical University; 3. S.S. Korsakov Clinic of Psychiatry at the I.M. Sechenov Moscow Medical Academy; 4. Alexeyev Psychiatric Hospital (Kashchenko Mental Hospital), Moscow
- Thesis: Paranoia acuta (1904)
- Doctoral advisor: Sergei Korsakoff
- Other academic advisors: Vladimir Serbsky; Sergei Sukhanov

Pyotr Borisovich Gannushkin (Russian: Пётр Бори́сович Га́ннушкин; March 8, 1875 – February 23, 1933) was a Russian psychiatrist who developed one of the first theories of psychopathies known today as personality disorders. He was a student of Sergei Korsakoff and Vladimir Serbsky. Not only did he manage to delineate certain organizational tasks of social psychiatry, but he also clearly formulated the main methodological aim of social psychiatrists, to combine methods of individual clinical analysis with sociological research and generalization.

== Formative Years ==
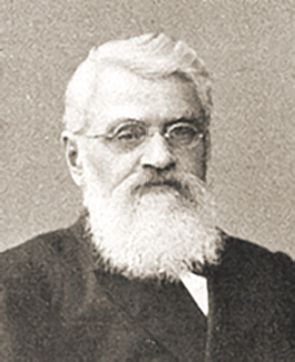
A pioneer of Russian psychiatry and advocate of humane treatment of the mentally insane, Aleksei Kozhevnikov founded the Moscow Society of Neuropathologists and Psychiatrists in 1890. "Kozhevnikov's epilepsy," also known as epilepsia partialis continua, is named after him.

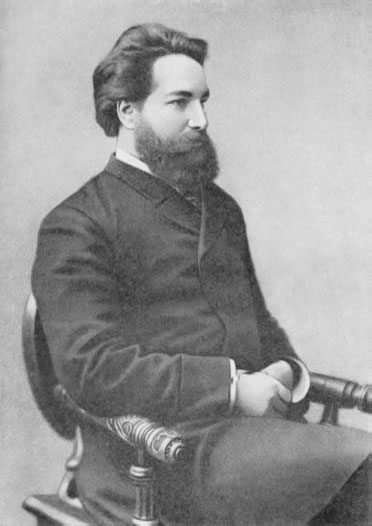
Sergei Korsakoff was known for his studies on alcoholic psychosis. He introduced the concept of paranoia and wrote an excellent textbook on psychiatry. His name is given to Korsakoff's syndrome and Wernicke–Korsakoff syndrome.

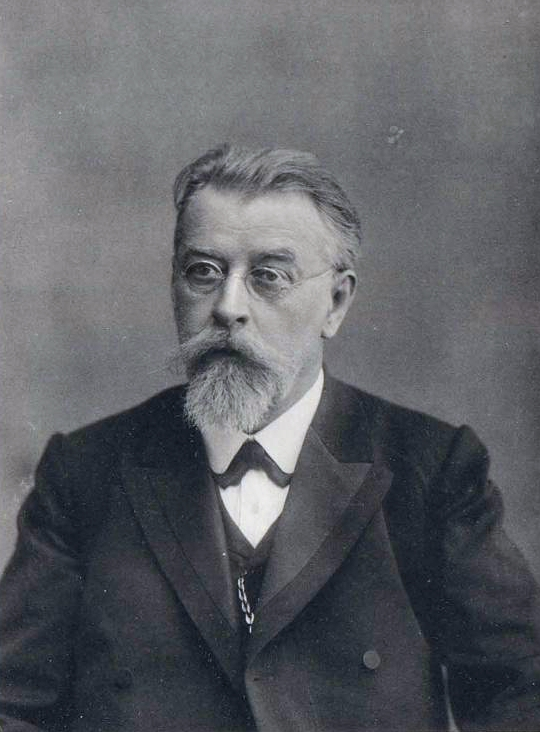
Vladimir Serbsky was one of the founders of the forensic psychiatry in Russia. Author of Forensic Psychopathology, Serbsky thought delinquency had no congenital diatheses, being the result of social causes.

=== Early life and education ===
Pyotr Borisovich Gannushkin was born in the Russian Empire in 1875 in the village of Novosyolki in the Pronsk district of the Ryazan Governorate (the present-day Ryazan Oblast). His father Boris was a physician, a compassionate and precise man. His mother Olga (née Mozharova) came of an impoverished Russian landed family. Well-bred and educated, she was fluent in French and German, interested in philosophy, and fond of music, poetry and art. She was, moreover, a gregarious and kind-hearted woman.

In his early years, Pyotr was educated by his mother. After a while, the family moved to Ryazan, the regional capital, where his father started teaching at a high school for boys. Soon after his 9th birthday, the young Gannushkin enrolled at the same school. An excellent student, Pyotr was always sociable, honest, and inclined to irony; he nursed a dislike for severe discipline. During his school years, he edited his own home journal.

Gannushkin's sister Maria noted in her memoirs that Pyotr never told anyone which profession he intended to pursue. When he turned 13, however, Gannushkin's keen interest in "personology" and human mentality became apparent. It was then that he read Sechenov's 1863 monograph "Brain Reflexes", a successful attempt to describe the physiological mechanisms of mental activity.

=== University years ===
In 1893 Gannushkin graduated from the high school with a gold medal, the highest award, and entered the department of medicine at Moscow State University. In his third year of studies, he finally decided to become a psychiatrist after being influenced by such university professors as Aleksei Kozhevnikov and Sergei Korsakoff.

All the students, including Gannushkin, were fascinated by the way Korsakoff interacted with the mentally disabled. As Korsakoff explained, "mental patients should not be regarded as soulless creatures: they should be considered personalities familiar to everyone who is somehow related to them."

In addition to attending lectures and recitals during his university years, Gannushkin served as an orderly with the responsibilities of a junior medical staff member.

== Career and Biography ==
Gannushkin graduated from Moscow University in October 1898. He turned down a proposal to become a permanent resident physician, because it then included superintendent's responsibilities. During the next years, up to 1902, he was a non-resident of the psychiatric hospital. He worked in the outpatient clinic and wrote a variety of scholarly works.

In 1901, for example the French journal Medico Psychological Annals (French: Annales médico-psychologiques) he published a monograph called "Voluptuousness, cruelty and religion" (French: La volupté, la cruauté et la religion), which was subsequently banned in Russia. In it Gannushkin emphasized the close relation between religiosity, sexuality, and cruelty, using the example of Ivan the Terrible as an illustration. In many cases religious fanatics demonstrated cruelty, wrote Gannushkin, and vice versa, i.e. many cruel people were religious.

In 1902, at the suggestion of Sukhanov, Serbsky, and Rossolimo, Gannushkin was made a full member of the Moscow Society of Neuropathologists and Psychiatrists (Russian: Московское общество невропатологов и психиатров). At the same time, he was elected a supernumerary assistant at the psychiatric hospital headed by Serbsky, after Korsakoff's early death from heart failure.

=== Collaboration with Sergei Sukhanov ===
Korsakoff's assistant Sergei Sukhanov was willing to help young physicians, fostering them in word and in deed. Sukhanov was a proponent of the nosological approach. He demonstrated a remarkable power of observation. Borderline psychiatry, especially psychopathies and psychogenies, was among his main research interests. His inclination towards synthesis led Sukhanov to note both the scientific and social importance of this problem.

Sukhanov managed to stir Gannushkin's interest in these issues and the two developed friendly relations, publishing six research papers together. They preferred to study individual mental disorders rather than their mixed types, believing that this approach would contribute to the study of acknowledged diseases, the discovery of new mental disorders, and the development of psychiatric taxonomy. Sukhanov and Gannushkin distinguished a particular form of obsession and were the first to show the process whereby, at least in some cases, obsessions were transformed into schizophrenia.

=== Acute paranoia (1904) ===
In 1904, Gannushkin submitted his thesis on "Acute paranoia" (Russian: Острая паранойя). It took the form of a sketch of the historical development of the theory of acute paranoia. The thesis opened with a description of the research of Vincenzo Chiarugi and Jean-Étienne Dominique Esquirol. The focus then shifted to works by Wilhelm Griesinger, Bénédict Morel, and Karl Friedrich Otto Westphal. Next Gannushkin presented observations made by Sergei Korsakoff, Vladimir Serbsky, Emil Kraepelin, and Eugen Bleuler. Finally Gannushkin gave a brilliant exposition of his own findings about paranoia.

After his thesis was accepted and approved, Gannushkin became a privat dozent (i.e. freelance university lecturer) of the Department of Mental Disorders in the Moscow State University. It was then that he began to deliver his course of lectures on "The Theory of Pathological Characters" (Russian: Учение о патологических характерах).

In 1905, Gannushkin attended courses in postgraduate psychiatry at Kraepelin's clinic in Munich. Thereafter he became a proponent of Kraepelin's theory. The following year, Gannushkin visited St. Anne's Psychiatric Hospital (French: Hôpital Sainte-Anne) in Paris, where he familiarized himself with the work of Valentin Magnan, an influential figure in French psychiatry. In 1908 and in 1911 Gannushkin again attended postgraduate psychiatry courses at Kraepelin's clinic.

=== Resignation (1911) and post-Revolutionary career ===
In 1911 university autonomy became a crucial issue in Russia, leading to repressive measures by the Tsar's protégé Lev Kasso, the education minister. In 1911, together with other progressive scholars and scientists, Gannushkin left the university in protest. From 1906 until 1914, when he was drafted into the army, he worked as a resident physician at the Moscow Alexeyev Psychiatric Hospital (Russian: Московская Алексеевская психиатрическая больница), known today as the Kashchenko Mental Hospital (Russian: больница имени П. П. Кащенко). During this period Gannushkin and others set up a first-class research journal, The Korsakoff Journal of Neuropathology and Psychiatry (Russian: Журнал невропатологии и психиатрии имени Корсакова).

In 1917, after being discharged from the army for health reasons, Gannushkin returned in the Moscow Alexeyev Psychiatric Hospital. From 1918 onwards he was a professor in the Department of Psychiatry at the Moscow State University (from 1930 he was professor at the I.M. Sechenov First Moscow State Medical University) and director at the University Psychiatric Hospital: today this is known as the Korsakov Clinic of Psychiatry at the Sechenov Moscow Medical Academy (Russian: Клиника имени С. С. Корсакова АМН России имени И. М. Сеченова).

=== Some other aspects of his work ===
Gannushkin was one of the first psychiatrists to talk about the schizoid reaction type, the somatogenic and psychogenic reactions of schizoids.

In 1927, he identified the "epileptoid reaction type", which is usually characterized by repeated temporary reactions caused by the influence of psychogenic factors and unfavorable situations. This reaction type is expressed by symptoms of dysphoria, i.e. malicious actions combined with anger, anguish, and fear. In many ways, this reaction type is akin to the behavior pattern typical for borderline personality disorder. As a psychotic episode, such reactions could happen during epidemic encephalitis, cerebral atherosclerosis, and brain injury.

Gannushkin also took part in the experimental study of hypnosis. He criticized Lombroso's theory of crime.

Gannushkin was interested in psychoanalytical ideas, and made experimental use of psychoanalytic therapy. His stance on psychoanalysis is outlined in his "On Psychotherapy and Psychoanalysis" (Russian: О психотерапии и психоанализе). Not a committed proponent of Freud's theory, Gannushkin did believe that under certain conditions psychoanalytical methods could be used as part of the process of treatment.

Gannushkin regarded war and revolution as a "traumatic epidemic" affecting the entire population. There is a reciprocal influence, he used to say, between the mentality of the population and its life in society.

Under Gannushkin's direction a new form of medical care for people with mental disorders was created in Russia. He helped to organise a network of psychoneurological out-patient clinics in the USSR. He worked on issues linked to the teaching of psychiatry and the prevention of mental illness.

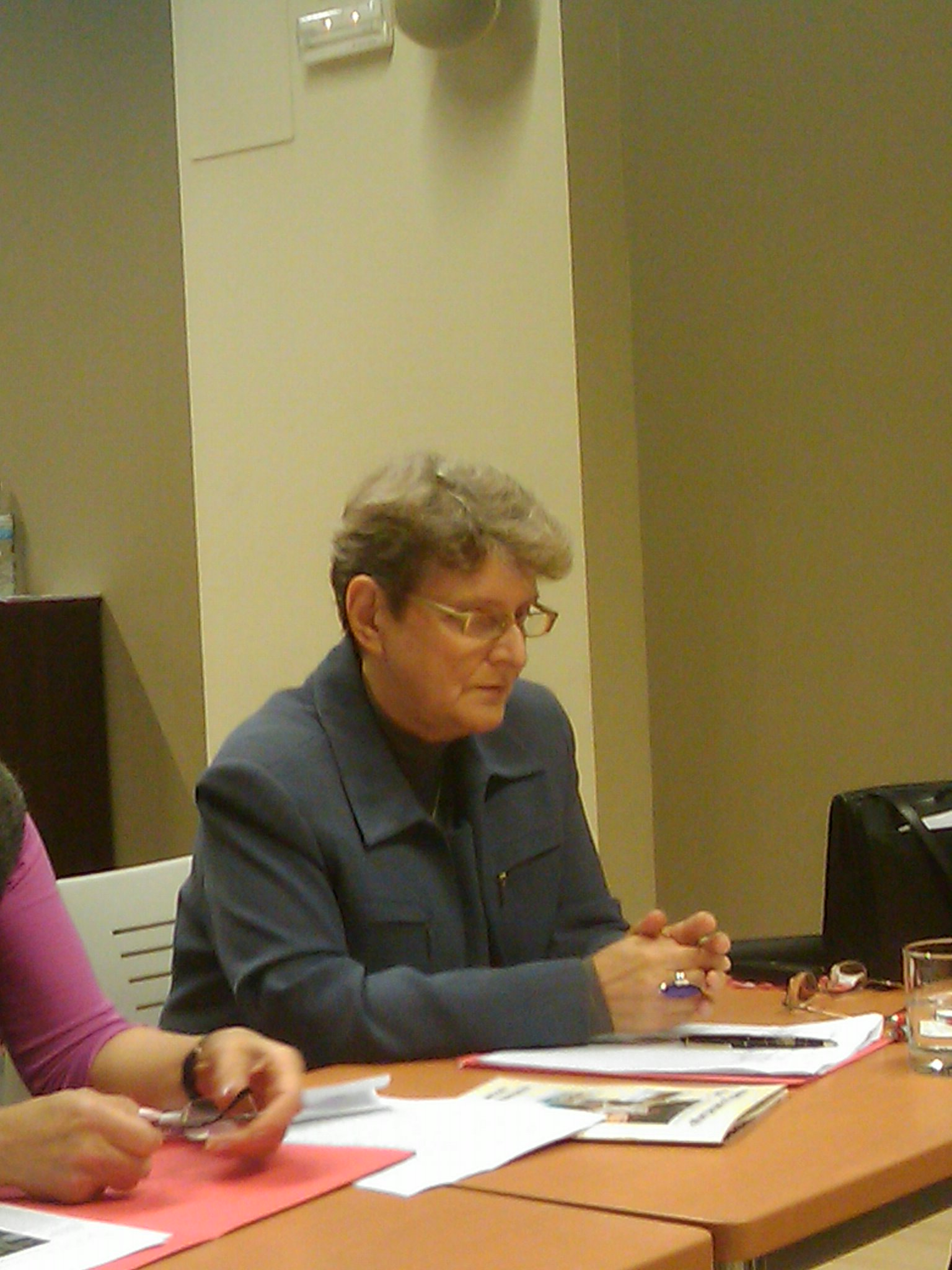
Gannushkin's granddaughter Svetlana Gannushkina, mathematician and noted human rights activist.

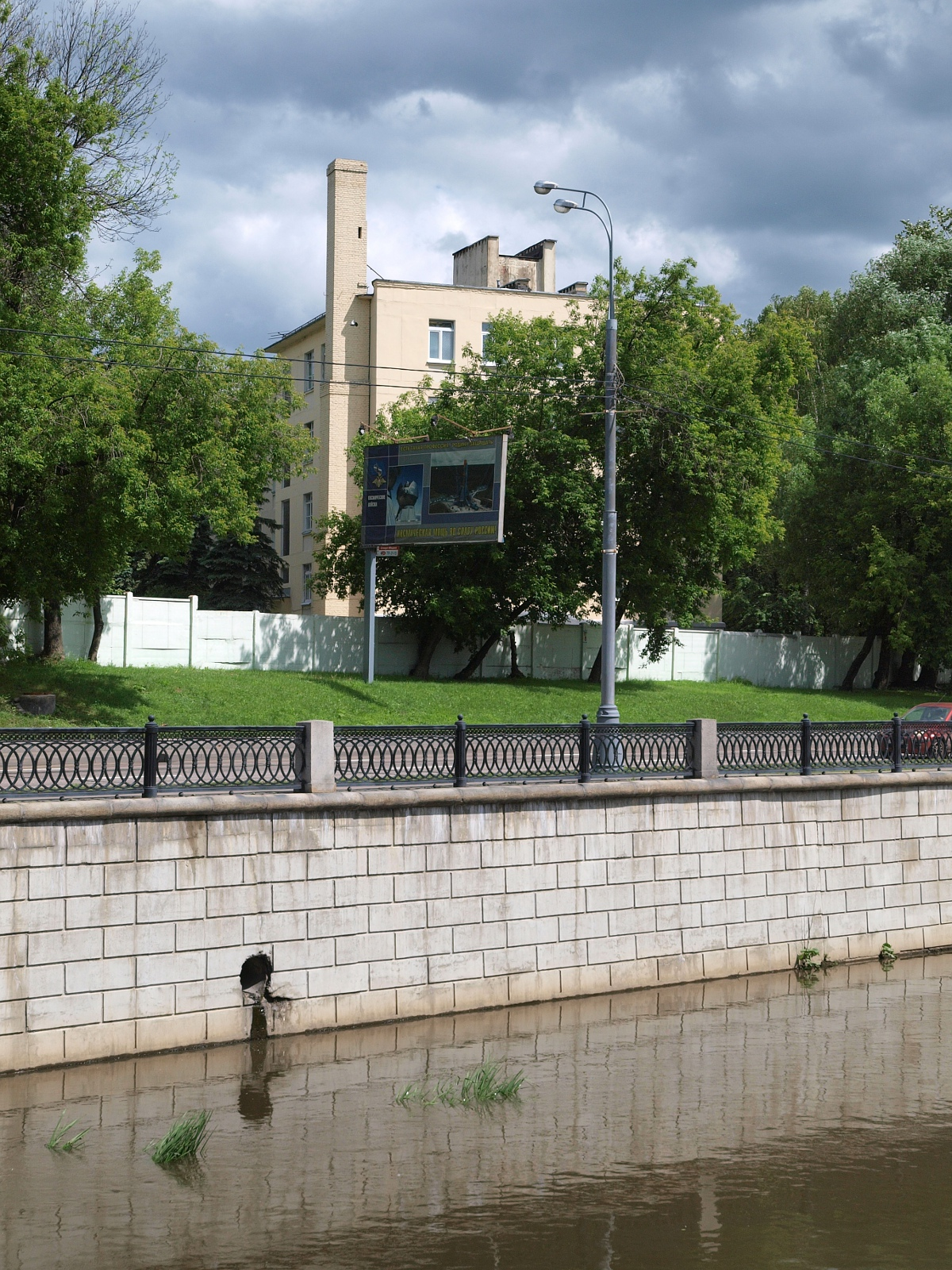
A Moscow river embankment is named after Pyotr B. Gannushkin.

=== Marriage, son and grand-daughter ===
Pyotr Borisovich Gannushkin married the pianist Sofia Vladimirovna Klumova (1880-1945). They had one son Alexey Petrovich Gannushkin (1920-1974) who was an aircraft design engineer, USSR State Prize Laureate, and father of Svetlana Gannushkina (b. 1943).

Svetlana Alexeyevna Gannushkina is a mathematician and human rights activist, working particularly to help immigrants and refugees through the Civic Assistance NGO. (She was reported to be a serious contender for the 2010 Nobel Peace Prize.) A professor of mathematics at the Historical Archives Institute between 1970 and 1999, Gannushkina was a member of the presidential Council for the Development of Civil Society Institutions and Human Rights until her resignation in June 2012.

=== Personality and views on psychiatry ===
Gannushkin was a modest and diffident man and he disliked public speaking. When attending psychiatric conferences, he preferred to stay in the background. Only among fellow scientists and when lecturing to his senior students was Gannushkin able to speak his mind. An experienced clinician, he was a proponent of the natural science method who considered himself an enemy of pompous and meretricious declamation.

Gannushkin's power of observation was enhanced by his erudition and ability to discern the most useful points in a variety of different monographs and articles. He recorded each new thought and accurately gathered all required materials. His lectures and clinical vignettes show how carefully he scrutinized and systematized all the research data he was working with.

As L.A. Prozorov commented: "Gannushkin could stir the interest of young people in research, even if it was crude; he sought out and selected research scientists." Remembering her husband, Sophia Gannushkina said, "Once he decided to do something, he grew fearless."

Throughout his life, Gannushkin believed that psychiatry and our life in society are closely connected. To him a psychiatrist was primarily a community worker. That is why, perhaps, he made psychopathies his main research subject.

"Our generation does not limit itself to psychiatric hospitals. Using the same approach, we visit schools, barracks, and prisons. We are not looking for those who need to be hospitalized, but for the half-normal, borderline types, those who represent intermediate steps. Borderline psychiatry, minor psychiatry... - here is a motto for our times, an area to which our actions must be directed in the immediate future."

=== Death and influence ===
While Gannushkin was finishing his seminal work on the Manifestations of psychopathies: their statics, dynamics and systematic aspects (Russian: Клиника психопатий, их статика, динамика, систематика), his health quickly deteriorated. After long hesitation he agreed to undergo the proposed operation. The best Russian surgeons and physicians tried to save him, but he died on 23 February 1933. Before his death he managed to read his monograph after proofreading and approve it for publication. The book appeared that year following his death.

Research papers written by Gannushkin and his followers represent a landmark in the theory of psychopathies in Russia. Among Russian psychiatrists, it was Gannushkin who developed the most accurate definition of various psychopathies (personality disorders). Gannushkin had many followers, among who it is possible to distinguish three generations.

The first generation of disciples was formed of colleagues who worked under his direction: D.A. Amenitsky, I.N. Vvedensky, T.A. Geyer, V.A. Grombakh, M.O. Gurevich, P.M. Zinovyev, E.K. Krasnushkin, L.A. Prozorov, L.M. Rezenstein, M.Y. Serieysky, T.I. Yudin. The second generation was made up of Gannushkin's senior students: B.A. Belousov, A.G. Galachyan, F.F. Detengor, S.G. Zhislin, A.N. Zalmanov, M.Z. Kaplinsky, R.E. Lusternik, N.S. Molodenkov, A.N. Molokhov, N.I. Ozeretsky, D.S. Ozeretskovsky, T.P. Simpson, Y.A. Florenskaya, B.D. Fridman, Y.P. Frumkin, A.O. Edelstein. A third generation included his junior students (A.P. Alexandrova, A.M. Dubinin, O.V. Kerbikov, S.V. Krayts, A.Y. Levinson, D.E. Melekhov, V.M. Morozov, A.I. Ponomoryov, B.A. Famin, P.D. Fridman, Y.D. Shulman). Together, Gannushkin's followers made significant contributions to the development of psychiatry in Russia.

In 1933, the Health Care Commissariat's Research Institute of Neuropsychiatric Treatment established an annual Gannushkin award. In 1936, Moscow's Psychiatric Hospital No.4 was named after Gannushkin (Russian: Психиатрическая клиническая больница № 4 им. П.Б. Ганнушкина). Later a Gannushkin memorial museum was created inside the hospital. A river embankment in Moscow was also renamed in his honor.

Gannushkin was immortalised in fiction as Professor Titanushkin, a character in Ilf and Petrov's satirical novel The Little Golden Calf (1931).

== The theory of psychopathies ==
Pyotr Borisovich Gannushkin divided psychiatry into two principal categories: major psychiatric conditions, such as schizophrenia, bipolar disorder, etc., and minor psychiatric conditions (the psychopathies or personality disorders). The theory of psychopathies or "pathological characters" is regarded as Gannushkin's main contribution to the discipline.

In Manifestations of psychopathies: statics, dynamics, systematic aspects (1933), Gannushkin distinguished two types of pathological development: constitutional and situational. The situational development of psychopathy is evidently caused by trauma or distress: its onset is always marked by some serious mental change, after which everything becomes more or less static. While the statics of psychopathies refer to the actual substance of the subject, noted Gannushkin, the dynamics of psychopathies indicate the types, laws, and developmental schemes of psychopathies.

Gannushkin did not consider psychopathies to be progressive mental states and contrasted them with serious mental disorders that caused retardation. Borderline psychiatry, he was at pains to emphasise, includes a wide range of different transitional steps and transient mental states. He acknowledged that psychopaths (i.e. those with borderline and antisocial personality disorders) have made substantial contributions to science, scholarship, art, and literature.

Gannushkin delineated the three main signs of behavioral pathology that underlie psychopathies:

- maladaptation
- ubiquity
- stability

Typology of psychopathies by Pyotr Borisovich Gannushkin
Cluster		Description	Possible DSM/ICD equivalent type(s)	Possible Millon equivalent subtype(s)		
I. Cluster of cycloids (Russian: Группа циклоидов)	Constitutionally depressive (Russian: Конституционально депрессивные)	chronically lowered mood; pessimistic worldview; viewing life as meaningless; avoidance of close relationships due to excessive sensitivity; a penchant for dark ruminations; a high risk of suicide	Depressive personality disorder. Can be combined with some avoidant, dependent, and masochistic features Dysthymia	Restive, self-derogating or morbid depressive personality		
I. Cluster of cycloids (Russian: Группа циклоидов)	Constitutionally excitable (Russian: Конституционально возбуждённые)	constantly elevated mood; vigor and enterprise; flexibility and multifacetedness; superficiality of interests; overtalkativeness; excessive demand for amusement	Histrionic personality disorder with some narcissistic features Hypomania	Vivacious histrionic personality		
I. Cluster of cycloids (Russian: Группа циклоидов)	Cyclothymics (Russian: Циклотимики)	repeated undulating mood swings; simultaneous presence of both hypomanic and dysthymic features (in unequal proportions); seasonal dependence; an onset in adolescence (in most cases)	Cyclothymia	n.a.		
I. Cluster of cycloids (Russian: Группа циклоидов)	Emotionally labile or reactively labile psychopaths (Russian: Эмотивно-лабильные или реактивно-лабильные психопаты)	extremely quick mood swings; childishness and naivety; tenderness and fragility; high suggestibility; a penchant for emotional attachment	Borderline personality disorder with some depressive or masochistic features	Self-destructive borderline personality		
II. Cluster of asthenics (Russian: Группа астеников)	Asthenics (Russian: Астеники)	excessive neuropsychic excitement combined with irritability; fatiguability and exhaustiveness; timidity and doubtfulness; a penchant for hypochondria; chronically lowered mood; social phobia	Avoidant personality disorder. Some dependent and negativistic features can also be present	Conflicted or phobic avoidant personality		
II. Cluster of asthenics (Russian: Группа астеников)	Psychasthenics (Russian: Психастеники)	extreme indecisiveness, shyness, and bashfulness; preoccupation with potential future danger; a penchant for introspection, self-absorption; excessive susceptibility; poor health, which includes motor awkwardness	Obsessive-compulsive personality disorder with some dependent features	Conscientious obsessive-compulsive personality		
III. Cluster of schizoids (Russian: Группа шизоидов)	Schizoids (Russian: Шизоиды)	detachment from the world; eccentricity and paradoxicality of emotional life and behavior; emotional coldness and dryness; unpredictability combined with lack of intuition; ambivalence (e.g., simultaneous presence of both stubbornness and submissiveness)	Schizoid personality disorder. Can be combined with some schizotypal, avoidant, and compulsive features	Remote, depersonalized or affectless schizoid personality		
III. Cluster of schizoids (Russian: Группа шизоидов)	Dreamers (Russian: Мечтатели)	detachment from the world; tenderness and fragility; receptiveness to beauty; weak-willedness and listlessness; luxuriant imagination and dereism; usually inflated self-concept	A mix of schizoid, narcissistic, and histrionic features. Both schizotypal and avoidant features can also be present	schizotypal		
IV. Cluster of paranoiacs (Russian: Группа параноиков)	Paranoiacs (Russian: Параноики)	preoccupation with fixed ideas; shallow-mindedness; egotism, egocentrism, self-absorption, and self-complacence; one-way affectivity; high suspiciousness, stubbornness, paltriness, and rancor	Paranoid personality disorder. Can be combined with some compulsive, narcissistic, negativistic, and sadistic features	Obdurate, fanatic, querulous or malignant paranoid personality		
IV. Cluster of paranoiacs (Russian: Группа параноиков)	Fanatics (Russian: Фанатики)	devotedness to fixed ideas (there are many fanatics among the leaders of destructive religious cults); shallow-mindedness; strong-willedness, will of adamant; purposefulness, consistency of aim; manipulative behavior	Obsessive-compulsive personality disorder with some paranoid features	Puritanical obsessive-compulsive personality		
V. Cluster of epileptoids (Russian: Группа эпилептоидов)		extreme irritability causing bursts of anger; a penchant for dysphoria (maliciousness combined with anger, anguish, and fear); shallow-mindedness; egotism, vigor, fixedness, exactingness, and rigidity; strong antisocial attitudes; a high risk of suicide	Antisocial personality disorder usually combined with some borderline features	Covetous antisocial personality Impulsive borderline personality		
VI. Cluster of hysterical characters (Russian: Группа истерических характеров)	Hysterical personalities (Russian: Истерические личности)	attention seeking behavior combined with fear of indifference, an ardent desire to be not like all the others; appearance consciousness; the absence of objective truth in relation both to themselves and those around them; histrionics, theatricalism, deceitfulness; weak-willedness combined with superficial, capricious, and unstable emotions	Histrionic personality disorder. Can be combined with some dependent and negativistic features	Theatrical, appeasing or tempestuous histrionic personality		
VI. Cluster of hysterical characters (Russian: Группа истерических характеров)	Pathological liars (Russian: Патологические лгуны)	prominent social defects, which includes extreme slovenliness; attention seeking and manipulative behavior; appearance consciousness; excessively excitable, immature, and rich imagination; high eloquence; involvement in fraud, charlatanism, crooked gambling	Histrionic personality disorder with some antisocial features Narcissistic personality disorder with some antisocial features Borderline personality disorder with some antisocial features	Disingenous histrionic personality Unprincipled narcissistic personality Impulsive borderline personality		
VII. Cluster of unstable psychopaths (Russian: Группа неустойчивых психопатов)		a penchant for addiction, inclination to drug abuse; weak character and superficiality; indolence and vagrancy (they usually end up at the bottom of the heap); exposure to malignant social influence; mediocrity, averageness	Haltlose personality disorder, Antisocial Personality Disorder with some schizoid and avoidant features Borderline personality disorder with some negativistic features	Nomadic antisocial personality Petulant borderline personality		
VIII. Cluster of malignant narcissistic psychopaths (Russian: Группа антисоциальных психопатов)		strongly pronounced moral defects and a lack of conscience; emotional instability and dysregulation; oscillating between hypersexuality, promiscuity, positive affect and sudden shifts into depression, despair, self-harm, and suicidality.; indifference to praise and criticism; deceitfulness combined with listlessness; a penchant for oblectation of the senses and torment	Antisocial personality disorder combined with some paranoid and Machiavellian features. Sometimes schizoid features can also be present	Malevolent antisocial personality	Borderline personality disorder with seductive and sociopathic traits and features. Sadism is common in this cluster with a high incidence of paraphilias, often podophilia, voyeurism, transvestic fetishism (Cross-dressing), urolagnia/water sports/golden showers, pedophilia, pederasty.	Malevolent borderline personality
IX. Cluster of constitutionally stupid (Russian: Группа конституционально глупых)		high conformity (extremely influenced by public opinion); excessive suggestibility; lack of originality; stereotypeness and conventionalism	Dependent personality disorder. Some masochistic and depressive features can also be present	Immature, accommodating or selfless dependent personality		

Some elements of Gannushkin's typology were later incorporated into a theory developed by Andrey Yevgenyevich Lichko, another Russian psychiatrist interested in personality disorders together with their milder forms, the "accentuations of character" (Russian: акцентуации характера).

== Bibliography ==
Taken as a whole, Gannushkin's bibliography includes three monographs, 19 articles, nine introductory notes for monographs and anthologies, and approximately 100 reviews.

Russian	Title in English
Суханов С. А., Ганнушкин П. Б. Прогрессивный паралич по данным Московской психиатрической клиники. — 1901.	Sukhanov, S.A. & Gannushkin, P.B., "Progressive supranuclear palsy according to data from the Moscow Psychiatric Clinic", 1901.
Суханов С. А., Ганнушкин П. Б. К вопросу о значении мышечного валика у душевнобольных. — 1901.	Sukhanov, S.A. & Gannushkin, P.B., "On the meaning of muscular embankment in people with mental disorders", 1901.
Ганнушкин П. Б. Сладострастие, жестокость и религия. — 1901.	Gannushkin, P.B., "Voluptuousness, cruelty and religion", Annales médico-psychologiques, 1901.
Суханов С. А., Ганнушкин П. Б. К учению о навязчивых идеях. — 1902.	Sukhanov, S.A. & Gannushkin, P.B., "On the theory of obsessions", 1902.
Суханов С. А., Ганнушкин П. Б. К учению о меланхолии. — 1902.	Sukhanov, S.A. & Gannushkin, P.B., "On the theory of melancholy", 1902.
Суханов С. А., Ганнушкин П. Б. К учению о мании. — 1902.	Sukhanov, S.A. & Gannushkin, P.B., "On the theory of mania", 1902.
Суханов С. А., Ганнушкин П. Б. О циркулярном психозе и циркулярном течении. — 1903.	Sukhanov, S.A. & Gannushkin, P.B., "On circular psychosis and circular course", 1903.
Ганнушкин П. Б. Острая паранойя, клиническая сторона вопроса. — 1904.	Gannushkin, P.B., Acute paranoia: clinical aspects, St Petersburg, 1904.
Ганнушкин П. Б. Резонирующее помешательство и резонёрство. — 1905.	Gannushkin, P.B., "Tangential insanity and tangentiality", 1905.
Ганнушкин П. Б. Психастенический характер. — 1907.	Gannushkin, P.B., "Psychasthenic character", 1907.
Ганнушкин П. Б. Об эпилептоидном типе реакции. — 1927.	Gannushkin, P.B., "On the epileptoid reaction type", 1907.
Ганнушкин П. Б. Клиника психопатий, их статика, динамика, систематика. — 1933.	Gannushkin, P.B., Manifestations of psychopathies: statics, dynamics, systematic aspects, 1933.
Ганнушкин П. Б. Клиника малой психиатрии. — 1933.	Gannushkin, P.B., "Clinical manifestations in mild psychiatric syndromes", 1933.
Ганнушкин П. Б. Избранные труды. — 1964.	Gannushkin, P.B., Selected works, 1964.

== See also ==
- Theodore Millon (1928-2014) — a researcher of psychopathies, now known as personality disorders.
- Andrey Yevgenyevich Lichko (1926-1994) — a researcher interested in personality disorders along with their milder forms, the so-called accentuations of character.
