= The Psychiatrist =

The Psychiatrist may refer to:

- "The Psychiatrist" (Dynasty), an episode of Dynasty
- "The Psychiatrist" (Fawlty Towers), an episode of Fawlty Towers
- The Psychiatrist (journal)
- The Psychiatrist (TV series)
- O alienista or The Psychiatrist, a novella by Machado de Assis

== See also ==
- Psychiatrist (disambiguation)
