= Haltlose personality disorder =

Historical personality disorder category listed in ICD-10

- Other names: Haltlose psychopathy, willenlose psychopathy, unstable psychopath, unstable drifter, disinhibited personality
- Specialty: Psychiatry

Haltlose personality disorder (also haltlose psychopathy, from German: haltlos, lit. 'without hold, unstable') is a personality disorder category that originated in early twentieth-century German psychiatry and was used chiefly in German-speaking, Russian-speaking and, to a lesser extent, French-speaking countries. It is listed by name as an inclusion term under "other specific personality disorders" (F60.8) in ICD-10 and in national adaptations of it, including the German ICD-10-GM, the Russian adaptation and the American ICD-10-CM (code F60.89), all of which remain in clinical use; but it has never been given diagnostic criteria in any classification, was not carried into ICD-11, and has never appeared in the DSM. In English-language texts it was occasionally rendered as the "unstable psychopath" or "unstable drifter", but the concept was never widely adopted in British or American clinical practice, and published instances of its use as a diagnosis in the twenty-first century are rare.

The term was introduced by Emil Kraepelin in the early 1900s to describe one of his types of "psychopathic personality": people characterised by a lack of persistence, marked suggestibility, impulsive pursuit of immediate pleasure, and an inability to pursue long-term goals or to learn from the consequences of their behaviour. The type was retained in the influential typology of Kurt Schneider and in Soviet psychiatry, where it was known as the "unstable" (неустойчивый) type.

The diagnosis was closely associated with criminology, forensic psychiatry and youth welfare in the first half of the twentieth century. In Germany it became entangled with eugenic and hereditarian theories of crime, and in Switzerland Haltlosigkeit was among the grounds on which adults could be detained without trial under the system of administrative detention that operated until 1981. The category was still being used in Russian adolescent psychiatric research published in 2010. Historians of psychiatry have argued that many of the adults Kraepelin described as haltlos would today be diagnosed with attention deficit hyperactivity disorder, and modern commentators regard the construct's other features as distributed across the antisocial, borderline and histrionic personality disorders.

== Terminology ==
The German adjective haltlos describes a person without inner "hold" or footing: unsteady, aimless and lacking self-restraint. Haltlose is the feminine form of the adjective, agreeing with the German noun for personality (Persönlichkeit), and die Haltlosen was used as a collective noun for the patients so described. In the German psychiatry of the period, "psychopath" (Psychopath) meant any person with an abnormal personality and did not carry the narrower forensic meaning the word has acquired in English.

Several related terms circulated alongside it. Kurt Schneider preferred willenlos ("will-less"), placing the emphasis on a deficiency of volition rather than of self-control; Eugen Kahn objected that this was a misnomer, since the patients in his view had ample "will" but could not translate it into sustained action. The jurist Edmund Mezger observed in 1949 that Schneider, from the standpoint of individual psychology, called them willenlose psychopaths, whereas he himself, taking a sociological view, kept what he called the usual designation, Haltlose. In Russian-language psychiatry the equivalent category was the "unstable psychopath" or "unstable type". The World Health Organization's Lexicon of Psychiatric and Mental Health Terms listed "haltlose personality" and treated "disinhibited personality" as a near-synonym, and the Russian adaptation of ICD-10 renders the F60.8 inclusion term as "disinhibited ('unrestrained') personality" (расторможенная («безудержная»)) rather than "unstable".

English-language usage has always been sparse. A short exchange of letters in the Psychiatric Bulletin in 1998–2000, prompted by a reader's query about the meaning of the term in ICD-10, noted that it was little known even among British psychiatrists, although it was still defined in standard German reference works of the 1980s. The Canadian government's terminology bank records "unstable drifter" as a term for which no standard French equivalent could be supplied.

== Historical clinical description ==
The following summarises how the type was described by the psychiatrists who used it. No agreed criteria ever existed, and the descriptions reflect the assumptions and moral vocabulary of early- and mid-twentieth-century psychiatry; they should be read as a record of what clinicians of the period meant by the term rather than as validated findings.

=== Kraepelin ===
In the seventh edition of Kraepelin's Psychiatrie the Haltlosen, glossed by Crocq as the irresolute or weak-willed who are unable to apply themselves to sustained and long-term work, were one of four types of psychopathic personality, alongside the "born criminal", the pathological liars and swindlers, and the pseudoquerulants; the eighth edition (1915) expanded the list to seven types and retained them. Kraepelin also discussed them in his lectures of 1905; his assistant Gustav Aschaffenburg also wrote on the type. He portrayed them as superficially amiable, quick to learn but unable to apply or retain knowledge, prone to changing occupations and residences, and governed by whatever impulse or external influence was nearest at hand; he noted a tendency to "senseless journeys" and to vagabondage, and held that only lifelong wanderlust of this kind was characteristic, a point on which Kahn later disagreed, observing that many lost the urge to wander with age and settled into an unremarkable life. Kraepelin believed the disposition was constitutional but shaped by upbringing and social circumstances. According to Steinberg and Strauß's analysis of his textbook, he reported that about half of the patients he classed as haltlos came from homes marked by parental alcoholism or personality disorder, and he estimated that roughly two-thirds of the men and a fifth of the women he saw went on to alcohol dependence; he associated the type with debt, petty crime and social decline.

=== German typologies of the 1920s–1950s ===
The type was taken up by August Homburger, Franz Kramer, Eugen Kahn, Karl Birnbaum and Kurt Schneider, among others, often in the context of child and adolescent "psychopath welfare" (Psychopathenfürsorge). Schneider included the Willenlosen as one of the ten types in his Die psychopathischen Persönlichkeiten (1923), which remained the standard German typology for decades. He described them as lacking resistance to influence of any kind, and regarded their prognosis as poor, considering that they could be managed only by external structure and sanction rather than by education or psychotherapy. Karl Jaspers adopted the type in his General Psychopathology, characterising it as a complete absence of willpower in people who simply echo whatever influence reaches them.

Estimates of how common the type was among "psychopaths" varied widely between authors, from well under 10 per cent to around 20 per cent, reflecting the absence of any agreed criteria. A 1968 German study found that it rarely occurred in isolation and was usually recorded alongside other diagnoses.

=== Characteristics as described ===
Across these authors the defining feature was an inability to sustain any purpose. The haltlose child or adolescent was said to appear strong-willed and even ambitious in pursuing immediate wishes, so that the absence of perseverance only became apparent later, when caretakers were puzzled by behaviour that contradicted the earlier impression. Ewald observed in 1924 that pronounced suggestibility could coexist with episodes of rigid obstinacy, and that such people were not to be trusted in positions of leadership even though they could behave well under good leadership themselves. Kramer held that the condition worsened whenever the patient was granted greater independence at home or at work.

Affect was described as shallow and labile. Scholz, writing on abnormal children in 1919, characterised them as playthings of external influences, elated and expansive one hour and gloomy the next, their sympathies and antipathies replacing one another so quickly that yesterday's idol became today's enemy. Several authors remarked on a combination of superficial charm and apparent warmth with a readiness to exploit the goodwill this produced in relatives, teachers and employers. Pollitt later suggested that it was the extremity of the mood swings that had led English-language writers to adopt the term "unstable psychopath".

Learning and memory were said to be superficial. Herman Adler, describing comparable delinquent adolescents in Chicago in 1917, found that they acquired knowledge easily but neither applied nor retained it, that their memory was unreliable, and that they tended to embroider their accounts of themselves and were drawn to the theatre and to play-acting roles. Pathological lying was regarded as closely associated with the type: the Swiss psychoanalyst Arthur Kielholz treated it as a childlike game of fantasy from which the patient felt entitled to extract some real advantage, and Homburger found in his patients no felt need for truth or consistency. In Kraepelin's own scheme, as presented in Diefendorf's English adaptation, morbid lying and swindling formed a separate type, which he described as in some respects related to the unstable, with transitional forms between the two. Confronted with wrongdoing, they were said to produce contrite assurances that did not survive closer inspection, or to explain their conduct by their upbringing, by misfortune or by the influence of others.

Writers of this period attributed to the type a wide range of further characteristics, including emotional irritability, lavish spending and accumulation of debt, excessive use of alcohol, coffee, tea and medicines, early and indiscriminate sexual activity, a fondness for wandering, and an unwillingness to plan beyond the present day. Homburger wrote that the childhood and youth of these patients were extraordinarily sad, that parents and teachers rarely became concerned before school age, and that the presence of such a child could divide a family into opposing camps.

In differential diagnosis, the type was distinguished from the "asthenic" or dependent personality, with which it shared an apparent submissiveness; Tonge, writing in the British Medical Journal in 1955, considered the haltlose patient the more troublesome of the two because the compliance was not sincere. It was also set beside the hysterical (histrionic) personality, with which it was thought to share charm, suggestibility and shallowness of affect. Schneider acknowledged that even prolonged observation might not distinguish it from the early stages of schizophrenia in adolescents.

=== Theories of causation ===
Explanations offered for the condition followed the main currents of the psychiatry of the time, and none was ever tested.

Kraepelin and most of the German typologists regarded the disposition as constitutional. The internist Gustav von Bergmann argued in 1936 that it was wholly biological rather than the product of experience; the hereditarian psychiatrist Hans Luxenburger included it in his 1939 survey of the "hereditary circle" of schizophrenia; and Aschenbrenner's 1944 study of nine children born of incest reported the type among them and proposed transmission through the mother. Stumpfl's genealogical studies of offenders treated it as a heritable trait.

Psychodynamic writers sought a different root. Hans Heinze attributed the condition to an underlying sense of inferiority; Kramer suggested that the apparent carelessness masked an overwhelming fear of the consequences of one's own acts; and Kielholz interpreted the lying in terms of the competing demands of the superego and the id. Environmental accounts stressed neglect, institutional upbringing and the loss of a parent in early childhood, while acknowledging, as Lichko later did, that the type could occasionally arise in an outwardly healthy family.

Organic explanations were also advanced. Cases arising after encephalitis were reported by Raecke in 1923 and by Berlit in 1931, in line with the contemporary interest in post-encephalitic personality change; and a Danish electroencephalographic study in 1949 reported more frequent dysrhythmia in haltlose and borderline patients than in other psychopathic types.

=== Course, prognosis and management ===
The course was generally described as one of progressive social decline. Kramer traced a typical sequence from debts incurred in the pursuit of pleasure, through repeated rescue by parents, to the point at which the family could or would no longer pay; those with sufficient wit and imagination, he noted, might find other sources of income without becoming criminal. A Soviet follow-up study published in 1978 rated the prognosis among the least favourable of the psychopathies then recognised.

Treatment was regarded as nearly hopeless. Slater and Roth warned that the characteristic traits were to some extent normal in childhood and that the diagnosis should not be made in children, but concluded that in adults psychotherapy had little prospect of success, that the best that could be achieved was through social control, and that the psychiatrist's most useful function might be to protect relatives from ruining themselves in hopeless efforts at rescue. Gannushkin similarly observed that such patients readily evoked sympathy and offers of help, but that the help rarely had lasting effect. Against this, Gannushkin, Curran and Guttmann, and later Lichko, all expressed the hope that a strong-willed spouse or relative willing to exercise permanent guardianship could produce a tolerable outcome.

The one setting in which the patients were reported to do well was the closed institution. Villinger noted in 1937 that they could become "model inmates" within hours of admission, only to relapse as soon as they were released; Gannushkin made the same observation of military service; and Schneider regarded attempts at education as futile. Homburger argued for removing such children from their families as soon as the diagnosis was confirmed, to be brought up in rural educational colonies. These recommendations are the clinical background to the welfare and detention practices described below.

=== Soviet and Russian psychiatry ===
In Russian psychiatry the "unstable" type was described by Pyotr Gannushkin in his 1933 textbook on psychopathies. Gannushkin emphasised the patients' dependence on their immediate environment: he held that they functioned adequately under strict supervision, such as in military service, but deteriorated when left unsupervised, and he recommended continuous guardianship by a strong-willed relative or spouse.

Andrey Lichko retained the type in his 1977 work on psychopathies and "character accentuations" in adolescents, preferring the milder term "accentuation" for less severe cases. Lichko's description is the fullest in the later literature. He characterised unstable adolescents as suggestible, pleasure-seeking and averse to any sustained effort, drawn into delinquent peer groups, and inclined to run away from home, to begin drinking early and to treat sexual relationships as entertainment rather than attachment; he noted an attraction to fast and dangerous driving, including the theft of cars for joyriding, and childhood histories that sometimes included enuresis and stuttering. He regarded the type as rare in children from stable families, observed that these adolescents were difficult to distinguish from the hysteroid type, and held that they could live tolerably well only under the permanent guardianship of a strong-willed person. The category remained in use in Russian adolescent psychiatry into the twenty-first century. A multidisciplinary study of 90 delinquent girls aged 14 to 17 in two specialised institutions, published in German in 2010 by a group led by Elena Dozortseva, reported that among the personality deviations identified the "will-less", "haltlose", histrionic and sensitive forms were the most frequent, and characterised the more severely affected group as showing mainly the features of a personality disorder of the impulsive, haltlose or histrionic type.

=== Other countries ===
The one sustained English-language treatment appears in the Clinical Psychiatry textbook of Eliot Slater and Martin Roth, which described the "unstable psychopath" in terms closely following the German literature. The concept otherwise made little impression in Britain or the United States, where personality typologies developed along different lines. In Italy the equivalent category, gli instabili del carattere, appeared in juvenile criminology by the 1930s, and in Serbian and other south Slavic psychiatry the type has been discussed in reviews of the history of personality-disorder classification.

French-language psychiatry developed its own vocabulary for the same territory, from Dupré's déséquilibrés to the long French clinical tradition of instabilité, which historians trace from the early 1900s to the modern concept of ADHD. Paul Bailey, writing from a French forensic psychiatric unit in 1998, observed that the term was certainly not in widespread use in French psychiatry, and doubted whether it was much used in Germany either. Later publications nonetheless record some continued use: Langmaack in 2000 described the type as one sometimes seen in a British substance-misuse clinic, a Russian study of delinquent adolescent girls published in 2010 reported it among the most frequent personality findings, and a Portuguese case report followed in 2017. The French edition of ICD-10 nevertheless carries it untranslated, as personnalité de type « haltlose », among the inclusion terms under F60.8, so that the term is available in French hospital coding; and the Canadian government's translation bureau recorded "unstable drifter" as a term for which no standard French equivalent existed.

== Criminology and forensic psychiatry ==
From the 1920s the haltlose type became a staple of German-language criminal biology and forensic psychiatry. Birnbaum, Schneider and others held that, together with the gemütlos ("affectionless") type, it was one of the few psychopathic types predisposed to crime by constitution alone, and large proportions of recidivist offenders, vagrants and juvenile delinquents were assigned to it in prison and court surveys. Such figures depended entirely on the examiner's judgement, as no operational criteria existed, and historians of criminology have treated them as evidence of the diagnostic practices of the period rather than of the prevalence of any disorder.

The label was applied in a range of forensic contexts, including studies of hit-and-run drivers in the United States, of sexual offences against children, and of vagrancy in Switzerland. It also figured in debates about criminal responsibility under German law. Mezger, writing in 1949, ranked the Haltlosen, together with the Gemütlosen and the pathological swindlers, as the personality abnormalities of greatest significance for criminal law; he held that, special combinations of circumstances aside, nobody would dispute their criminal responsibility, that their having been led astray or "pushed" (Geschoben-sein) might sometimes count in mitigation, and that an emphatic warning through punishment could conversely be appropriate.

=== Under National Socialism ===
In Germany the diagnosis became closely bound up with hereditarian and eugenic theories of crime. Friedrich Stumpfl's genealogical studies of offenders in the 1930s treated Haltlosigkeit as a heritable trait, and the Hamburg criminal-biological research station classified female prisoners as "haltlose psychopaths" in the service of hereditary-health policy. A 1944 study of children born of incest, published in a leading German psychiatric journal, reported a high frequency of the type and attributed it to inheritance. Military psychiatrists during the Second World War used the diagnosis in assessing soldiers. Haltlosigkeit was not itself one of the conditions listed in the 1933 Law for the Prevention of Hereditarily Diseased Offspring, and the extent to which the label contributed to sterilisation decisions has not been separately studied. Historians have examined this episode as part of the broader entanglement of German psychiatry with Nazi eugenics.

== Social consequences ==
Beyond the courtroom, the haltlose label had its widest effect in the welfare systems of German-speaking Europe, where it was one of several psychiatric terms used to justify removing children from their families, placing adolescents in institutions, and detaining adults who had committed no crime.

=== Youth welfare in Germany ===
In Weimar Germany the concept of juvenile "psychopathy", of which the haltlose type was a prominent subtype, became institutionalised through a network of Psychopathenfürsorge ("psychopath welfare") advice centres, observation wards and special homes, developed in Berlin by Franz Kramer and the social worker Ruth von der Leyen and promoted nationally by the German Association for the Welfare of Juvenile Psychopaths. The concept entered the Reich Youth Welfare Act (Reichsjugendwohlfahrtsgesetz) of 1922, which made a finding of "neglect" (Verwahrlosung) the trigger for compulsory correctional education (Fürsorgeerziehung) ordered without the consent of the young person or their parents. The historian Anna Bergmann has traced how, from the 1880s onward, psychiatric degeneration theory treated Haltlosigkeit as a symptom of hereditary defect, so that attributions such as Haltlosigkeit, truancy and laziness functioned simultaneously as grounds for state intervention and as psychiatric symptoms; she argues that these labels, together with the legal concept of Verwahrlosung, helped to justify coercive institutionalisation and to sustain violent conditions in German children's homes into the 1970s. By the 1930s some psychiatrists held psychopathic children to be constitutionally ineducable, a judgement which, under pressure to reduce costs, was used to argue that welfare should be reserved for the educable. The term Verwahrlosung was formally abandoned in German child-welfare practice after 1990, in part because of the stigma and repression that had followed from it.

=== Administrative detention in Switzerland ===
In Switzerland the diagnosis was used by psychiatrists advising cantonal guardianship and poor-relief authorities, who between 1930 and 1981 could order the "administrative detention" (administrative Versorgung) of adults without a criminal conviction. The federal Independent Expert Commission on Administrative Detention, reporting in 2019, found that those detained were people who had come to official attention for "work-shyness", "dissoluteness", Haltlosigkeit, neglect and endangering public order, and that they were confined in institutions ranging from psychiatric clinics and alcohol-treatment and labour colonies to prisons. The commission's final report describes how the label operated along lines of gender and legitimacy: women born out of wedlock inherited the stigma of their mothers' supposed "sexual Haltlosigkeit", had sexual motives attributed to them by their families, and when they became victims of abuse were held partly responsible for a "dissolute lifestyle", so that it was often the girls and women who ended up in psychiatric institutions or homes while the perpetrators went unpunished. The commission concluded that the arbitrariness of the proceedings was not incidental but the system's central logic, that the practice reinforced existing stigma rather than compensating for it, and that the combination of social marginalisation and effective loss of rights constituted a form of structural violence; it also found that the harsh conditions in the institutions reflected a punitive attitude intended to make socially discredited people suffer, and that psychiatric care within them remained rudimentary. The Swiss federal government issued an official apology in April 2013 to former contract children, children placed in homes, people subjected to administrative detention and people forcibly sterilised, and subsequently funded a national research programme, "Welfare and Coercion" (NFP 76), to document these practices.

Research under that programme on the Zürich cantonal child-observation stations (1921–1974) found that most admissions came from guardianship and welfare authorities, that psychiatric reports served to legitimise placements that had often already been decided, and that the decisive factor in whether a child was placed outside the family was less the diagnosis than the perceived character of the parents, particularly the mother. Case files from the period show mothers of children under assessment described by foster parents and officials as "sexually haltlos" and "labile", language the researchers identify as part of a broader pathologising of unmarried and poor women.

== Classification ==
The haltlose type has never acquired operational diagnostic criteria. In ICD-10 it is named, without description, as an inclusion term under F60.8 "Other specific personality disorders", alongside eccentric, narcissistic, passive-aggressive, psychoneurotic and immature personality disorder; a clinician coding F60.8 is therefore not required to specify which of these is meant. National adoption of ICD-11, which came into effect in January 2022, is at the discretion of each WHO member state and carries no deadline. In Germany the German Modification of ICD-10 (ICD-10-GM), published by the Federal Institute for Drugs and Medical Devices on behalf of the Federal Ministry of Health, remains the mandatory classification for inpatient and outpatient diagnosis coding under the Social Code, with the 2026 version in force; ICD-11 is available only as a test version pending an official changeover. The term "haltlos" is retained as an F60.8 inclusion term in ICD-10-GM, and in the adaptation of ICD-10 approved for use in the Russian Federation in 1997. In the United States, where the clinical modification ICD-10-CM has been the mandatory morbidity classification since October 2015, "'Haltlose' type personality disorder" is one of the inclusion terms under code F60.89 "Other specific personality disorders", and "haltlose type" appears in the alphabetic index; the term is thus formally codable in American practice even though it is virtually unknown to American clinicians. It was not included in DSM-III, DSM-IV or DSM-5, and it was not carried into ICD-11, which replaced the typology of specific personality disorders with a dimensional model of severity and trait domains. The decline of the construct in Western European and English-language psychiatry has also been linked to a broader shift in psychiatry away from "volition" as an explanatory concept in favour of motivation, arousal and drive.

== Relation to modern diagnoses ==
Because the type was defined by a cluster of behaviours rather than by any theory of cause, its features have been reinterpreted in several ways as the diagnosis has receded from most Western practice.

=== Attention deficit hyperactivity disorder ===
Historians of psychiatry have identified the haltlose type as one of the two places in Kraepelin's system where adults who would today meet criteria for ADHD were classified. Holger Steinberg and Maria Strauß, analysing the eighth edition of Kraepelin's textbook, concluded that he placed milder cases with prominent mood swings under "manic disposition" or "constitutional excitement", and more severe cases, which usually presented alongside personality disorder and addiction, among the Haltlosen. They suggest that Kraepelin either saw no need to separate these patients into a category of their own or was prevented from recognising the common syndrome by the comorbidities that typically accompany it. A follow-up study of contemporaries whom Kraepelin cited, Gustav Specht and Paul Nitsche, reached similar conclusions and framed the findings as evidence that adult ADHD is not a recent construct. Paul Foley's survey of the "prehistory" of ADHD likewise treats the German descriptions of unstable and haltlos children as part of that lineage.

=== Personality disorders and addiction ===
Contributors to the Psychiatric Bulletin exchange of 1998–2000 located the type at the intersection of several ICD-10 categories: the failure to learn from experience and lack of sincere remorse of sociopathic personalities; the superficial charm, suggestibility and shallow affect of histrionic personality disorder; and the inattention and lack of persistence seen in frontal lobe syndromes. Claus Langmaack, writing from an addiction service, noted that people with chronic alcohol dependence had "not uncommonly" been said to have the disorder, and described the type as a "lovable rogue" sometimes seen in his substance-misuse clinic. The term remains available for coding wherever ICD-10 or its national modifications are in use, but published instances of the diagnosis being made since 2000 are few. A case report from a Lisbon psychiatric hospital, first published in 2017, described a homeless patient with schizoaffective disorder in whom haltlose personality disorder was recorded as a comorbid diagnosis, using Langmaack's description as the diagnostic reference. The report has since been cited in the literature on mental illness among homeless people. In the Russian-language literature, the relationship between the ICD-10 category of emotionally unstable personality disorder (F60.3) and the "excitable" and "unstable" psychopath types of the earlier typologies has been debated, with some authors arguing that the older distinctions were discarded too readily.

None of these mappings has been tested empirically, and the historical claims made about the type—its heritability, its association with particular sexual behaviours, and its supposed prevalence among offenders—were never examined by modern methods. Commentators in the English-language literature therefore treat the term largely as a historical construct rather than as a diagnosis with a single modern equivalent.

== Criticism ==
Criticism of the diagnosis dates almost to its inception. Within the German typological tradition, Stumpfl warned against diagnosing Haltlosigkeit without examining comorbid conditions that might be more significant, and Kurt Schneider himself acknowledged the difficulty of distinguishing it from early schizophrenia in adolescents even after prolonged observation. In 1976 the forensic psychiatrist Joachim-Ernst Meyer used the type to illustrate the instability of personality-disorder categories generally, arguing that the same behaviour could be construed as a neurosis or as a psychopathy depending on whether one attended to its origins or its symptoms.

Later commentators have questioned whether the construct ever had any independent validity. Svrakic and Divac-Jovanovic described the ICD-10 residual categories of haltlose, immature and psychoneurotic personality disorder as dubious. Historians have drawn attention to the moralising language in which the type was described—terms such as "degenerate", "parasitic" and "asocial"—and to its role in legitimising coercive measures, including institutionalisation and administrative detention, against people who were poor, itinerant or sexually nonconforming.

== In popular culture ==
The Russian psychologist Nikolai Kozlov has cited Dunno, the perpetually idle hero of Nikolay Nosov's children's books, as a textbook example of Lichko's unstable type. In Thomas Leveritt's novel The Exchange-Rate Between Love and Money (2008), the character Frito is described as having haltlose personality disorder.

== See also ==
- History of psychopathy
- Classification of personality disorders
- Emotionally unstable personality disorder
- Verdingkinder
