= Serenity Integrated Mentoring =

Serenity Integrated Mentoring (SIM) is the name for a mental health program that involves police officers attending sessions with patients and mental health workers to encourage behaviour change in individuals with mental health diagnoses who frequently interact with the police. The program is used in half of NHS trusts. A coalition of service users called "#StopSIM" has formed campaigning against the program and has support from individuals across the mental health sector with debate focusing on the ethics of police involvement in care and the lack of evidence for the effectiveness of the intervention.

The program was promoted by the Academic Health Science Networks and Paul Jennings, the leader of the Isle of Wight program left the police to set up an organisation called the High Intensity Network which promoted the program.

== Background ==
The name Serenity Integrated Mentoring was used by a program on the Isle of Wight involving Hampshire and Isle of Wight Constabulary and mental health services, where police officers attended meetings with mental health services.

Multiple policy documents recommended closer collaboration between the policy and mental health services. In 2012, a form of "Street Triage" was trialed on the Isle of Wight, where three mental health nurses and support workers attended the police control room, which was accompanied by a 25% drop in Section 136 mental health detentions by the police. It was found that 11.5% of individuals involved in section 136 incidents where involved in for 32% of incidents. These individuals were dubbed High Intensity Users by the police. A program was created that focused on holding these individuals with mental health diagnoses responsible for their actions and the consequences of their actions. The voluntary process invited police officers to some sessions with mental health care workers and four individual were enrolled. Interventions included threatening individuals with community behaviour orders if their disruptive behaviour continued. The professionals involved in the program reported that they could give service user more attention and found the presence of the police increased compliance, and attendance. It was estimated that the program saved 11,780 pounds per individual involved. Upon being rolled out this program was dubbed Serenity Integrated Mentoring.

== Criticism ==
A coalition of service users called "#StopSIM" has formed campaigning against the program and has support by individuals across the mental health sector with debate focusing on the ethics of police involvement and the lack of evidence.

Strong reservations were expressed by the Centre for Mental Health and British Association of Social Workers in 2021 and the National Clinical Director of NHS England wrote a letter to all directors of mental health trusts asking them to review their involvement considering its ethical and legal basis and the sharing of information.

In an editorial in BJPsych Bulletin, Allan House said that there should be processes to improve monitoring and responses to service changes that are accompanied by strong reactions from service users, and that the events surrounding SIM show a deficiency.
