= Histrionic personality disorder =

Personality disorder involving excessive emotionality and attention-seeking

- Dramatic behavior is a key marker of histrionic personality disorder.
- Specialty: Psychiatry, clinical psychology
- Symptoms: Persistent attention seeking, dramatic behavior, rapidly shifting and shallow emotions, sexually provocative behavior, undetailed style of speech, a tendency to consider relationships more intimate than they actually are
- Usual onset: Symptoms typically do not fully develop until late teens or early 20s
- Duration: Lifelong
- Causes: Authoritarian parenting, highly responsive noradrenergic systems, genetics, childhood trauma
- Diagnostic method: Based on symptoms
- Differential diagnosis: Other personality disorders, particularly borderline and narcissistic types; bipolar disorder; personality change due to another medical condition; symptoms stemming from substance use disorders; illness anxiety disorder; somatic symptom disorder
- Treatment: Predominantly psychotherapy

Histrionic personality disorder (HPD) is a personality disorder characterized by a pattern of excessive attention-seeking behaviors, usually beginning in adolescence or early adulthood, including inappropriate seduction and an excessive desire for approval.

People with HPD have a high desire for attention, make loud and inappropriate appearances, exaggerate their behaviors and emotions, and crave stimulation. They very often exhibit pervasive and persistent sexually provocative behavior in unsuitable situations, express strong emotions with an exaggerated manner, and can be easily influenced by others. Associated features can include egocentrism, self-indulgence, continuous longing for appreciation, and persistent manipulative behavior to achieve their own wants.

Histrionic personality disorder is also linked with hyperbolic language and hyperbolic communication.

== Signs and symptoms ==
Histrionic personality disorder is characterised by attention seeking behaviours, often driven by a lack of intrinsic self worth which can cause people with the disorder to seek out validation from others. People diagnosed with HPD may seem to behave in disproportionately dramatic ways, often struggling to see situations realistically. Patients with this disorder can have rapidly shifting emotions and a decreased ability to recognize the emotions of others. The emotions of people with this condition may appear superficial and shallow, and they may have a similarly impressionistic style of speech, often lacking in any real detail. This disorder is associated with extraversion, a lower tolerance for frustration or delayed gratification, and openness to new experiences.

Research has also shown that those with histrionic personality have a greater desire for social approval and reassurance and will constantly seek it out, making those with HPD more vulnerable to social media addictions. People with this disorder often display heightened sensitivity to criticism or disapproval. They may enjoy situations in which they can be the center of attention, and may feel uncomfortable when people are not paying attention to them. This can push them to act erratically or dramatically to get others to pay attention to them, possibly as a method of testing the stability of relationships. People with this disorder may have a high focus on their physical appearance, such as having flamboyant clothing or body modifications. They may also display manipulative traits, such as lying or exaggerating about having symptoms of illnesses to garner concern from others. Inappropriate sexual suggestiveness, exhibitionistic tendencies and flirtatiousness are also traits that people with this condition sometimes exhibit, and they are more likely to seek out casual sexual relationships. When their craving for attention is not met, it can heighten the severity of their symptoms.

Patients with HPD are usually high-functioning, both socially and professionally. They usually have good social skills, and can come off to others as charming and "larger than life", although they may have difficulty maintaining deeper relationships. As people with HPD tend to consider relationships closer than they usually are, they may be heavily impacted by the end of social or romantic relationships. Patients may also display impulsivity through frequent job changes, becoming easily bored with routine and feeling a constant need for novelty and excitement. This craving may also cause them to place themselves in risky situations. All of these factors may lead to a greater risk of developing clinical depression, anxiety, or somatic symptom disorder.

== Causes ==
Little research has been done to find evidence of what causes histrionic personality disorder. Although direct causes are inconclusive, various theories and studies suggest multiple possible causes of a neurochemical, genetic, psychoanalytic, or environmental nature. Traits such as extravagance, vanity, and seductiveness of hysteria have similar qualities to women diagnosed with HPD. HPD symptoms typically do not fully develop until late teens or early 20s, while the onset of treatment only occurs, on average, at approximately 40 years of age.

Major character traits may be inherited, while other traits may be due to a combination of genetics and environment, including childhood experiences.

=== Authoritarian parenting ===
There may be an association between having one or more parents with authoritarian or distant attitudes, and developing this disorder later in life.

Psychoanalytic theories incriminate authoritarian or distant attitudes by one (mainly the mother) or both parents, along with conditional love based on expectations the child can never fully meet. Using psychoanalysis, Freud believed that lustfulness was a projection of the patient's lack of ability to love unconditionally and develop cognitively to maturity, and that such patients were overall emotionally shallow. He believed the reason for being unable to love could have resulted from a traumatic experience, such as the death of a close relative during childhood or the divorce of one's parents, which gave the wrong impression of committed relationships. Exposure to one or multiple traumatic occurrences of a close friend or family member's leaving (via abandonment or mortality) could make the person unable to form true and affectionate attachments towards other people.

=== Neurochemical/physiological ===
Studies have shown that there is a strong correlation between the function of certain hormones, neurotransmitters, and the Cluster B personality disorders such as HPD. This seems to be especially evident with respect to the catecholamines. Individuals diagnosed with HPD have a highly responsive noradrenergic system, which is responsible for the synthesis, storage, and release of the neurotransmitter norepinephrine. High levels of norepinephrine lead to anxiety-proneness, dependency, novelty seeking, and high sociability.

=== Genetic ===
Twin studies have helped break down the nature versus nurture debate. A twin study conducted by the Department of Psychology at the University of Oslo attempted to establish a correlation between genetics and Cluster B personality disorders. With a test sample of 221 fraternal and identical twins, 92 monozygotic (identical) and 129 dizygotic (fraternal), researchers interviewed the subjects using the Structured Clinical Interview for DSM-III-R Personality Disorders (SCID-II) and concluded that there was a correlation of 0.67 that histrionic personality disorder is hereditary.

=== HPD and antisocial personality disorder ===
Another theory suggests a possible relationship between histrionic personality disorder and antisocial personality disorder. Research has found that 2/3 of patients diagnosed with histrionic personality disorder also meet criteria similar to those of antisocial personality disorder, which suggests both disorders, based on sex-type expressions, may have the same underlying cause.

Some family history studies have found that histrionic personality disorder, as well as antisocial and borderline personality disorder, tend to run in families, but it is unclear how much is due to genetic versus environmental factors. Both examples suggest that predisposition could be a factor as to why certain people are diagnosed with histrionic personality disorder; however, little is known about whether or not any biological compound influences the disorder or is genetically inheritable. Little research has been conducted to determine the biological sources, if any, of this disorder.

== Diagnosis ==
The person's appearance, behavior and history, along with a psychological evaluation, are usually sufficient to establish a diagnosis. There is no test to confirm this diagnosis. Because the criteria are subjective, some people may be wrongly diagnosed.

=== Assessment ===
In general clinical practice with assessment of personality disorders, one form of interview is the most popular: an unstructured interview. The actual preferred method is a semi-structured interview but there is reluctance to use this type of interview because they can seem impractical or superficial. The reason that a semi-structured interview is preferred over an unstructured interview is that semi-structured interviews tend to be more objective, systematic, replicable, and comprehensive. Unstructured interviews, despite their popularity, tend to have problems with unreliability and are susceptible to errors leading to false assumptions of the patient.

One of the single most successful methods for assessing personality disorders by researchers of normal personality functioning is the self-report inventory following up with a semi-structured interview. A disadvantage to the self-report inventory method is that, with histrionic personality disorder, there is a distortion in character, self-presentation, and self-image. This means that most clients cannot be assessed by simply asking them if they match the criteria for the disorder. Most projective testing depends less on the ability or willingness of the person to provide an accurate description of the self, but there is currently limited empirical evidence on projective testing to assess histrionic personality disorder.

=== Classification ===
Classification of personality disorders differs significantly between the two most prominent frameworks for classification of mental disorders, namely: the Diagnostic and Statistical Manual of Mental Disorders and the International Classification of Diseases, the most recent editions of which are the DSM-5-TR and ICD-11, respectively. While personality disorders, including HPD, are diagnosed as separate entities in the DSM-5, in the ICD-11 classification of personality disorders they are assessed in terms of severity levels, with trait and pattern specifiers serving to characterize the particular style of pathology. There is also a hybrid model, called the Alternative DSM-5 model for personality disorders (AMPD), which defines personality disorder diagnoses through combinations of pathological traits and areas of overall impairment.

In its categorical classification of personality disorders, located in section II, the DSM-5 categorizes personality disorders into three clusters. Belonging to Cluster B, HPD is characterized as a "pervasive pattern of excessive emotionality and attention seeking, beginning by early adulthood and present in a variety of contexts"; it is operationalized through eight criteria, at least five of which must be met. While not listed as its own diagnostic entity in the AMPD, what is conceptualized as histrionic personality disorder can instead be diagnosed as personality disorder – trait specified (PD-TS), which is a dimensional diagnosis that is constructed from the individual expression of personalty disorder, as manifested in both a general impairment in personality functioning (criterion A) along with at least one pathological personality trait (criterion B). It has been found that of these, the "traits most consistent with descriptions of HPD are attention seeking, separation insecurity, manipulativeness, emotional lability, intimacy avoidance (low), and restricted affectivity (low)." PD-TS may not adequately cover HPD, as the AMPD does not cover "maladaptive interpersonal warmth".

The World Health Organization's ICD-11 has replaced the categorical classification of personality disorders in the ICD-10, in which HPD was a distinct diagnostic category (F60.4), with a dimensional model containing a unified personality disorder (6D10) with severity specifiers, along with specifiers for prominent personality traits or patterns (6D11). Severity is assessed based on the pervasiveness of impairment in several areas of functioning, as well as on the level of distress and harm caused by the disorder, while trait and pattern specifiers are used for recording the manner in which the disturbance is manifested. Histrionic personality disorder has shown a mixed pattern of small to moderate associations with the trait domains Dissociality, Disinhibition, and Negative Affectivity, which aligns with this PD type essentially being characterized by self-centeredness and longing for attention (i.e., Dissociality), excitement and attention seeking (i.e., Disinhibition), and excessive and labile emotionality (i.e., Negative Affectivity). Two studies have also indicated negative associations with Detachment, which is consistent with the extreme extraversion and emotional expressivity (e.g., reversed Detachment) characterizing Histrionic PD.

=== Differential diagnosis ===
In order to find the most accurate diagnosis, a procedure of differential diagnosis is conducted. There are several other conditions to consider, as they may appear similar to HPD. Other Cluster B personality disorders share features with HPD, particularly borderline (BPD) and narcissistic (NPD) personality disorders, with some characteristic features, however, facilitating telling them apart. HPD also shares features with the mania and hypomania of bipolar disorder, such as excessive speech, grandiosity and hypersexuality, but HPD is different from these other disorders because of its chronic nature, regular sleep patterns, and it not responding well to medication.

While HPD and BPD share features such as splitting, manipulative behavior, emotional lability, impulsivity, and attention-seeking, characteristics of BPD such as feelings of emptiness and self-destructive behavior may serve to distinguish between them. In the case of NPD, the two disorders also involve a strong desire for attention; however, while people with HPD may employ vulnerability to solicit this attention, those with NPD desire admiration. A "tendency to be impulsive, superficial, excitement seeking, reckless, seductive, and manipulative" is also characteristic of antisocial personality disorder (ASPD), but they differ in that people with ASPD engage in antisocial behavior, as well as manipulation in order to "gain profit, power, or some other material gratification". People with HPD, on the other hand, are driven to manipulate by a desire for nurturance, and they "tend to be more exaggerated in their emotions". That tendency also serves to differentiate HPD from dependent personality disorder.

Other conditions to consider are substance use disorders and personality change due to another medical condition, as well as possibly illness anxiety disorder and somatic symptom disorder, as those who have these disorders "may use physical symptoms and complaints to signal distress". Furthermore, the threshold for diagnosis is that the condition must be dysfunctional, distressing, maladaptive and temporally stable; histrionic traits may otherwise not be pathological.

== Treatment ==
Treatment is often prompted by depression associated with dissolved relationships. Antidepressant medication does little to affect the personality disorder, but may be helpful with symptoms such as depression. Treatment for HPD itself predominantly involves cognitive behavioral therapy.

== Prognosis ==
Histrionic personality disorder is typically lifelong.

Those with HPD are more likely to look for multiple people for attention, which leads to marital problems due to jealousy and lack of trust from the other party. This makes them more likely to become divorced or separated once married. They also have an increased risk of suicide.

== Epidemiology ==
=== Prevalence ===
Reported prevalence rates for HPD vary by source, with studies having reported rates within a range from 0–3.2% among the general population. In clinical populations, this rises to 1–6%; furthermore, more recent studies, as of 2020, have estimated this prevalence to fall within the range of 10–15%.

=== Comorbidity ===
There is a high rate of comorbidity between HPD and other personality disorders; this applies especially to other personality disorders belonging to Cluster B – these being antisocial, borderline and narcissistic disorders – as well as dependent personality disorder. This stems from overlap in features and criteria between HPD and the aforementioned PDs, such as the attention-seeking also seen in narcissistic PD and the recklessness seen in antisocial PD. While someone may be diagnosed with all the personality disorders for which they are eligible per their respective specified criteria, the disorders may also be distinguished from each other based on the characteristics which are not shared (see § Differential diagnosis).

Other comorbid conditions include: depression, anxiety disorders, panic disorder, somatoform disorders, anorexia nervosa, substance use disorder (such as alcohol use disorder or opioid use disorder), body dysmorphia, and attachment disorders, including reactive attachment disorder.

=== Sex ratio ===
More women than men receive a diagnosis of HPD, but this may not reflect actual prevalence, with several findings indicating a similar prevalence for women and men. While the rate of diagnosis is four times higher among women, this may stem from bias, resulting in overdiagnosis among women and underdiagnosis among men. Furthermore, a higher rate among women may be related to other factors, such as a greater amount of women than men in the clinical setting, with the sex ratio not differing significantly from this ratio.

Gender roles may play a role, with a suggested reason for the sex ratio in diagnosis being "societal norms where sexual forwardness is less acceptable for women". In Marcie Kaplan's A Women's View of DSM-III, she argues that women are overdiagnosed due to HPD reflecting stereotypical femininity and expresses that even healthy women are often automatically diagnosed with HPD. It has been found that histrionic features are common among both masculine men and feminine women. Another issue frequently mentioned with regard to the sex ratio is the "less representative symptom presentation in males".

== History ==
Hysteria is a classical term that includes a wide variety of psychopathological states. Ancient Egyptians and Greeks blamed a displaced womb for many women's afflictions. Several researchers from the 18th and 19th centuries studied this theme, namely Charcot who defined hysteria as a "neurosis" with an organic basis, and Sigmund Freud who redefined "neurosis" as a re-experience of past psychological trauma. Histrionic personality disorder (HPD) made its first official appearance in the Diagnostic and Statistical Manual of Mental Disorders II (DSM-II) and, since the DSM-III, is the only disorder that kept the term derived from the old concept of hysteria.

=== Modern diagnosis ===
The first edition of the American Diagnostic and Statistical Manual (DSM-I), published in 1952, had no category for hysterical personality although, some of its features were included in the "emotionally unstable personality." The DSM-II (1968) was strongly impacted by psychoanalysis: some personality disorders had to be differentiated from other neuroses with the same name (e.g., hysterical, obsessive-compulsive, and neurasthenic personalities and neuroses). The new "hysterical personality" diagnosis was characterized by excessive emotional expression, clinginess as well as impressionistic speech.

Following the medical model created by Emil Kraepelin, in DSM-III (1980), and the subsequent DSM-III-R (1987) and DSM-IV (1994), personality disorders were described as discrete types and grouped into three clusters. Replacing the term hysterical from DSM-II, "histrionic personality disorder" was introduced into the DSM-III, with characterization focused on attention-seeking, seductive and dramatic conduct, unreasonable displays of anger, as well as suicidal gestures and attempts for the purpose of manipulation. The name change followed the proposition of Paul Chodoff who considered pejorative the description of the "hysterical female" as labile, egocentric, seductive, frigid and childish, as described in his article "The diagnoses of hysteria: An overview".

Criteria for HPD have been subject to change in editions following the DSM-III, mainly due to the argument of "unspecificity"; meanwhile, characteristics central to the disorder have remained through to the DSM-IV-TR. In order to differentiate HPD from borderline PD, criteria regarding the aforementioned suicide-related behaviors and outbursts of anger were removed from the criteria introduced into the DSM-IV. Another change was that the threshold number of criteria met was increased to five, as compared to four criteria in the DSM-III-R, leading to a decrease in diagnosis of the disorder. HPD remains as a diagnostic category in the latest (as of 2024) edition, DSM-5-TR (2022).

In accordance with the ICD-10, the criteria for HPD were similar to those in the DSM-IV, with two of the latter's criteria absent, namely: perception of relationships as closer than they actually are, and impressionistic speech lacking in detail.

The merits of compounding typological and dimensional models of personality were questioned during the preparation of DSM-5, reopening a century-old debate. Data, although sparse, actually suggest that the rate of presentation of "hysteria" in neurological practice has remained stable over time.

The authors of a study carried out with a sample of patients attending psychiatric day hospital, concluded that the prevalence of HPD was very low (0.4%) and comorbidity was high, especially with borderline, narcissistic, and dependent personality disorders. They suggested that the HPD category should be deleted from the DSM system, excepting that clinical phenomena of exhibitionism and attention-seeking, which are the dominant personality features of HPD, should be preserved in an exhibitionistic subtype of narcissism. Nevertheless, HPD remains present in DSM-5.

== See also ==
- Acting out
- Emotional lability
- Female hysteria
- Haltlose personality disorder

== Bibliography ==
- American Psychiatric Association (2013). "Histrionic Personality Disorder". Diagnostic and statistical manual of mental disorders (5th ed.). Washington, D.C.: American Psychiatric Publishing. pp. 667–669. ISBN 978-0-89042-555-8. OCLC 830807378.
- Dawood, Sindes; Wu, Leila Z.; Bliton, Chloe F.; Pincus, Aaron L. (2020), "Narcissistic and Histrionic Personality Disorders", in Lejuez, Carl W.; Gratz, Kim L. (eds.), The Cambridge Handbook of Personality Disorders, Cambridge Handbooks in Psychology, Cambridge: Cambridge University Press, pp. 277–291, doi:10.1017/9781108333931.049, ISBN 978-1-108-44009-7
- Novais, Filipa; Araújo, Andreia; Godinho, Paula (2015-09-25). "Historical roots of histrionic personality disorder". Frontiers in Psychology. 6: 1463. doi:10.3389/fpsyg.2015.01463. ISSN 1664-1078. PMC 4585318. PMID 26441812. This article incorporates text from this source, which is available under the CC BY 4.0 license.
- Simon, Jonatan; Lambrecht, Bastian; Bach, Bo (2023-04-06). "Cross-walking personality disorder types to ICD-11 trait domains: An overview of current findings". Frontiers in Psychiatry. 14 1175425. doi:10.3389/fpsyt.2023.1175425. ISSN 1664-0640. PMC 10116048. PMID 37091704. This article incorporates text from this source, which is available under the CC BY 4.0 license.
- Sperry, Len (2016). "Histrionic Personality Disorder". Handbook of diagnosis and treatment of DSM-5 personality disorders: assessment, case conceptualization, and treatment (Third ed.). New York, NY: Routledge, Taylor & Francis Group. pp. 144–162. doi:10.4324/9780203763728. ISBN 978-0-415-84191-7. LCCN 2015040215.
- Sulz, S. (2010). "Hysterie I: histrionische Persönlichkeitsstörung: Eine psychotherapeutische Herausforderung". Nervenarzt (in German). 81 (7): 879–888. doi:10.1007/s00115-010-3016-6. ISSN 0028-2804. PMID 20585747.
- Torrico, Tyler J.; French, Jennifer H.; Aslam, Sunny P.; Shrestha, Sangam (20 June 2024), "Histrionic Personality Disorder", StatPearls, Treasure Island (FL): StatPearls Publishing, PMID 31194465
