= Organic personality disorder =

Mental disorder

Organic personality disorder (OPD) or secondary personality change, is a condition described in the ICD-10 and ICD-11 respectively. It is characterized by a significant personality change featuring abnormal behavior due to an underlying traumatic brain injury or another pathophysiological medical condition affecting the brain. Abnormal behavior can include but is not limited to apathy, paranoia and disinhibition.

The DSM-5-TR, which is the latest edition of the DSM as of 2025, lists personality change due to another medical condition with the ICD-10-CM code F07.0, which corresponds to what the ICD-10 denotes as OPD.

In the ICD-10, it is described as a mental disorder and not included in the classification group of personality disorders. In the ICD-11, it is described as a syndrome.

== Signs and symptoms ==
OPD is associated with a large variety of symptoms, such as deficits in cognitive function, dysfunctional/abnormal behaviour, psychosis, neurosis, higher irritability and altered emotional expression. Those with OPD can experience emotional lability, meaning that their emotional expressions are unstable and fluctuating. In addition, patients may show a reduction in ability of perseverance with goals and disinhibition, often characterised by inappropriate sexual and antisocial behavior. Those affected can experience cognitive disturbances, suspiciousness and paranoia. Altered language processing in the brain can also occur. Furthermore, patients may show changes in their sexual preference and hyposexuality symptoms.

== Causes ==
OPD is associated with "personality change due to general medical condition". The OPD is included in a group of personality and behavioural disorders - in the ICD-10 this is "Personality and behavioural disorders due to brain disease, damage and dysfunction", and in the ICD-11 this is "Secondary Mental or Behavioural Syndromes Associated with Disorders or Diseases Classified Elsewhere". This mental health disorder can be caused by disease, brain damages or dysfunctions in specific brain areas in frontal lobe. The most common reason for this profound change in personality is the traumatic brain injury. Children whose brain areas have been injured or damaged, may present with attention deficit hyperactivity disorder (ADHD), oppositional defiant disorder or OPD.

OPD is most often caused by lesions in three brain areas of frontal lobe: traumatic brain injuries in orbitofrontal cortex, anterior cingulate cortex and dorsolateral prefrontal cortex. OPD may also be caused by lesions in other circumscribed brain areas.

Another common feature of personality of patients with OPD is their dysfunctional and maladaptive behaviour that causes serious problems in these patients, because they face problems with pursuit and achievement of their goals. Patients with OPD express a feeling of unreasonable satisfaction and euphoria. Patients can show aggressive behaviour and these dysfunctions in behaviour can have effects on interpersonal relationships. One explanation of signs of anger and aggression is due to an inability to handle their impulses, this type of aggression being called "impulsive aggression".

== Diagnosis ==
=== ICD-11 ===
In the ICD-11, the condition is called secondary personality change rather than organic personality disorder. To meet diagnosis there must be a clinically significant personality disturbance that represents a change from the individual's previous characteristic personality pattern. This personality disturbance must be explainable directly as a result from a pathophysiological health condition affecting the brain. The duration, onset, and remission of the health condition, along with responses to treatment of the underlying health condition, must be consistent with presentations of the personality disturbance.

There are seven sub-classifications of secondary personality change based on disturbances of affect, which includes "constricted", "blunted", "flat", "labile" and "inappropriate", along with other specified and unspecified categories.

=== ICD-10 ===
In the ICD-10 there were no specifically listed diagnostic criteria. It is characterized by "a significant alteration of the habitual patterns of behaviour displayed by the subject premorbidly, involving the expression of emotions, needs and impulses." Cognition, thought functions and sexuality are mentioned as potentially altered or affected. Two "organic" and three "syndrome" underlying causes are mentioned respectively: "pseudopsychopathic personality", "pseudoretarded personality", "frontal lobe damage", "limbic epilepsy personality" and post-lobotomy.

=== Differential diagnosis ===
Being an organic disorder, differential diagnosis between mental disorders and OPD is necessary. According to the ICD-11, specific considerations for differential diagnosis include delerium, dementia, personality disorders, impulse control disorder, and addictive behavior syndrome. For differential diagnosis in the ICD-10, along with personality disorders, there are two mentioned conditions in the ICD-10 under the same diagnostic category "F07" for consideration: postencephalitic parkinsonism (called "postencephalitic syndrome" in the ICD-10) and post-concussion syndrome.

Patients with OPD may present similar symptoms to Huntington's disease. The symptoms of apathy and irritability are common between these two conditions. OPD is somewhat similar to temporal lobe epilepsy, as patients who have chronic epilepsy may also express aggressive behaviours. Another similar symptom between Temporal lobe epilepsy and OPD is epileptic seizures. The symptom of epileptic seizure has influence on patients' personality that means it causes behavioural alterations. Temporal lobe epilepsy is associated with the hyperexcitability of the medial temporal lobe of patients.

== Treatment ==
Patients with OPD show a wide variety of sudden behavioural changes and dysfunctions. There is little information about the treatment of OPD. The pharmacological approach is the most common therapy among patients with OPD. However, the choice of drug therapy relies on the seriousness of patient's situation and what symptoms are shown. The choice and administration of specific drugs contribute to the reduction of symptoms of OPD. For this reason, it is crucial for patients' treatment to be assessed by clinical psychologists and psychiatrists before the administration of drugs.

The dysfunctions in expression of behaviour of patients with OPD and the development of symptom of irritability, which are caused by aggressive and self-injurious behaviours, can be dealt with the administration of carbamazepine. Moreover, the symptoms of this disorder can be decreased by the administration of valproic acid. Also, emotional irritability and signs of depression can be dealt with the use of nortriptyline and low-dose thioridazine. Except from the symptom of irritability, patients express aggressive behaviours.

For effective treatment of anger and aggression, carbamazepine, phenobarbital, benztropine and haloperidol may be used. In addition, the use of propranolol may decrease the frequent behaviours of rage attacks.

It is important for patients to take part in psychotherapy during drug therapy. In this way, many of the adverse effects of the medications, both physiological and behavioural, can be lessened or avoided entirely. Clinicians can provide useful and helpful support to patients during these psychotherapy sessions.

== See also ==
- Organic mental disorder
