= Personality disorder =

Maladaptive patterns of behavior, cognition, and inner experience

- Specialty: Psychiatry, clinical psychology
- Symptoms: Persistent patterns of thinking, feeling, and behaving that cause significant distress or impairment, often including difficulties with self-identity, interpersonal relationships, emotional regulation, and enduring maladaptive personality traits.
- Usual onset: Adolescence or early adulthood
- Duration: Long term
- Types: See § Classification
- Causes: Genetic, neurobiologic and psychosocial theories proposed
- Differential diagnosis: Personality difficulty, conduct-dissocial disorder, secondary personality change, autism spectrum disorder, complex post-traumatic stress disorder, cyclothymic disorder, dissociative identity disorder, dysthymic disorder, obsessive–compulsive personality disorder, schizotypal disorder, separation anxiety disorder, disorders due to substance use
- Treatment: Psychotherapy

A personality disorder (PD) is a mental disorder characterized typically by an enduring and pervasive maladaptive pattern of behavior, emotions, cognition, and inner experience, deviating from social norms. As a common feature, this manifests in significant impairment in interpersonal relationships and various aspects of functioning of the self, such as self-concept, in conjunction with pathological personality traits. These patterns develop early, are inflexible, and are associated with significant distress or disability.

There are both dimensional and categorical approaches to the classification of personality disorders, with the former being implemented in the International Classification of Diseases (ICD), whereas the main model in the Diagnostic and Statistical Manual of Mental Disorders (DSM) is categorical; moreover, the Alternative DSM-5 model for personality disorders (AMPD) combines the two into a hybrid model. In accordance with the categorical approach, personality disorders are viewed as distinct types, such as avoidant or narcissistic; on the other hand, the dimensional systems employed in the ICD-11 and AMPD rate severity and pathological traits.

For psychiatric patients, the prevalence of personality disorders is estimated between 40 and 60%. The behavior patterns of personality disorders are typically recognized by adolescence, the beginning of adulthood, or sometimes even childhood and often have a pervasive negative impact on the quality of life.

Treatment for personality disorders is primarily psychotherapeutic. Evidence-based psychotherapies for personality disorders include cognitive behavioral therapy and dialectical behavior therapy, especially for borderline personality disorder. A variety of psychoanalytic approaches are also used. Personality disorders are associated with considerable stigma in popular and clinical discourse alike. Despite various methodological schemas designed to categorize personality disorders, many issues occur with classifying a personality disorder because the theory and diagnosis of such disorders occur within prevailing cultural expectations; thus, their validity is contested by some experts on the basis of inevitable subjectivity. They argue that the theory and diagnosis of personality disorders are based strictly on social, or even sociopolitical and economic considerations. The definitions vary by source and remain a matter of controversy.

== Classification ==
There are two main approaches – the dimensional and the categorical – to the classification of personality disorders, which occurs mainly in accordance with the International Classification of Diseases (11th revision, ICD-11) and the Diagnostic and Statistical Manual of Mental Disorders (Fifth Edition, Text Revision; DSM-5-TR). The categorical approach views personality disorders as discrete entities that are distinct from each other as well as from normal personality. In contrast, the dimensional approach to personality disorders suggests that personality disorders exist on a continuum, with traits varying in degree rather than kind. The DSM-5-TR standard model is an example of the former, while the ICD-11 implements the latter.

There has been a sustained movement toward replacing categorical models of personality disorder classification with dimensional approaches. The categorical model has been criticized for not being sufficiently evidence-based; for issues such as undue prevalence of comorbidity, with the majority of people with a PD being eligible for another PD diagnosis; as well as for heterogeneity within categories, and stigmatization. In response, dimensional models have been developed that assess personality disorders in terms of severity of impairment and maladaptive personality traits. Emerging research indicates that dimensional models may have the benefit of facilitating the personalization of psychotherapy by aligning treatment strategies with underlying trait dimensions rather than diagnostic categories. The shift towards a dimensional approach is reflected in the inclusion of the AMPD in Section III of the DSM-5 and in the ICD-11's adoption of a dimensional system.

=== DSM-5 ===
In the fifth edition of the Diagnostic and Statistical Manual of Mental Disorders, a categorical classification was retained for personality disorders. Located in Section II (Diagnostic Criteria and Codes), personality disorders are thus listed in the same way as other mental disorders, rather than on a separate "axis," as previously. Its ten specific personality disorders are grouped into three clusters, namely: cluster A (paranoid, schizoid, and schizotypal PD), cluster B (antisocial, borderline, histrionic, and narcissistic PD), and cluster C (avoidant, dependent, obsessive–compulsive PD). It also contains three diagnoses for other personality disorders (other specified, unspecified, and personality change due to another medical condition). The clusters are based on descriptive similarity between the disorders they encompass, and it is not proven that they possess clinical utility.

=== AMPD ===
Introduced in section III of the DSM-5, the Alternative DSM-5 Model for Personality Disorders (AMPD) is a dimensional–categorical hybrid, yielding diagnoses based on combinations of impairment in personality functioning (criterion A), rated across identity, self-direction, empathy and intimacy; and pathological personality traits (criterion B) from the following trait domains: Negative Affectivity, Detachment, Antagonism, Disinhibition, and Psychoticism. The AMPD includes six specific personality disorders, which are defined by specific combinations of criteria A and B; these are: antisocial, avoidant, borderline, narcissistic, obsessive-compulsive, and schizotypal. There is also a diagnosis of personality disorder–trait specified available for cases not matching the aforementioned categories. Created with the aim of ameliorating issues such as arbitrary thresholds and excessive comorbidity, the AMPD was intended to replace the categorical model in the DSM-5; however, upon its rejection, it was instead placed in Section III (Emerging Measures and Models).

=== ICD-11 ===
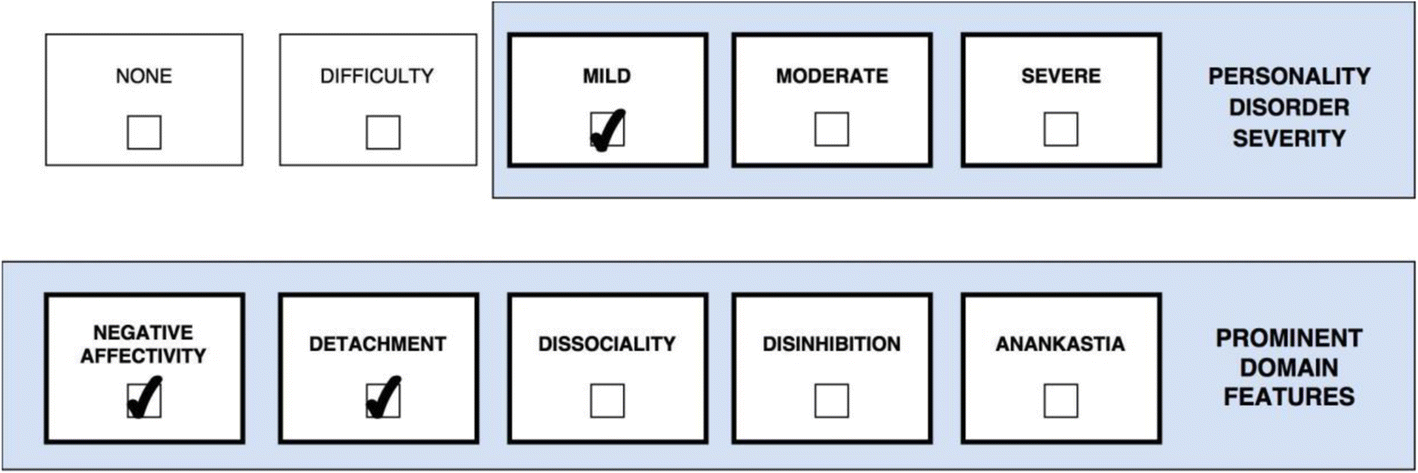
Example of personality disorder classification in the ICD-11

The ICD-11 classification of personality disorders is an implementation of a dimensional model, classifying a unified personality disorder as mild, moderate, severe, or severity unspecified; this being determined by the level of distress experienced and degree of impairment in day-to-day activities as a result of difficulties in aspects of self-functioning (e.g., identity, self-worth and agency) and interpersonal relationships (e.g., desire and ability for close relationships and ability to handle conflicts), as well as behavioral, cognitive, and emotional dysfunctions. There is also an additional category called personality difficulty, which can be used to describe personality traits that are problematic but do not meet the diagnostic criteria for a PD. A personality disorder or difficulty can be specified by one or more of the following prominent personality traits or patterns: Negative affectivity, Detachment, Dissociality, Disinhibition, and Anankastia. In addition to the traits, a Borderline pattern – similar in nature to borderline personality disorder – may be specified. In contrast to the DSM-5, the ICD-11 classifies schizotypal disorder among primary psychotic disorders rather than as a personality disorder.

=== Other and historical classifications ===
Other types of personality disorder have been included in previous versions of the diagnostic manuals but have not been retained in subsequent editions. Examples include sadistic, self-defeating (masochistic), passive–aggressive, haltlose, and immature personality disorders. As some presentations do not align with predefined categories, there are categories available for other and unspecified personality disorders in both the DSM-5-TR and preceding editions; this was also the case in the ICD-10 classification of personality disorders. Such diagnoses could be applied to the types of personality disorders that were not included as distinct categories, such as the aforementioned ones. Psychologist Theodore Millon, a researcher on personality disorders, as well as other researchers, consider some relegated diagnoses to be equally valid disorders. Millon has also proposed other personality disorders or subtypes, including mixtures of aspects of different categories of the officially accepted diagnoses.

== Signs and symptoms ==
The central features of personality disturbance in ICD-11, as in DSM-5, are disturbances in aspects of both self and interpersonal functioning. These two main features manifest in maladaptive patterns of cognition, emotional experience and expression and behaviour which must be evident across a range of personal and social situations. For a diagnosis, these disturbances must be enduring; i.e., present for a minimum of two years.

=== Functioning of the self ===
Self-dysfunction may manifest as persistent difficulties in maintaining a stable sense of identity, a pervasive sense of impoverished or highly overvalued self-worth, inaccuracies in self-perception, or challenges in self-direction and decision-making.

=== Interpersonal difficulties ===
Persistent difficulties in making and sustaining close relationships or in the ability to understand other people's perspectives are typical manifestations of the interpersonal dysfunction. The person may feel hostility toward others (antagonism). Managing conflict in relationships may also present significant challenges. They may also develop a lack of trust and lack of emotions towards others.

== Causes ==
Personality disorders are complex conditions influenced by a combination of genetic, environmental, and experiential factors. These disorders emerge from the interaction of multiple determinants, making the precise causes difficult to identify. Environmental factors play a significant role in the development of personality disorders. These include prenatal conditions, childhood trauma, abuse, neglect, and other adverse childhood experiences. Possible genetic and neurobiological causes have also been identified.

The causality can be categorized as follows: necessary causes, which are factors that must precede another event for it to occur but are not sufficient by themselves to cause the disorder; sufficient causes, which are capable of causing pathology on their own without requiring the presence of other factors to result in the development of a disorder; and contributory causes, which increase the likelihood of developing a disorder but are neither necessary nor sufficient on their own. Socioeconomic factors, childhood trauma, or other adverse life events may contribute to the emergence of a personality disorder but are not definitive causes.

The problem of genetic confounding is explained by psychologist Svenn Torgersen in a 2009 review:

If parents treat their children badly, and the children develop personality disorders, it does not necessarily mean that the treatment of the children is the cause of the development. An alternative explanation may be that the parents themselves have some personality disorder traits, partly due to genes. These genetically influenced traits correlate with poor parenting, explaining the genetic influence on parenting. The children inherit the genes and subsequently develop personality disorders. The personality disorders might thus have developed in any case, independent of the childhood conditions.

Twin studies allow scientists to assess the influence of genes and environment, in particular, how much of the variation in a trait is attributed to the "shared environment" (influences shared by twins, such as parents and upbringing) or the "unshared environment" (measurement error, noise, differing illnesses between twins, randomness in brain growth, and social or non-social experiences that only one twin experienced).

=== Childhood and parenting ===
Early childhood experiences, especially those involving primary caregivers, play a significant role in shaping personality traits. Psychoanalytic theories suggest that childhood trauma and early relationships are critical to personality development. However, there is ongoing debate about which specific childhood experiences are most influential.

==== Abuse and neglect ====
Child abuse and neglect consistently show up as risk factors for the development of personality disorders in adulthood. A study looked at retrospective reports of abuse of participants that had demonstrated psychopathology throughout their life and were later found to have past experience with abuse. In a study of 793 mothers and children, researchers asked mothers if they had screamed at their children and told them that they did not love them or threatened to send them away. Children who had experienced such verbal abuse were three times as likely as other children (who did not experience such verbal abuse) to have borderline, narcissistic, obsessive–compulsive, or paranoid personality disorders in adulthood. The sexually abused group demonstrated the most consistently elevated patterns of psychopathology. Officially verified physical abuse showed an extremely strong correlation with the development of antisocial and impulsive behavior. On the other hand, cases of abuse of the neglectful type that created childhood pathology were found to be subject to partial remission in adulthood.

==== Parenting and attachment ====
Evidence shows personality disorders may begin with parental personality issues. These cause the child to have their own difficulties in adulthood, such as difficulties reaching higher education, obtaining jobs, and securing dependable relationships. By either genetic or modeling mechanisms, children can pick up these traits. Additionally, poor parenting appears to have symptom-elevating effects on personality disorders. More specifically, lack of maternal bonding has also been correlated with personality disorders. In a study comparing 100 healthy individuals to 100 borderline personality disorder patients, analysis showed that BPD patients were significantly more likely not to have been breastfed as a baby (42.4% in BPD vs. 9.2% in healthy controls). These researchers suggested "Breastfeeding may act as an early indicator of the mother-infant relationship that seems to be relevant for bonding and attachment later in life." Additionally, findings suggest personality disorders show a negative correlation with two attachment variables: maternal availability and dependability. When left unfostered, other attachment and interpersonal problems occur later in life, ultimately leading to the development of personality disorders.

Repeated negative or dysfunctional patterns of parent-child interactions can reinforce the development of maladaptive personality traits. For instance, inconsistent or punitive parenting may contribute to the development of anxious or avoidant behaviors in children, which could later manifest as personality disorders.

=== Genetic ===
Currently, genetic research for the understanding of the development of personality disorders is severely lacking. However, there are a few possible risk factors currently in discovery. Researchers are currently looking into genetic mechanisms for traits such as aggression, fear and anxiety, which are associated with diagnosed individuals. More research is being conducted into disorder specific mechanisms.

Cluster A personality disorders have a higher probability of occurring among individuals whose first-degree relatives have either schizophrenia or a Cluster A PD.

=== Socioeconomic status ===
Socioeconomic status has also been looked at as a potential cause for personality disorders. There is a strong association with low parental/neighborhood socioeconomic status and personality disorder symptoms. In a 2015 publication from Bonn, Germany, which compared parental socioeconomic status and a child's personality, it was seen that children who were from higher socioeconomic backgrounds were more altruistic, less risk seeking, and had overall higher IQs. These traits correlate with a low risk of developing personality disorders later on in life. In a study looking at female children who were detained for disciplinary actions found that psychological problems were most negatively associated with socioeconomic problems. Furthermore, social disorganization was found to be positively correlated with personality disorder symptoms.

=== Neurobiological ===
Research shows that several brain regions are altered in personality disorders, particularly the hippocampus, which is up to 18% smaller, and a smaller amygdala, malfunctions in the striatum-nucleus accumbens and the cingulum neural pathways connecting them and taking care of the feedback loops on what to do with all the incoming information from the multiple senses; so what comes out is anti-social – not according to what is the social norm, socially acceptable and appropriate.

== Mechanism ==
=== Openness to experience ===
At least three aspects of openness to experience are relevant to understanding personality disorders: cognitive distortions, lack of insight (the ability to recognize one's own mental illness), and impulsivity. Problems related to high openness that can cause problems with social or professional functioning are excessive fantasising, peculiar thinking, diffuse identity, unstable goals and non-conformity with the demands of society.

High openness is characteristic of schizotypal personality disorder (odd and fragmented thinking), narcissistic personality disorder (excessive self-valuation), and paranoid personality disorder (sensitivity to external hostility). Lack of insight (shows low openness) is characteristic of all personality disorders and could help explain the persistence of maladaptive behavioral patterns.

The problems associated with low openness are difficulties adapting to change, low tolerance for different worldviews or lifestyles, emotional flattening, alexithymia and a narrow range of interests. Rigidity is the most obvious aspect of (low) openness among personality disorders and demonstrates the lack of knowledge of one's emotional experiences. It is most characteristic of obsessive–compulsive personality disorder; the opposite of it is known as impulsivity and is characteristic of schizotypal and borderline personality disorders.

== Diagnosis ==
Establishing a formal diagnosis of a PD is an issue for specialist psychiatry. The patient history must cover the life perspective to understand the current clinical landscape in context and against a background of the individual's unique developmental history. General and permanent problems in work, studies, and relationships are often primary and obvious observations. Difficulties in interpersonal relations are often visible already at the first patient encounter. Those difficulties justify a step-by-step deepening of the formal diagnostic work while initiating treatment efforts. Enhanced personal knowledge will also provide a more nuanced image of the patient's problems as well as adaptive resources. Accounts of the current problem and the patient's current life situation are a starting point when collecting data on the clinical history of the patient. Special attention is supposed to be given to the risks of suicide and violence. The clinical history is recommended to be expanded in a piecemeal manner on appropriate occasions.

=== Differential diagnosis ===
It is common for people with a personality disorder to have several comorbid mental disorders, including but not limited to other personality disorders, often leading to a more adverse outcome. Because of this characteristic, it is not uncommon that a person who fulfils criteria for a diagnosis of PD will seek health care for another mental disorder, which might be misleading during the diagnostic process. In some cases, there are rapid-onset depressive or anxiety states that motivate the care episode during which the coexisting problems related to a comorbid PD are apparent. Moreover, comorbidity of a more enduring character (e.g., ADHD) can obscure the clinical symptoms of, for example, borderline PD. Conversely, a severe and prolonged eating disorder may dominate over an underlying personality pathology.

When the symptomatic picture of PD is complex and partially overlapping between different diagnoses, it is seldom possible to distinguish between different underlying pathologies. The differential diagnostic procedure will therefore be more about evaluating the relative influence of the various demonstrable expressed symptoms on the severity of functioning. To optimize diagnostic accuracy self-assessment tools, semi-structured interviews and personality inventories can be used. The SCID-II is such an interview support for personality diagnosis according to the DSM-IV and DSM-5.

=== In children and adolescents ===
Diagnosing personality disorders in children is approached with caution. During childhood and adolescence, personality traits are still forming as well as ongoing cognitive and emotional development. Additionally, diagnosing a child with a personality disorder is followed with a big stigma that can be difficult for a child to face. Rather than focusing on formal diagnoses, clinicians and researchers often emphasize identifying early signs of maladaptive behavior patterns that may become more stable over time. Early stages and preliminary forms of personality disorders need a multi-dimensional and early treatment approach. Personality development disorder is considered to be a childhood risk factor or early stage of a later personality disorder in adulthood.

In addition, in Robert F. Krueger's review of their research indicates that some children and adolescents do experience clinically significant syndromes that resemble adult personality disorders and that these syndromes have meaningful correlates and are consequential. Much of this research has been framed by the adult personality disorder constructs from Axis II of the Diagnostic and Statistical Manual. Hence, they are less likely to encounter the first risk they described at the outset of their review: clinicians and researchers are not simply avoiding use of the PD construct in youth. However, they may encounter the second risk they described: under-appreciation of the developmental context in which these syndromes occur. That is, although PD constructs show continuity over time, they are probabilistic predictors; not all youths who exhibit PD symptomatology become adult PD cases.

== Management ==
The management of personality disorders involves a combination of psychotherapeutic, behavioral, and occasionally pharmacological interventions aimed at reducing symptoms, improving interpersonal functioning, and enhancing quality of life. Given the heterogeneous nature of personality disorders, treatment approaches are often tailored to the individual's specific diagnosis, severity, and co-occurring conditions.

There are different specific theories or schools of therapy within many of these treatment modalities. They may, for example, emphasize psychodynamic techniques or cognitive or behavioral techniques. In clinical practice, many therapists use an 'eclectic' approach, taking elements of different schools as and when they seem to fit an individual client. There is also often a focus on common themes that seem to be beneficial regardless of techniques, including attributes of the therapist (e.g. trustworthiness, competence, caring), processes afforded to the client (e.g. ability to express and confide difficulties and emotions), and the match between the two (e.g. aiming for mutual respect, trust and boundaries).

Treatment guidelines focused on managing ASPD and BPD emphasize treating comorbid diagnoses. There is a limited amount of evidence in regards to the treatment of AvPD, DPD, HPD, NPD, OCPD, PPD, SzPD, and StPD. The management of personality disorders such as the aforementioned includes medication and therapy.

Response of patients with personality disorders to biological and psychosocial treatments
Cluster	Evidence for brain dysfunction	Response to biological treatments	Response to psychosocial treatments
A	Evidence for relationship of schizotypal personality to schizophrenia; otherwise none known.	Schizotypal patients may improve on antipsychotic medication; otherwise not indicated.	Poor in schizoid and paranoid personalities. Variable in schizotypal personality.
B	Evidence suggestive for antisocial and borderline personalities; otherwise none known.	Antidepressants, antipsychotics, or mood stabilizers may help for borderline personality; otherwise not indicated.	Poor in antisocial personality. Variable in borderline, narcissistic, and histrionic personalities.
C	None known.	No direct response. Medications may help with comorbid anxiety and depression.	Most common treatment for these disorders. Response variable.

=== Psychotherapy ===
Individual psychotherapy has been a mainstay of treatment. There are long-term and short-term (brief) forms. Within individual therapy, various theories and schools of therapy are used. The American Psychiatric Association and Cochrane both found that psychotherapy was effective in treating BPD.

Because fundamental problems of PDs are related to interpersonal relations, a structured and stable relationship between the patient and the clinician (a 'therapeutic alliance') is necessary for, and the strongest predictor of, successful outcome of any treatment attempt. The most difficult challenge for the clinician is to achieve this goal. The strength of this alliance is crucial not only to obtain anamnestic information about the true history of the problems encountered but also to motivate and maintain adherence to treatment. The single factor that most affects the quality of this alliance is the pre-existing quality of the patient's relationships, rather than the type of PD.

Proposed non-pharmacological treatments include behavioural therapy, cognitive therapy, brief psychodynamic treatments, schema therapy, graded exposure, social skills training, psychodynamic psychotherapy, and supportive–expressive psychotherapy for AvPD; clarification-oriented psychotherapy and cognitive therapy for DPD; lifestyle modifications, medication, and psychotherapy such as CBT or group therapy for HPD; socialization groups and psychodynamic psychotherapy for SzPD; and social skills training for STPD; and psychodynamic therapy, cognitive therapy, and radically open dialectical behaviour therapy for OCPD.

==== Cognitive behavioral therapy ====
Cognitive behavioral therapy (CBT) is a form of psychotherapy that aims to reduce symptoms of various mental health conditions, primarily depression, PTSD, and anxiety disorders.

Cognitive behavioral therapy focuses on challenging and changing cognitive distortions (thoughts, beliefs, and attitudes) and their associated behaviors in order to improve emotional regulation and help the individual develop coping strategies to address problems. CBT is widely applied across personality disorders, focusing on managing negative thought patterns and maladaptive behaviors. It is evidence-based and commonly used for avoidant, obsessive-compulsive, and dependent personality disorders. It has also been proposed for paranoid PD.

==== Dialectical behavior therapy ====
Dialectical behavior therapy (DBT) is an evidence-based psychotherapy that began with efforts to treat personality disorders and interpersonal conflicts. Evidence suggests that DBT can be useful in treating mood disorders and suicidal ideation as well as for changing behavioral patterns such as self-harm and substance use. DBT evolved into a process in which the therapist and client work with acceptance and change-oriented strategies and ultimately balance and synthesize them—comparable to the philosophical dialectical process of thesis and antithesis, followed by synthesis. The NICE review for BPD recommended DBT in the treatment of BPD symptoms.

==== Other psychotherapies ====
Psychodynamic therapy aims to uncover unconscious conflicts and explore the influence of early experiences on current behavior, particularly helpful for disorders with deep-rooted interpersonal and identity issues. Mentalization-Based Therapy (MBT), initially developed for borderline personality disorder, helps individuals understand their own and others' mental states, and has shown promise for treating antisocial traits, especially in individuals with moderate psychopathy. Furthermore, Transference Focused Psychotherapy and Good Psychiatric Management have been shown to be effective in some clinical trials in the treatment of BPD, while Evolutionary Systems Therapy in a clinical trial for STPD.

=== Psychosocial ===
There are many different forms (modalities) of treatment used for personality disorders:

- Family therapy, including couples therapy.
- Group therapy for personality dysfunction is probably the second most used. For ASPD, NICE guidelines recommend group therapy focused on cognitive and behavioural techniques to manage symptoms.
- Psychological-education may be used as an addition.
- Self-help groups may provide resources for personality disorders.
- Milieu therapy, a kind of group-based residential approach, has a history of use in treating personality disorders, including therapeutic communities.
- The practice of mindfulness that includes developing the ability to be nonjudgmentally aware of unpleasant emotions appears to be a promising clinical tool for managing different types of personality disorders.

==== Behavioral management in childhood ====
Early interventions focused on parenting strategies can reduce the risk of maladaptive personality development: Punitive methods often result in anxiety, social withdrawal, or aggression. Replacing punitive discipline with supportive and structured methods fosters healthy emotional development. Contingent reward methods may promote dependency on approval. Balancing reward with encouragement of autonomy and self-worth is recommended. Inconsistent parenting contributes to confusion and anxiety. Consistency and structure in discipline help develop adaptive behavior patterns.

=== Pharmacological ===
Psychiatric medications are not a primary treatment for personality disorders, with no pharmaceuticals being registered for use in the treatment of personality disorders, and their use for this purpose lacking sufficient evidence. The underlying hypothesis when attempting psychotropic pharmaceuticals in the treatment of PDs is the assumption that the features and attributes associated with the clinical expression are linked to biochemical abnormalities and thus can be regulated by psychotropic drugs. For most specific PDs, studies on the putative benefit of pharmaceuticals are lacking, and where studies have been done, the results are at best modest.

A pharmacological approach may be used in an attempt to reduce or eliminate specific symptoms seen in other psychiatric disorders, where there is evidence that the drug in question is efficient, such as when symptoms of anxiety, depression, or impulsivity are present. Common medications include antidepressants (for mood-related symptoms), anxiolytics (used cautiously for short-term anxiety), and antipsychotics (for severe cognitive distortions or paranoid ideation). It has been suggested that future development of pharmacological treatments should focus on the treatment of traits, such as those in the AMPD and ICD-11 classification.

NICE guidelines discourage the use of medication to treat ASPD and BPD, or their symptoms and related behaviors. The Cochrane Review for ASPD found that there was no good-quality evidence for the use of medication or therapy for the treatment of ASPD. Both the American Psychiatric Association and Cochrane found that the evidence for medication being effective in treating BPD was weak. Medication has been proposed for treatment of negative symptoms similar to those in schizophrenia in the case of SzPD. Risperidone and olanzapine have been proposed for STPD.

Despite insufficient evidence for the benefit of pharmaceutical treatment, patients with PDs are frequently prescribed many drugs, often over a long time, and without information about the expected or obtained benefit or how the treatment was followed up. Such polypharmacy, particularly in combination with poor documentation, can put patients at risk of adverse drug events (side effects) and interactions. Despite the lack of evidence supporting the benefit of antipsychotics in people with personality disorders, 1 in 4 who do not have a serious mental illness are prescribed them in UK primary care. Many people receive these medications for over a year, contrary to NICE guidelines. No medication has been approved by the U.S. Food and Drug Administration for the purpose of treating personality disorders.

=== Challenges ===
The management and treatment of personality disorders can be a challenging and controversial area, for by definition the difficulties are enduring and affect multiple areas of functioning. This often involves interpersonal issues, and there can be difficulties in seeking and obtaining help from organizations in the first place, as well as with establishing and maintaining a specific therapeutic relationship. There is also substantial social stigma and discrimination related to the diagnosis.

==== Egosyntonicity ====
An individual with a personality disorder may not consider themselves to have a mental health problem or their personality to be disordered or the cause of problems. This perspective may be caused by the patient's ignorance or lack of insight into their own condition. Psychoanalytic theory has been used to explain treatment-resistant tendencies as egosyntonic (i.e., consistent with the ego integrity of the individual), which means that patients do not experience the pathology as being in conflict with their goals and self-image, and it is therefore perceived to be appropriate. In addition, this behavior can result in maladaptive coping skills and may lead to personal problems that induce extreme anxiety, distress, or depression and result in impaired psychosocial functioning.

Of those who have a personality disorder, many lack recognition of any abnormality and defend valiantly their continued occupancy of their personality role; they have been termed the Type R, or treatment-resisting, personality disorders. This is in opposition to the Type S or treatment-seeking ones, who are keen on altering their personality disorders and sometimes clamor for treatment. The classification of 68 personality disordered patients on the caseload of an assertive community team using a simple scale showed a 3 to 1 ratio between Type R and Type S personality disorders, with Cluster C personality disorders being significantly more likely to be Type S, and paranoid and schizoid (Cluster A) personality disorders significantly more likely to be Type R than others.

==== Heterogeneity ====
The term 'personality disorder' encompasses a wide, heterogeneous range of issues, each with a different level of severity or impairment; thus, personality disorders can require fundamentally different approaches and understandings. For example, while some manifestations are characterized by continual social withdrawal and the shunning of relationships, others may cause fluctuations in forwardness. The extremes are worse still: at one extreme lie self-harm and self-neglect, while at another extreme some individuals may commit violence and crime. There can be other factors, such as problematic substance use or dependency or behavioral addictions.

==== Difficulties in therapy ====
Therapists can become disheartened by lack of initial progress or by apparent progress that then leads to setbacks. Clients may be perceived as negative, rejecting, demanding, aggressive or manipulative. This has been looked at in terms of both therapist and client; in terms of social skills, coping efforts, defense mechanisms, or deliberate strategies; and in terms of moral judgments or the need to consider underlying motivations for specific behaviors or conflicts. The vulnerabilities of a client and of a therapist may become lost behind actual or apparent strength and resilience. Community mental health services may view individuals with personality disorders as too complex or difficult and may directly or indirectly exclude individuals with such diagnoses or associated behaviors.

In treatment, it is important to maintain appropriate professional personal boundaries while allowing for emotional expression and therapeutic relationships. However, there can be difficulty in acknowledgement of the differences in subjective perspectives between client and therapist. A therapist may assume that the kinds of relationships and ways of interacting that make them feel safe and comfortable have the same effect on clients. As an example of one extreme, people who may have been exposed to hostility, deceptiveness, rejection, aggression or abuse in their lives may in some cases be made confused, intimidated or suspicious by presentations of warmth, intimacy or positivity. On the other hand, reassurance, openness and clear communication are usually helpful and needed. It can take several months of sessions, and perhaps several stops and starts, to begin to develop a trusting relationship that can meaningfully address a client's issues.

== Prognosis ==
It is generally assumed that all personality disorders are linked to impaired functioning and a reduced quality of life (QoL) because that is a basic diagnostic requirement. But research shows that this may be true only for some types of personality disorder. In several studies, higher levels of disability and lower QoL were predicted by avoidant, dependent, schizoid, paranoid, schizotypal and antisocial personality disorders. This link is particularly strong for avoidant, schizotypal and borderline PD. Not being able to fit in society for borderline personality disorder leads to a high risk of suicide, but with treatment, that risk can be reduced. However, obsessive–compulsive PD was not related to a reduced QoL or increased impairment. A prospective study reported that all PD were associated with significant impairment 15 years later, except for obsessive compulsive and narcissistic personality disorder.

One study investigated some aspects of "life success" (status, wealth and successful intimate relationships). It showed somewhat poor functioning for schizotypal, antisocial, borderline, and dependent PD; schizoid PD had the lowest scores regarding these variables. Paranoid, histrionic and avoidant PD were average. Narcissistic and obsessive–compulsive PD, however, had high functioning and appeared to contribute rather positively to these aspects of life success. There is also a direct relationship between the number of diagnostic criteria and quality of life. For each additional personality disorder criterion that a person meets, there is an even reduction in quality of life. Another study indicated that negative affectivity predicts suicidal attempts. Personality disorders – especially dependent, narcissistic, and sadistic personality disorders – also facilitate various forms of counterproductive work behavior, including knowledge hiding and knowledge sabotage.

=== Occupational functioning ===
Personality disorders can impact workplace experiences in various ways, depending on the diagnosis, severity, individual, and job context. Some individuals may experience difficulties with interpersonal relationships, communication, or stress management, which can affect workplace dynamics. In addition to the direct effects of personality-related traits, indirect factors such as comorbid mental health conditions, educational challenges, or external life stressors may also influence job performance.

While challenges may exist, individuals with personality disorders can also be in high-level positions in the corporate world. In 2005 and again in 2009, psychologists Belinda Board and Katarina Fritzon at the University of Surrey, UK, interviewed and gave personality tests to high-level British executives and compared their profiles with those of criminal psychiatric patients at Broadmoor Hospital in the UK. They found that three – namely: histrionic, narcissistic and obsessive–compulsive – out of eleven personality disorders were actually more common in executives than in the disturbed criminals. According to leadership academic Manfred F.R. Kets de Vries, it seems almost inevitable that some personality disorders will be present in a senior management team.

=== Social functioning ===
Social function is affected by many other aspects of mental functioning apart from that of personality. However, whenever there is persistently impaired social functioning in conditions in which it would normally not be expected, the evidence suggests that this is more likely to be created by personality abnormality than by other clinical variables. The Personality Assessment Schedule gives social function priority in creating a hierarchy in which the personality disorder creating the greater social dysfunction is given primacy over others in a subsequent description of personality disorder.

== Epidemiology ==
=== Prevalence ===
The prevalence of personality disorder in the general community was largely unknown until surveys starting from the 1990s. In 2008 the median rate of diagnosable PD was estimated at 10.6%, based on six major studies across three nations. This rate of around one in ten, especially as associated with high use of cocaine, is described as a major public health concern requiring attention by researchers and clinicians. The prevalence of individual personality disorders ranges from about 2% to 8% for the more common varieties, such as obsessive-compulsive, schizotypal, antisocial, borderline, and histrionic, to 0.5–1% for the least common, such as narcissistic and avoidant.

A screening survey across 13 countries by the World Health Organization using DSM-IV criteria reported in 2009 a prevalence estimate of around 6% for personality disorders. The rate sometimes varied with demographic and socioeconomic factors, and functional impairment was partly explained by co-occurring mental disorders. In the US, screening data from the National Comorbidity Survey Replication between 2001 and 2003, combined with interviews of a subset of respondents, indicated a population prevalence of around 9% for personality disorders in total. Functional disability associated with the diagnoses appeared to be largely due to co-occurring mental disorders (Axis I in the DSM). This statistic has been supported by other studies in the US, with overall global prevalence statistics ranging from 9% to 11%.

A UK national epidemiological study (based on DSM-IV screening criteria), reclassified into levels of severity rather than just diagnosis, reported in 2010 that the majority of people show some personality difficulties in one way or another (short of the threshold for diagnosis), while the prevalence of the most complex and severe cases (including meeting criteria for multiple diagnoses in different clusters) was estimated at 1.3%. Even low levels of personality symptoms were associated with functional problems, but the most severely in need of services was a much smaller group. Personality disorders (especially Cluster A) are found more commonly among homeless people.

=== Comorbidity ===
Comorbidity with several disorders, both within and outside the PD spectrum is common; it is seen across the whole spectrum of PDs and other mental disorders and in general represents a broader pattern of symptoms as well as a more severe condition. This is reflected in the observation that the total number of fulfilled criteria for any PD is related to the observed dysfunction and to the reported quality of life. Comorbidity between PDs and other mental disorders contributes significantly to functional impairment while also increasing the risk of early mortality.

=== Non-PD comorbitity ===
Significant evidence suggests a small proportion of people with Cluster A personality disorders, especially schizotypal personality disorder, have the potential to develop schizophrenia and other psychotic disorders.

=== Comorbidity among categories ===
It is common for patients with a personality disorder to develop symptoms of another kind, co-occurring. Patients who meet the DSM-IV-TR diagnostic criteria for one personality disorder are likely to meet the diagnostic criteria for another.

DSM-III-R personality disorder diagnostic co-occurrence aggregated across six research sites
Type of Personality Disorder	PPD	SzPD	StPD	ASPD	BPD	HPD	NPD	AvPD	DPD	OCPD
Paranoid (PPD)	—	8	19	15	41	28	26	44	23	21
Schizoid (SzPD)	38	—	39	8	22	8	22	55	11	20
Schizotypal (StPD)	43	32	—	19	4	17	26	68	34	19
Antisocial (ASPD)	30	8	15	—	59	39	40	25	19	9
Borderline (BPD)	31	6	16	23	—	30	19	39	36	12
Histrionic (HPD)	29	2	7	17	41	—	40	21	28	13
Narcissistic (NPD)	41	12	18	25	38	60	—	32	24	21
Avoidant (AvPD)	33	15	22	11	39	16	15	—	43	16
Dependent (DPD)	26	3	16	16	48	24	14	57	—	15
Obsessive–Compulsive (OCPD)	31	10	11	4	25	21	19	37	27	—

=== Sex ratio ===
There are some sex differences in the frequency of personality disorders, which are shown in the table below. The known prevalence of some personality disorders, especially borderline PD and antisocial PD, is affected by diagnostic bias. This is due to many factors, including disproportionately high research towards borderline PD and antisocial PD, alongside social and gender stereotypes, and the relationship between diagnosis rates and prevalence rates. Since the removal of depressive PD, self-defeating PD, sadistic PD and passive-aggressive PD from the DSM-5, studies analysing their prevalence and demographics have been limited.

Sex differences in the frequency of personality disorders
Type of personality disorder	Predominant sex	Notes
Paranoid personality disorder	Inconclusive	In clinical samples men have higher rates, whereas epidemiologically there is a reported higher rate of women although due to the controversy of paranoid personality disorder the usefulness of these results is disputed
Schizoid personality disorder	Male	About 10% more common in males
Schizotypal personality disorder	Inconclusive	The DSM-5 reports it is slightly more common in males, although other results suggest a prevalence of 4.2% in women and 3.7% in men
Antisocial personality disorder	Male	About three times more common in men, with rates substantially higher in prison populations, up to almost 50% in some prison populations
Borderline personality disorder	Female	Diagnosis rates vary from about three times more common in women, to only a minor predominance of women over men. This is partially attributable to increased rates of treatment-seeking in women, although disputed
Histrionic personality disorder	Equal	Prevalence rates are equal, although diagnostic rates can favour women
Narcissistic personality disorder	Male	7.7% for men, 4.8% for women
Avoidant personality disorder	Female	2.8% in women, 1.2% in men.
Dependent personality disorder	Female	0.6% in women, 0.4% in men.
Obsessive–compulsive personality disorder	Inconclusive	The DSM-5 lists a male-to-female ratio of 2:1, however other studies have found equal rates

== History ==
=== Diagnostic and Statistical Manual history ===
Personality disorder diagnoses in each edition of the Diagnostic and Statistical Manual
DSM-I	DSM-II	DSM-III	DSM-III-R	DSM-IV(-TR)	DSM-5
Inadequate (Note: DSM-I Personality Pattern disturbance subsection.)	Inadequate	Deleted	—N/a	—N/a	—N/a
Schizoid	Schizoid	Schizoid	Schizoid	Schizoid	Schizoid
Cyclothymic	Cyclothymic	Reclassified	—N/a	—N/a	—N/a
Paranoid	Paranoid	Paranoid	Paranoid	Paranoid	Paranoid
—N/a	—N/a	Schizotypal	Schizotypal	Schizotypal	Schizotypal (Note: Also classified as a schizophrenia-spectrum disorder in addition to personality disorder.)
Emotionally unstable (Note: DSM-I Personality Trait disturbance subsection.)	Hysterical	Histrionic	Histrionic	Histrionic	Histrionic
—N/a	—N/a	Borderline	Borderline	Borderline	Borderline
Compulsive	Obsessive–compulsive	Compulsive	Obsessive–compulsive	Obsessive–compulsive	Obsessive–compulsive
Passive–aggressive, Passive–dependent subtype	Deleted	Dependent	Dependent	Dependent	Dependent
Passive–aggressive, Passive–aggressive subtype	Passive–aggressive	Passive–aggressive	Passive–aggressive	Deleted (Note: Excluded from formal diagnoses and moved to Appendix.)	—N/a
Passive–aggressive, Aggressive subtype	—N/a	—N/a	—N/a	—N/a	—N/a
—N/a	Explosive	Deleted	—N/a	—N/a	—N/a
—N/a	Asthenic	Deleted	—N/a	—N/a	—N/a
—N/a	—N/a	Avoidant	Avoidant	Avoidant	Avoidant
—N/a	—N/a	Narcissistic	Narcissistic	Narcissistic	Narcissistic
Antisocial reaction (Note: DSM-I Sociopathic personality disturbance subsection.)	Antisocial	Antisocial	Antisocial	Antisocial	Antisocial
Dyssocial reaction	—N/a	—N/a	—N/a	—N/a	—N/a
Sexual deviation	Reclassified	—N/a	—N/a	—N/a	—N/a
Addiction	Reclassified	—N/a	—N/a	—N/a	—N/a
Appendix
			Self-defeating	Passive-aggressive (Negativistic)	Personality disorder - Trait specified
			Sadistic	Depressive	

Introduced Deleted

=== Before the 20th century ===
Personality disorder is a term with a distinctly modern meaning, owing in part to its clinical usage and the institutional character of modern psychiatry. The currently accepted meaning must be understood in the context of historical changing classification systems such as DSM-IV and its predecessors. Although highly anachronistic, and ignoring radical differences in the character of subjectivity and social relations, some have suggested similarities to other concepts going back to at least the ancient Greeks. For example, the Greek philosopher Theophrastus described 29 character types that he saw as deviations from the norm, and similar views have been found in Asian, Arabic and Celtic cultures. A long-standing influence in the Western world was Galen's concept of personality types, which he linked to the four humours proposed by Hippocrates.

In ancient India, the concept of temperament was closely related to the ideas in Ayurvedic medicine, which categorized individuals according to three doshas—Vata, Pitta, and Kapha. These doshas, or bodily humors, were believed to influence not just physical health but also the mental and emotional state of a person. Imbalances in these doshas were thought to result in behavioral abnormalities, echoing the Western notion of temperament but grounded in a more holistic, mind-body connection.

Similarly, ancient Chinese philosophy emphasized the balance of the five elements (wood, fire, earth, metal, and water), with each element corresponding to certain personality traits and emotional responses. Traditional Chinese medicine linked these elements to specific organs in the body and believed that emotional imbalances could result in physical illness. The idea that a person's emotional and behavioral state could affect both their health and their social relationships is a concept that resonates with contemporary ideas about personality disorders.

In the Arabic world, thinkers like Avicenna (Ibn Sina) incorporated Galenic ideas into their medical writings, further developing the concept of temperament. Avicenna expanded on the four humors proposed by Hippocrates and Galen, suggesting that certain personality traits—such as choleric (angry), melancholic (sad), sanguine (optimistic), and phlegmatic (calm)—were reflective of imbalances in bodily fluids. These early understandings of personality types laid the groundwork for later, more refined concepts of character in Western psychiatry.

The Celtic tradition also featured an early form of personality categorization, though more aligned with social roles and behaviors within their tribes. The Celts saw human nature as a reflection of natural forces, and individuals who exhibited extreme or deviant behaviors were often seen as outside the norms of their community, potentially deserving of spiritual or ritual intervention. This is similar to how the concept of personality disorders began to be tied to moral and social deviations rather than purely medical ones.

Such views lasted into the eighteenth century, when experiments began to question the supposed biologically based humours and temperaments. Psychological concepts of character and 'self' became widespread. In the nineteenth century, personality referred to a person's conscious awareness of their behavior, a disorder of which could be linked to altered states such as dissociation. This sense of the term has been compared to the use of the term multiple personality disorder in the first versions of the DSM.

Physicians in the early nineteenth century started to diagnose forms of insanity involving disturbed emotions and behaviors but seemingly without significant intellectual impairment or delusions or hallucinations. Philippe Pinel referred to this as manie sans délire ('mania without delusions') and described a number of cases mainly involving excessive or inexplicable anger or rage. James Cowles Prichard advanced a similar concept he called moral insanity, which would be used to diagnose patients for some decades. "Moral" in this sense referred to affect (emotion or mood) rather than simply the ethical dimension, but it was arguably a significant move for psychiatric diagnostic practice to become so clearly engaged with judgments about individual's social behaviour. Prichard was influenced by his own religious, social and moral beliefs, as well as ideas in German psychiatry. These categories were much different and broader than later definitions of personality disorder, while also being developed by some into a more specific meaning of moral degeneracy akin to later ideas about 'psychopaths'. Separately, Richard von Krafft-Ebing popularized the terms sadism and masochism, as well as homosexuality, as psychiatric issues.

The German psychiatrist Koch sought to make the moral insanity concept more scientific, and in 1891 suggested the phrase psychopathic inferiority, theorized to be a congenital disorder. This referred to continual and rigid patterns of misconduct or dysfunction in the absence of apparent "mental retardation" or illness, supposedly without a moral judgment. Described as deeply rooted in his Christian faith, his work established the concept of personality disorder as used today.

=== 20th century ===
In the early 20th century, another German psychiatrist, Emil Kraepelin, included a chapter on psychopathic inferiority in his influential work on clinical psychiatry for students and physicians. He suggested six types – excitable, unstable, eccentric, liar, swindler and quarrelsome. The categories were essentially defined by the most disordered criminal offenders observed, distinguished between criminals by impulse, professional criminals, and morbid vagabonds who wandered through life. Kraepelin also described three paranoid (meaning then delusional) disorders, resembling later concepts of schizophrenia, delusional disorder and paranoid personality disorder. A diagnostic term for the latter concept would be included in the DSM from 1952, and from 1980 the DSM would also include schizoid, schizotypal; interpretations of earlier (1921) theories of Ernst Kretschmer led to a distinction between these and another type later included in the DSM, avoidant personality disorder.

In 1933 Russian psychiatrist Pyotr Borisovich Gannushkin published his book Manifestations of Psychopathies: Statics, Dynamics, Systematic Aspects, which was one of the first attempts to develop a detailed typology of psychopathies. Regarding maladaptation, ubiquity, and stability as the three main symptoms of behavioral pathology, he distinguished nine clusters of psychopaths: cycloids (including constitutionally depressive, constitutionally excitable, cyclothymics, and emotionally labile), asthenics (including psychasthenics), schizoids (including dreamers), paranoiacs (including fanatics), epileptoids, hysterical personalities (including pathological liars), unstable psychopaths, antisocial psychopaths, and constitutionally stupid. Some elements of Gannushkin's typology were later incorporated into the theory developed by a Russian adolescent psychiatrist, Andrey Yevgenyevich Lichko, who was also interested in psychopathies along with their milder forms, the so-called accentuations of character.

In 1939, psychiatrist David Henderson published a theory of 'psychopathic states' that contributed to popularly linking the term to anti-social behavior. Hervey M. Cleckley's 1941 text, The Mask of Sanity, based on his personal categorization of similarities he noted in some prisoners, marked the start of the modern clinical conception of psychopathy and its popularist usage.

Towards the mid 20th century, psychoanalytic theories were coming to the fore based on work from the turn of the century being popularized by Sigmund Freud and others. This included the concept of character disorders, which were seen as enduring problems linked not to specific symptoms but to pervasive internal conflicts or derailments of normal childhood development. These were often understood as weaknesses of character or willful deviance, and were distinguished from neurosis or psychosis. The term 'borderline' stems from a belief some individuals were functioning on the edge of those two categories, and a number of the other personality disorder categories were also heavily influenced by this approach, including dependent, obsessive–compulsive and histrionic, the latter starting off as a conversion symptom of hysteria particularly associated with women, then a hysterical personality, then renamed histrionic personality disorder in later versions of the DSM. A passive aggressive style was defined clinically by Colonel William Menninger during World War II in the context of men's reactions to military compliance, which would later be referenced as a personality disorder in the DSM. Otto Kernberg was influential with regard to the concepts of borderline and narcissistic personalities later incorporated in 1980 as disorders into the DSM.

Meanwhile, a more general personality psychology had been developing in academia and to some extent clinically. Gordon Allport published theories of personality traits from the 1920s—and Henry Murray advanced a theory called personology, which influenced a later key advocate of personality disorders, Theodore Millon. Tests were developing or being applied for personality evaluation, including projective tests such as the Rorschach test, as well as questionnaires such as the Minnesota Multiphasic Personality Inventory. Around mid-century, Hans Eysenck was analysing traits and personality types, and psychiatrist Kurt Schneider was popularising a clinical use in place of the previously more usual terms 'character', 'temperament' or 'constitution'.

American psychiatrists officially recognized concepts of enduring personality disturbances in the first Diagnostic and Statistical Manual of Mental Disorders in the 1950s, which relied heavily on psychoanalytic concepts. Somewhat more neutral language was employed in the DSM-II in 1968, though the terms and descriptions had only a slight resemblance to current definitions. The DSM-III published in 1980 made some major changes, notably putting all personality disorders onto a second separate 'axis' along with "mental retardation", intended to signify more enduring patterns, distinct from what were considered axis one mental disorders. 'Inadequate' and 'asthenic' personality disorder' categories were deleted, and others were expanded into more types, or changed from being personality disorders to regular disorders. Sociopathic personality disorder, which had been the term for psychopathy, was renamed Antisocial Personality Disorder. Most categories were given more specific 'operationalized' definitions, with standard criteria psychiatrists could agree on to conduct research and diagnose patients. In the DSM-III revision, self-defeating personality disorder and sadistic personality disorder were included as provisional diagnoses requiring further study. They were dropped in the DSM-IV, though a proposed 'depressive personality disorder' was added; in addition, the official diagnosis of passive–aggressive personality disorder was dropped, tentatively renamed 'negativistic personality disorder.'

International differences have been noted in how attitudes have developed towards the diagnosis of personality disorder. Kurt Schneider argued they were 'abnormal varieties of psychic life' and therefore not necessarily the domain of psychiatry, a view said to still have influence in Germany today. British psychiatrists have also been reluctant to address such disorders or consider them on par with other mental disorders, which has been attributed partly to resource pressures within the National Health Service, as well as to negative medical attitudes towards behaviors associated with personality disorders. In the US, the prevailing healthcare system and psychoanalytic tradition has been said to provide a rationale for private therapists to diagnose some personality disorders more broadly and provide ongoing treatment for them.

== See also ==
- Clinical psychology
- Dangerous and severe personality disorder
- Personality psychology
- Structured Clinical Interview for DSM
