= Andrey Lichko =

Russian psychiatrist (1926–1994)

Andrey Yevgenyevich Lichko
- Андрей Евгеньевич Личко
- Born: Andrey Yevgenyevich Lichko; October 8, 1926; Luga, Soviet Union
- Died: 1994
- Scientific career
- Fields: Psychiatry
- Workplaces: The Bekhterev Research Institute

Andrey Yevgenyevich Lichko (Russian: Андре́й Евге́ньевич Личко; 1926–1994) was a Russian psychiatrist, an honored science worker of the Russian Federation, Doctor of Medicine, and vice principal of Saint-Petersburg Psychoneurological Institute n.a. V.M. Bekhterev. His main directions of scientific research were diagnostics and treatment of mental disorders of adolescents.

== Contributions ==
Lichko created his own personality typology on the basis of works by Pyotr Gannushkin and Karl Leonhard. He has written several psychiatry books: "Adolescent Psychiatry", "Psychopathy and Accentuations of Character at Teenagers", "Schizophrenia in Teenagers", and "Adolescent Narcology". He is also known as the author of a book called "History as Viewed by a Psychiatrist: Ivan the Terrible, Joseph Stalin, Adolf Hitler, Nikolai Gogol, and Others". He has written at length about Haltlose personality disorder.

In the late eighties Lichko spearheaded an effort to revive the Bekhterev Review of Psychiatry and Medical Psychology. After the journal had been reestablished, he became its deputy editor.

== Accentuations of character ==
His monograph entitled "Psychopathy and Accentuations of Character of Teenagers" (1977) has become an indispensable textbook for many generations of Russian psychiatrists and psychologists. For writing this book, Andrey Lichko was awarded the Honorary Certificate n.a. V.M. Bekhterev by USSR Academy of Medical Sciences. In this monograph, Andrey Lichko has enriched the theory of psychopathy (what is known today as personality disorders) by demonstrating that along with psychopathy it is necessary to distinguish the so-called accentuations of character. Lichko's typology has parallels with those of Karl Leonhard and Pyotr Gannushkin.

Persons with accentuations of character are placed somewhere between mentally sane persons and psychopaths (those who have different personality disorders). Referring to the famous monograph by the German psychiatrist Karl Leonhard, "Accentuated Persons", Andrey Lichko emphasized that it is more correct to use the term "accentuations of character" instead of the term "accentuated personality" because personality appears to be a wider notion, which includes IQ, skills, worldview, and so on.

With his theory of accentuations of character, Andrey Lichko has contributed to the understanding of etiology of neuroses by proposing the concept of the so-called "locus of the least resistance" (locus minoris resistentiae) within the character structure.

Introducing the notion of the "locus of the least resistance" ("weak unit") within the character, as well as the description of these loci in relation to each type of accentuation of character is a most important contribution to characterology. It also appears to be an invaluable tool in practice. It is urgent to know the vulnerable areas of every person in order to avoid inappropriate steps, overwork, accidents, and complications.

This conception emerged as the result of elaboration of the idea of the "individual sensibility" to psychic traumas proposed by the eminent Russian developmental psychologist, Vladimir Nikolayevich Myasishchev. By improving and elaborating the conception of "situativity" and "individual hypersensibility" to outside influence, Andrey Lichko has developed the theory stating that each type of accentuation of character has its own different "Achilles' Heel". On the assumption of these observations, Andrey Lichko supposed that neurosis is mostly linked with the juxtaposition of a pathogenic situation and the individual peculiarities of character.

If however a psychic trauma, even hard, does not address the locus of the least resistance and does not touch this Achilles' heel, i.e. the situation does not require too much in this relation, then everything is usually limited to the adequate reaction of personality.
