= Eugen Kahn =

German psychiatrist

Eugen Kahn (born 20 May 1887 in Stuttgart, Germany – died January 1973 in Houston, Texas) was a German psychiatrist. His "habilitation" supervisors were Emil Kraepelin and Ernst Rüdin.

He argued Willenlos was a misnomer for the Haltlose, as the patients demonstrated plenty of "will" and simply lacked the ability to translate it into action. He was the first Sterling Professor of Psychiatry and Chairman of the Department of Psychiatry at Yale 1930-1946.
