= Psychiatrist (disambiguation) =

Psychiatrist may refer to:

- A psychiatrist, a physician who specializes in the clinical field of psychiatry
- The Royal College of Psychiatrists, the main professional organisation of psychiatrists in the United Kingdom and Ireland
- Psychiatrist (game), or "Psycho"; a party game

== See also ==
- The Psychiatrist (disambiguation)
