= Emotional lability =

Large, rapid changes in mood or affect

In medicine and psychology, emotional lability is a sign or symptom typified by exaggerated changes in mood or affect in quick succession. Sometimes the emotions expressed outwardly are very different from how the person feels on the inside. These strong emotions can be a disproportionate response to something that happened, but other times there might be no trigger at all. The person experiencing emotional lability usually feels like they do not have control over their emotions. For example, someone might cry uncontrollably in response to any strong emotion even if they do not feel sad or unhappy.

== Causes ==
Emotional lability is seen or reported in various conditions including borderline personality disorder, histrionic personality disorder, post-traumatic stress disorder, hypomanic or manic episodes of bipolar disorder, and neurological disorders or brain injury (where it is termed pseudobulbar affect), such as after a stroke. It has sometimes been found to have been a harbinger, or early warning, of certain forms of thyroid disease. Emotional lability also results from intoxication with certain substances, such as alcohol and benzodiazepines. It is also an associated feature of ADHD and autism.

== In children ==
Children who display a high degree of emotional lability generally have low frustration tolerance and frequent crying spells or tantrums. During preschool, ADHD with emotional lability is associated with increased impairment and may be a sign of internalizing problems or multiple comorbid disorders. Children who are neglected are more likely to experience emotional dysregulation, including emotional lability.

== Triggers ==
Potential triggers of emotional lability include excessive tiredness, stress or anxiety, overstimulated senses (too much noise, being in large crowds, etc.), being around others exhibiting strong emotions, very sad or funny situations (such as jokes, movies, certain stories or books), death of a loved one, or other situations that elicit stress or strong emotions.

== See also ==
- Emotional dysregulation
