= BJPsych Bulletin =

Psychiatry journal

- Discipline: Psychiatry
- Language: English
- Edited by: Andrew Forrester

Publication details
- Former names: The Psychiatric Bulletin; The Psychiatrist; Psychiatric Bulletin; Bulletin of the Royal College of Psychiatrists
- History: 1977–present
- Publisher: Cambridge University Press
- Frequency: Bimonthly
- Open access: Yes
- Impact factor: 2.9 (2025)

Standard abbreviations
- ISO 4: BJPsych Bull.

Indexing
- ISSN: 2056-4694 (print); 2056-4708 (web)
- LCCN: 2015243167
- OCLC no.: 907946383

Links
- Journal homepage; Online access; Online archive

BJPsych Bulletin is a bimonthly peer-reviewed open access medical journal covering psychiatry, especially issues relevant to the clinical practice of psychiatrists. It was established in 1977, as the Bulletin of the Royal College of Psychiatrists, and it was renamed the Psychiatric Bulletin in 1988. In 2010, it was renamed The Psychiatrist, and was published as The Psychiatric Bulletin during 2014 before acquiring its current title in 2015. It is published by Cambridge University Press on behalf of the Royal College of Psychiatrists, which owns the journal. The editor-in-chief is Andrew Forrester (Cardiff University).

The journal is abstracted or indexed in

- EMBASE
- PubMed Central
- Emerging Sources Citation Index
- Scopus
- PsycINFO
- Directory of Open Access Journals (DOAJ)
