= Flatau =

Flatau is a surname of people mostly of Polish and German origin. Notable people with the surname include:

- Alison Flatau, American aerospace engineer
- Edward Flatau, (1868–1932) Polish neurologist
- Joanna Flatau (1928–1999), Polish female psychiatrist
- Kazimierz Flatau (1910–2000), Polish harpsichordist, music critic, physicist and translator
- Theodor Simon Flatau (1860–1937), Prussian-German physician

== See also ==
- Flatow
