= Remak =

Remak is a surname. Notable people with the surname include:

- Ernst Remak (1849–1911), German neurologist, son of Robert Remak
- Joachim Remak (1920–2001), German-American historian of World War I
- Kimberly Remak, American politician
- Patricia Remak (born 1965), former Dutch politician
- Robert Remak (1815–1865), Polish/German neurologist, zoologist
- Robert Remak (1888–1942), German mathematician, son of Ernst Remak
- Zoltán Remák (born 1977), Slovak cyclist

== See also ==
- Remak Ramsay (born 1937), American actor
- Moses ben Jacob Cordovero, known as Ramak
- REMAK, the computer from the episode "Killer" of the British TV series The Avengers
- Remake
