= Emanuel Mendel =

German neurologist and psychiatrist (1839–1907)

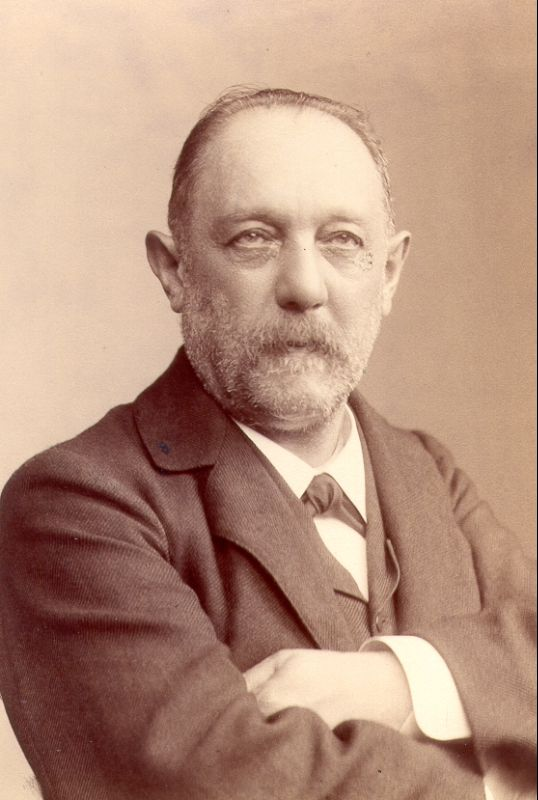
- Emanuel Mendel
- Born: October 28, 1839; Bunzlau, Lower Silesia; (today known as Bolesławiec, Poland)
- Died: June 23, 1907 (aged 67)
- Occupations: neurologist and psychiatrist
- Notable work: Introduction of duboisine as a treatment for Parkinson's disease

Emanuel Mendel (October 28, 1839 – June 23, 1907) was a German neurologist and psychiatrist who was a university professor (from 1884 an associate professor) and director of a polyclinic in Berlin. He was born in Bunzlau, Lower Silesia; (today known as Bolesławiec, Poland) into a Jewish family.

He studied medicine in Berlin and in 1871 received his habilitation for psychiatry. Mendel was an advocate in regards to the unification of psychiatry and neurology as complementary disciplines. Among his better-known students and assistants were Max Bielschowsky (1869–1940), Edward Flatau (1869–1932), Lazar Minor (1855–1942) and Louis Jacobsohn-Lask (1863–1940)

Mendel is remembered for the introduction of duboisine, an extract from the Australian plant Dubosia myoporoides, as a treatment for Parkinson's disease. Also, he conducted important studies of epilepsy and progressive paralysis.

Among his medical writings was a textbook on psychiatry titled Leitfaden der Psychiatrie für Studirende der Medizin (1902), later translated into English and published as "Text-book of psychiatry : A psychological study of insanity for practitioners and students". Also, he was founder and publisher of the neurological/psychiatric magazine Neurologisches Centralblatt.

His monograph, Die Manie – Eine Monographie was very influential to the study of mania and provided the first descriptions of hypomania. This work would later be built on by Emil Kraepelin on his texts on bipolar disorder, then called manic-depressive illness.

Mendel was interested in politics, and was a member of the Reichstag from 1877 to 1881.

== Notes ==
- Parts of this article are based on translations of articles from the German and Polish Wikipedia.
- E Mendel (1907). Text-book of psychiatry. Davis. "emanuel mendel."
