= Jean-François Heymans =

Belgian pharmacologist and physiologist

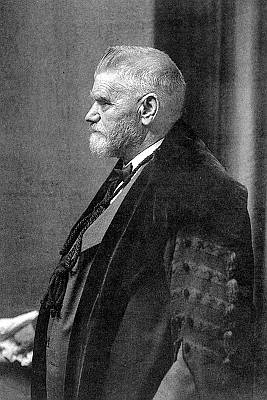
Jean-François Heymans

Jean-François Heymans, also Jan Frans Heymans (25 December 1859 in Gooik – 10 April 1932 in Middelkerke) was a Belgian pharmacologist and physiologist. He was the father of physiologist Corneille Jean François Heymans.

He received his education at the University of Leuven, where he earned doctorates in natural sciences (1884) and medicine (1887). From 1884 to 1887 he worked as a préparateur in the laboratory of physiology under Ernest Masoin. Afterwards, he travelled to Berlin, where he spent three years as an assistant to Emil Heinrich Du Bois-Reymond. In 1891 he was named professor of pharmacodynamics and general therapeutics at the University of Ghent. Here, he founded a laboratory for experimental pharmacology and therapeutics. He was rector of the university in 1923-1924.

His research included studies of myelinated and non-myelinated nerve fiber, the nervous system of the amphioxus, nerve endings of leeches, the influence of temperature on muscle contraction and on the detoxification of cyanide derivatives, to name a few.

With German neurophysiologist Johannes Gad, he published a textbook on physiology titled Kurzes Lehrbuch der Physiologie des Menschen. Also, he translated into French, Ewald and Munk's manual of dietetics as Alimentation de l'homme normal et de l'homme malade, traité de diététique a l'usage des médecins. In 1895, with French physiologist Eugène Gley, he founded the journal Archives Internationales de Pharmacodynamie et de Thérapie.
