= Johannes Gad =

German neurophysiologist

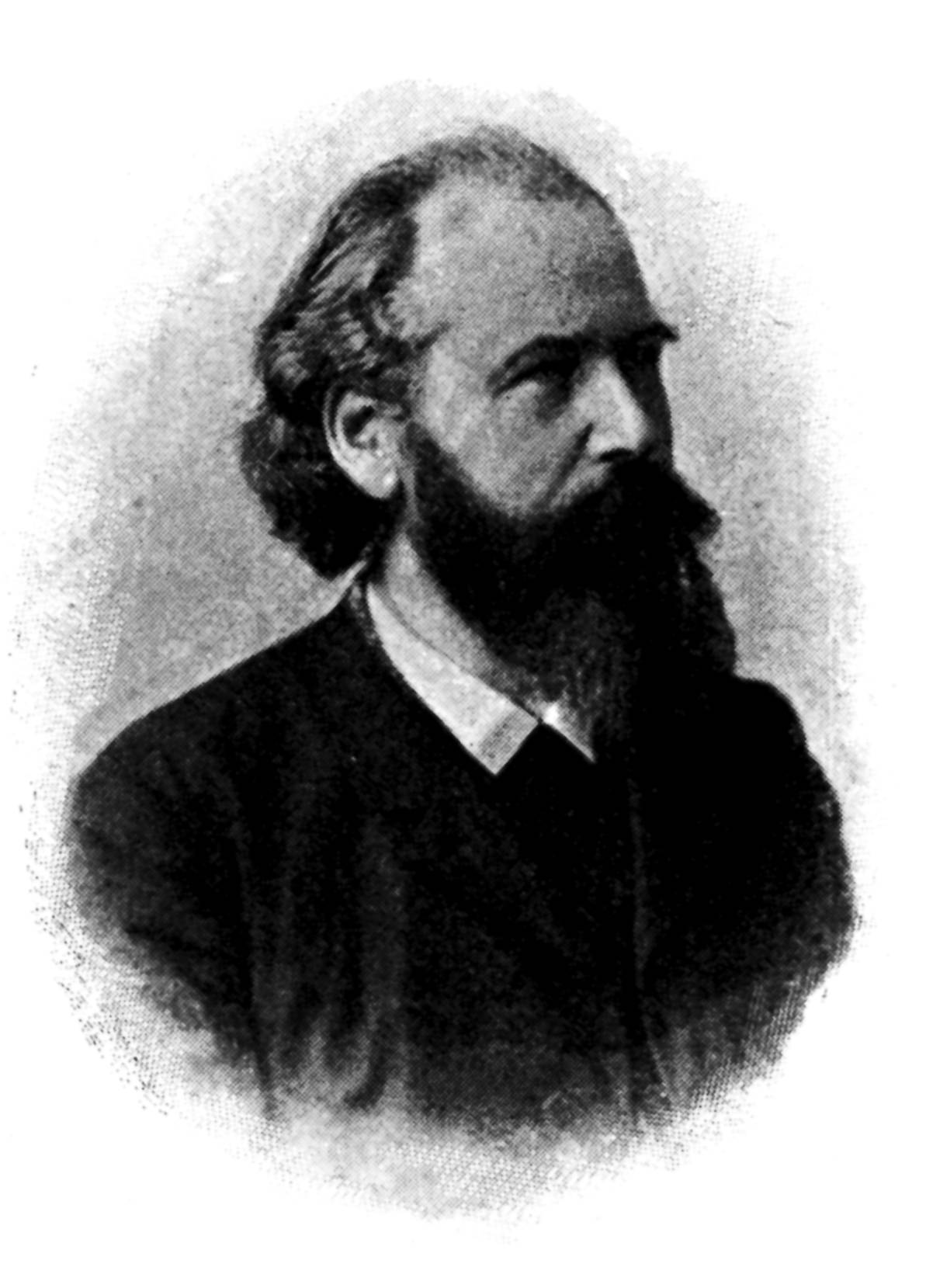
Johannes Gad (1842–1926)

Johannes Wilhelm Gad (30 June 1842 – 1926) was a German neurophysiologist who was a native of Posen. He was father-in-law to psychiatrist Oskar Kohnstamm (1871-1917).

== Life ==
He was an assistant to Emil du Bois-Reymond (1818–1896) at the physiological institute at the University of Berlin, and later worked under Adolf Fick (1829–1901) at the University of Würzburg. In 1893–1894 he was a visiting lecturer of physiology at Western Reserve University in Cleveland, Ohio, and after returning to Germany, became departmental head at the physiological institute in Berlin. In 1895 he succeeded Ewald Hering (1834–1918) as manager of the department of physiology at the University of Prague.

Gad is known from his work in experimental physiology. He performed numerous investigations involving electrophysiology, spinal cord functionality, the relationship between lactic acid to muscle contraction, et al. With Edward Flatau (1868–1932), he conducted experiments that were critical of Bastian-Bruns Law in regards to the loss of function following spinal cord injury.

Among his written works was a textbook on human physiology that he co-authored with pharmacologist Jean-François Heymans, called Kurzes Lehrbuch der Physiologie des Menschen, and a treatise on skin sensation that he published with Alfred Goldscheider (1858–1935), titled Ueber die Summation von Hautreizen. In 1887, with Sigmund Exner, he founded the periodical Centralblatt für Physiologie.
