= Minor's disease =

- Specialty: Neurology

Minor's disease, a syndrome involving the sudden onset of back pain and paralysis caused by haemorrhage into the spinal cord substance, was named after the Russian neurologist, Lazar Solomonovich Minor (1855–1942).

The term "Minor's syndrome" is now only rarely used in connection with his work and is increasingly being used, both inside and outside the medical profession, to refer to superior canal dehiscence syndrome (SCDS), first described in 1998 by Dr. Lloyd B. Minor of Johns Hopkins University, Baltimore, USA.
