= Alfred Goldscheider =

German neurologist (1858–1935)

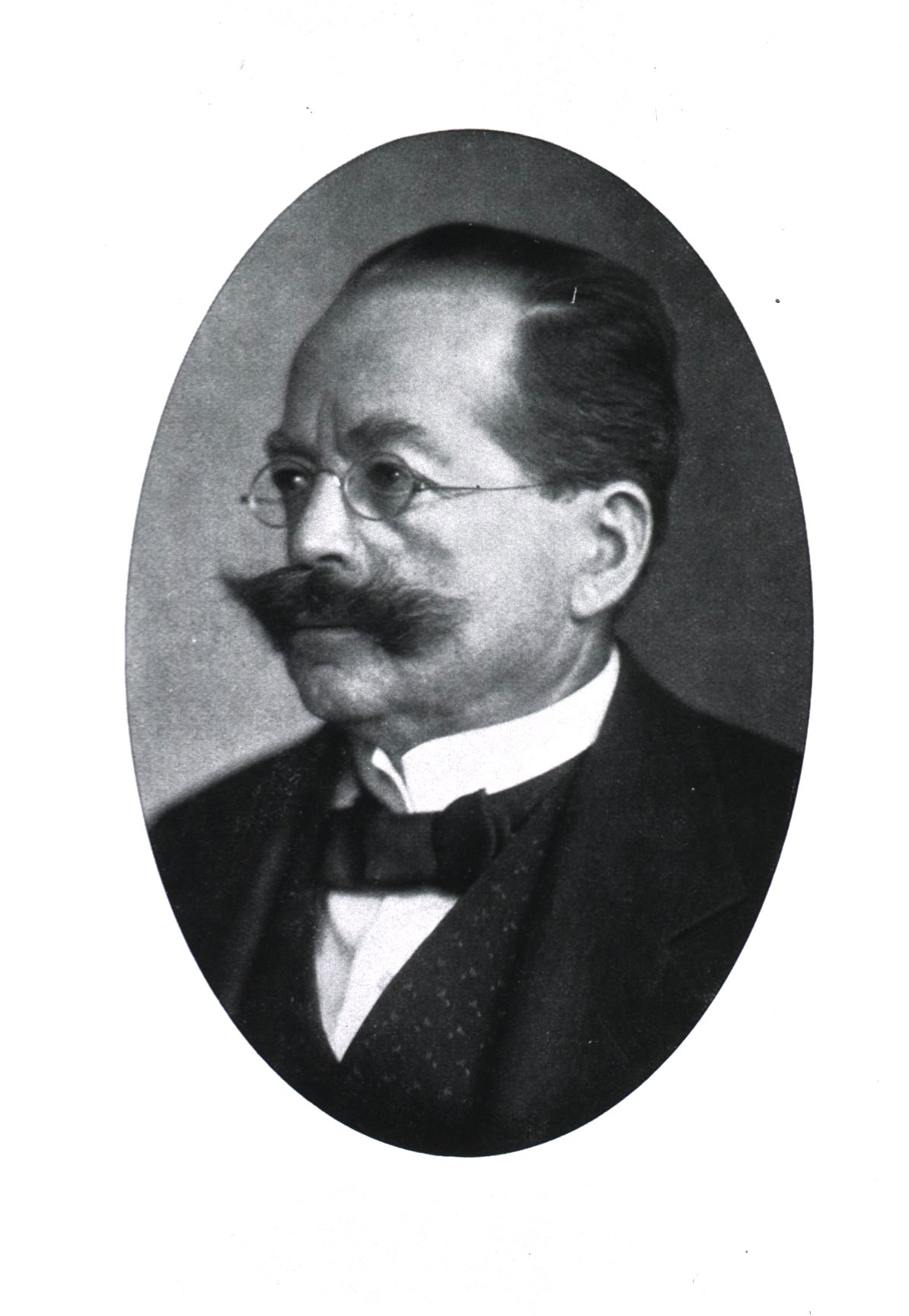
Alfred Goldscheider (1858-1935)

Johannes Karl Eugen Alfred Goldscheider (4 August 1858 – 10 April 1935) was a German neurologist born into a Jewish family in Sommerfeld, Kingdom of Prussia.

He studied medicine at Friedrich-Wilhelm Medical-Surgical Institute in Berlin (promotion 1881), and subsequently spent the next seven years as a military physician. During this period of time, he also served as an assistant to physiologist Emil du Bois-Reymond (1818-1896). He later became a professor at the University of Berlin.

In Berlin, he served as directing physician at the Krankenhaus Moabit (from 1894) and at the Virchow-Krankenhaus (from 1906). In 1910 he succeeded Hermann Senator at the polyclinic.

== Research ==
Goldscheider is best known for his work with the somatosensory system, in particular, research of the body's thermoreceptors in regards to localized "coolness" and "warmness" spots. He also performed research of localized tactile skin sensitivity that included tests involving "pain" and "tickle" sensations. The eponymous terms; "Goldscheider's test" and "Goldscheider's percussion" are derived from his research. During this time period (the early 1880s), Swedish physician Magnus Blix (1849-1904) of the University of Uppsala was performing similar tests, independent of Goldscheider.

In the late 1890s, with neurologist Edward Flatau (1868-1932), Goldscheider performed studies on the structure of nerve cells and their changes under different stimuli. Also, he is credited with describing the skin disorder, epidermolysis bullosa, a condition sometimes called "Goldscheider's disease".

Goldscheider died in Berlin.

== Selected works ==
- Die lehre von den specifischen energieen der sinnesnerven, 1881 – The doctrine associated with specific energies of the sensory nerves.
- Eine neue Methode der Temperatursinnprüfung, 1887 – A new method of temperature sensory testing.
- Diagnostik der nervenkrankheiten, 1893 – Diagnosis of diseases involving the nervous system.
- Gesammelte abhandlungen, 1898 – Collected memoirs.
- Physiologie der Hautsinnesnerven, 1898 – Physiology of skin sensory nerves.
- Normale und pathologische Anatomie der Nervenzellen auf Grund der neueren Forschungen, 1898 (with Edward Flatau) – Normal and pathological anatomy of nerve cells on the basis of recent research.
- Anleitung zur Übungs-Behandlung der Ataxie, 1899 – Instructions for exercise treatment of ataxia.
- Das Schmerzproblem, 1920 – Problems pertaining to pain.
