= Hermann Senator =

German physician (1834–1911)

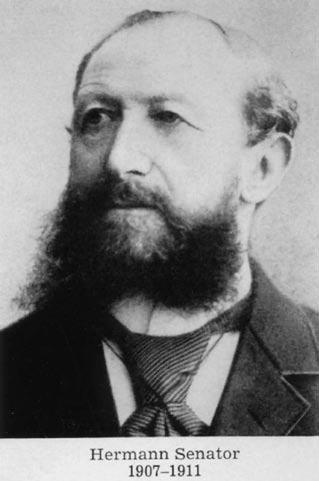
- Hermann Senator
- Born: 6 December 1834; Gnesen
- Died: 14 July 1911 (aged 76)
- Scientific career
- Fields: medicine

Hermann Senator (6 December 1834 – 14 July 1911) was a German medical doctor and professor. Though he is primarily remembered for his contributions to the field of nephrology, he was a "clinical all-rounder" who wrote about all aspects of internal medicine, including rheumatology, neurology, endocrinology, and pharmacology. He also made contributions to the field of forensic medicine.

Of Jewish descent, he was born in Gnesen, Grand Duchy of Posen, Kingdom of Prussia (now Gniezno, Poland). He began studying medicine in Berlin in 1853 and received his medical doctorate in 1857. Among his instructors in Berlin were Johannes Peter Müller, Johann Lukas Schönlein, and Ludwig Traube.

Senator was mentored in his early career by Johann Ludwig Casper. During the 1866 Austro-Prussian War, Senator was mobilised and served as an Assistenzarzt (medical corps equivalent of second lieutenant) in a barracks infirmary. Senator completed his habilitation in 1868. During the 1870–1871 Franco-Prussian War, he served as a Stabsarzt (medical corps equivalent of captain) in a large field hospital.

In 1875, he became chief physician in the internal medicine department at the Augusta-Hospital, and in 1881 became head physician at the Berlin Charité teaching hospital.

After the death of Friedrich Theodor von Frerichs in 1885, he served as head of the "first medical clinic" at Berlin for a few months. In 1888 his department at the Charité was made into the "third medical clinic", expanded and made a part of a policlinic with Senator as its director. Beginning in 1872 he was co-editor of "Centralblatt für die medizinischen Wissenschaften".

Hermann Senator made several contributions in internal medicine, in particular, involving research in the field of nephrology. He was the author of influential works associated with diabetes and albuminuria, and is credited with disproving the once-held belief that albuminuria was always a sign of primary kidney disease. His treatise on diseases of the kidneys, "Die Erkrankungen der Nieren", was included in Hermann Nothnagel's textbook of special pathology and therapy. Senator was also the author of a significant study on fevers, titled "Untersuchungen über den fieberhaften Process und seine Behandlung" (Investigations of the febrile process and its treatment).

In 1868 he introduced his theory of "autointoxication", of which he speculated that "self-infection" originating in the intestines could be a source of disease elsewhere in the human body. He also believed that autointoxication could be the root cause of certain mental disorders.

== Selected publications ==
- Untersuchungen über den fieberhaften Process und seine Behandlung.
- Die Krankheiten des Bewegungsapparates. Diabetes mellitus und insipidus (Diseases of the musculoskeletal system. Diabetes mellitus and diabetes insipidus. Included in Hugo Wilhelm von Ziemssen's "Handbuch der speciellen Pathologie und Therapie". 2nd edition, 1879.
- Die Albuminurie im gesunden und kranken Zustande. Berlin, A. Hirschwald, 1882, (Albuminuria in healthy and diseased states); translated into several foreign languages.
- Die Erkrankungen der Nieren. (Diseases of the kidneys) In: Carl Wilhelm Hermann Nothnagel's "Handbuch der speciellen Pathologie und Therapie".
- "Diseases of kidney and the spleen, hemorrhagic diseases". Philadelphia, 1905, (with Moritz Litten and Alfred Stengel).

== Sources ==
- Kaiser, H (Oct 2008). "[Hermann Senator (1834--1911). A clinical all-rounder with a special interest in rheumatology]". Zeitschrift für Rheumatologie. 67 (6). Germany: 516–22. doi:10.1007/s00393-008-0305-6. ISSN 0340-1855. PMID 18688622. S2CID 6012737.
- Hierholzer, Klaus; Hierholzer Johannes (2003). "Forgotten nephrologists: Leonhard Thurneysser and Hermann Senator". J. Nephrol. 16 (5). Italy: 760–5. ISSN 1121-8428. PMID 14733426.
