= Lazar Solomonovich Minor =

Russian neurologist (1855–1942)

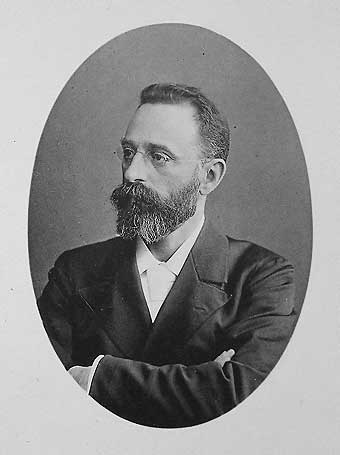
L. S. Minor

Lazar Solomonovich Minor (Russian: Ла́зарь Соломо́нович Минор; 17 December 1855 – 1942) was a Russian neurologist who was a native of Vilnius.

== Life ==
Minor received his education at the University of Moscow, where he was a student of Aleksei Kozhevnikov (1836–1902). Afterwards, he worked in Paris under Jean-Martin Charcot (1825–1893), and in Berlin with Carl Otto Westphal (1833–1890) and Emanuel Mendel (1839–1907). In 1884 he became a lecturer of neurology at the University of Moscow, and was later a co-founder of the Moscow Association of Neuropathologists and Psychiatrists.

Minor's name is associated with Minor's disease, a disorder involving a sudden attack of back pain and paralysis caused by hemorrhage into the spinal cord, and also "Minor's sign", a condition in which patients with lower back problems require support of the lower back in order to rise from a seated position. This sign is often indicative of sciatica, sacroiliac lesions or lumbosacral lesions.

Together with Edward Flatau (1868–1932) and Louis Jacobsohn-Lask (1863–1941), he published a textbook on the pathological anatomy of the nervous system called Handbuch der pathologischen Anatomie der Nervensystems.

Although not himself a communist nor even a political radical, Minor acknowledged the debt that ethnic Russian Jews owed to the Bolshevik government for tearing down prejudicial occupational barriers and opening up a new class of positions and promotions that were denied to Jews by the Tsarist regime. Minor stated, "though in the old Russia I could get no promotion for twenty years by reason of being a Jew, today I am not only a professor but also dean of the medical school. I am not a radical but I must acknowledge the debt of the Jews to the new rulers."
