= Berta Lask =

German writer, playwright and journalist

- Born: 17 May 1878; Wadowice, Kingdom of Galicia and Lodomeria, Austria-Hungary
- Died: 28 March 1967 (aged 88); East Berlin, East Germany
- Other name: Gerhard Wieland (pseudonym)
- Occupations: Author; Dramatist; Journalist
- Political party: KPD; SED
- Spouse: Louis Jacobsohn (1863–1940)
- Children: 4
- Parent(s): Leopold Lask (1841–1905); Cerline Lask (?-1921)

Berta Lask (German: [lask]; 17 November 1878 – 28 March 1967) was a German writer, playwright and journalist. She joined the Communist Party in 1923 and much of her published work is strongly polemical.

Sources identify her under several different names. Between her marriage to Louis Jacobsohn in 1901 and 1917 she used, for some purposes, the name Berta Jacobsohn. After the death of both her brothers in law, the couple changed their name to Jacobsohn-Lask. She also wrote under the pseudonym "Gerhard Wieland".

== Life ==
=== Provenance and early years ===
Berta Lask was born into a prosperous Jewish family in Wadowitz, a small industrialising town at that time in Galicia, and a short distance to the southwest of Kraków. She was the third of her parents' four recorded children. Her parents had grown up in the north of Germany, and despite living in Austria-Hungary still held Prussian nationality. Her father, Leopold Lask (1841–1905), owned a paper factory in Falkenberg, far to the north. Her mother, Cerline Lask (?-1921) was a teacher. The elder of her brothers, Emil Lask (1875–1915), would achieve eminence as a neo-Kantian philosopher.

In 1885 the family moved to Falkenberg in Brandenburg. Berta Lask attended primary school in Berlin and a secondary school (Gymnasium) in Bad Freienwalde, a short distance to the northeast of the capital. Her mother was dismissive of her wish progress with her education, and it was partly as a reaction against her mother's attitudes that Berta first made contact with political feminism. Through her brother Emil, three years her senior, she also came into contact with other intellectual currents of the time. In her late teens she began her first forays into serious writing. It was also during this period, in 1894/95, that she studied in Berlin with Helene Lange who was already gaining a reputation as a leading advocate of women's rights.

In 1901 Berta Lask married Louis Jacobsohn (1863–1940), a neurologist and histologist who was teaching at Berlin's Frederick-William University (as it was known at the time). During the next few years they had four recorded children. In 1912 her first unpublished stage work appeared under the title "Auf dem Hinterhof, vier Treppen links" ("In the backyard, four steps to the left").

=== War ===
Both her brothers were killed in the First World War.

Through her husband's work as a doctor Lask became increasingly radicalised, which formed the context for her activism in the women's movement and later her support for the October Revolution in Leningrad in 1917 and the November Revolution in Berlin in 1918. After the war, between 1919 and 1921 she entitled two volumes of poetry reflective of the war experience and the deaths of her own brothers entitled "Stimmen" ("Voices") and "Rufe aus dem Dunkel" ("Calls out of the dark"). Along with her poetry, she published articles for "The Red Flag" ("Die Rote Fahne") and other less high-profile revolutionary newspapers. In 1923 she joined the recently established Communist Party in Berlin. She provided material for the party's Agitation and Propaganda group. Her output included the chorus "The call of the dead — speaking chorus to commemorate Karl Liebknecht and Rosa Luxemburg" ("Die Toten rufen - Sprechchor zum Gedenken an Karl Liebknecht und Rosa Luxemburg"), the plays "Thomas Münzer" (1925) and "Leuna 1921" (1927, but first staged only in 1956), and children's books such as "Through Time on the Flying Horse" ("Auf dem Flügelpferde durch die Zeiten") and "How Franz and Greta traveled to Russia" ("Wie Franz und Grete nach Russland reisten"). She had made her own first visit to Russia in 1925.

=== Weimar years ===
During the Weimar period Berta Lask found herself before the judges charged with high treason several times. Her published plays were confiscated and performances of them banned. Her works also featured in trials launched against communist book sellers. In 1927, however, the cases against her failed. Along with Johannes R. Becher, Frida Rubiner, Franz Carl Weiskopf and others she was a member of the planning committee and a founder member of the Association of Proletarian-Revolutionary Authors ("Bund proletarisch-revolutionärer Schriftsteller" / BPRS) which they launched on 19 October 1928, with Lask becoming deputy secretary to the national executive in 1932. She was also a member of the Protection League of German authors ("Schutzverband deutscher Schriftsteller" / SDS). Her work by now was chiefly restricted to journalism.

=== Nazi years and Soviet exile ===
The Nazis took power in January 1933 and lost little time in converting the German state into a one-party dictatorship. Political activity (unless in support of the Nazi party) became illegal. Berta Lask was arrested and held in "protective custody" between March and June. After that, probably in August 1933 (though sources differ as to the precise dates) she emigrated via Czechoslovakia to the Soviet Union. She lived in Moscow at least till 1936, by which time all three of her sons and her husband had relocated from Nazi Germany to the Soviet Union. Her husband, who had been semi-retired even before the Nazi take-over, and had never involved himself in his wife's political activities (but was nevertheless professionally marginalised and in increasing danger because he was Jewish) arrived, using a tourist visa, only at the start of 1936, accompanied by her daughter in law, Dora and her baby granddaughter, Franziska.

In Moscow Berta Lask worked as a journalist. Moscow, like Paris, had welcomed large numbers of refugees from Nazi Germany, forced to flee because of their politics, their race, or both. There were several German language news publications following the Communist Party line, notably the Deutsche Zentral-Zeitung, published in Moscow by the German language section of the Comintern, and to which Lask contributed. She was also writing for "Zwei Welten" and for "Internationale Literatur" and contributing material to Radio Moscow. She published several books under the pseudonym "Gerhard Wieland". It has been suggested that she used a pseudonym partly in order to protect her sons and her husband all of whom had initially remained in Germany when Berta had fled. At some point after 1936 Louis and Berta left Moscow and settled at Sevastopol in Crimea where the authorities were happy for Louis to continue his work as a physician until his death in May 1940.

Berta Lask was deprived of her German citizenship by the government in 1938. She received Soviet citizenship in 1940.

Unlike their father, all three of the Lasks' sons had joined the German Communist Party by 1933. Of the three of them, the youngest, Ernst, stayed for a time in Berlin working "underground" for the Communist Party (which was now illegal). He was assigned to the party's "anti-militarist" department which was in effect a cover name for the German Communist Party's news service. He then fled, following his mother to Moscow, where he worked first for the Agriculture Institute and then for the International Economics and Politics Institute. However, at the end of June 1936, a month after his thirtieth birthday, Ernst died of tuberculosis in the First University Clinic in Moscow hospital. The other two, Hermann and Ludwig, were arrested in 1938, when the political purges in Moscow were still at their height. The middle son, Hermann, was banned to Arkhangelsk in the north where he lived with his widowed mother between 1941 and 1944. He was eventually transferred to the Soviet "Labor army", and returned to what remained in Germany in 1948. The eldest son is sometimes identified in sources as Ludwig and sometimes as Lutz. Lutz, who had a degree in human economics ("Volkswirtschaft"), was working at the Marx-Engels-Lenin Institute in Moscow when he was arrested. His detention included eight years in a camp at Kolyma in the Far East. Like his brother Hermann, he survived his time in the Soviet Union, but he was only permitted to return to Germany in 1953. After Lutz was arrested, his wife, Dora, keen to avoid getting caught up in Stalin's latest purge, left Moscow with their daughter Marianne (see the book Kafka's letzte Liebe by Kathi Diamant ). They crossed Europe and arrived in England towards the end of the summer of 1939. Having avoided imprisonment by the Soviets, in London Dora was identified as an enemy alien and imprisoned in Holloway jail, and then "interned" on the Isle of Man. By the end of the war she had been released, and lived in England for the rest of her life: she died from kidney disease in 1952, the year before the Soviets were finally persuaded to release her husband.

According to some sources, Berta Lask tried to return to Moscow from Arkhangelsk during the war in order to contribute to the struggle against Nazi Germany. In the end she appears to have returned to Moscow around the end of the war, possibly when her son was transferred from Arkhangelsk to the Soviet "Labor army". She then remained in Moscow till 1953. When she returned to the part of Germany which by this time had become the German Democratic Republic (East Germany), she was accompanied by her newly freed son, Lutz.

=== German Democratic Republic ===
Berta Lask lived her final years in East Berlin where she continued to write and was able to finish the semi-autobiographical novel on which she had started work in 1938. It was published asStille und Sturm in 1955. In 1958 she was honoured officially with the Patriotic Order of Merit in silver. The equivalent award in gold followed in 1963. She was a member of the East German literary elite, and the country's powerful Party Central Committee offered public condolences when she died on 28 March 1967.
