= Andrzej Samson =

Polish psychologist

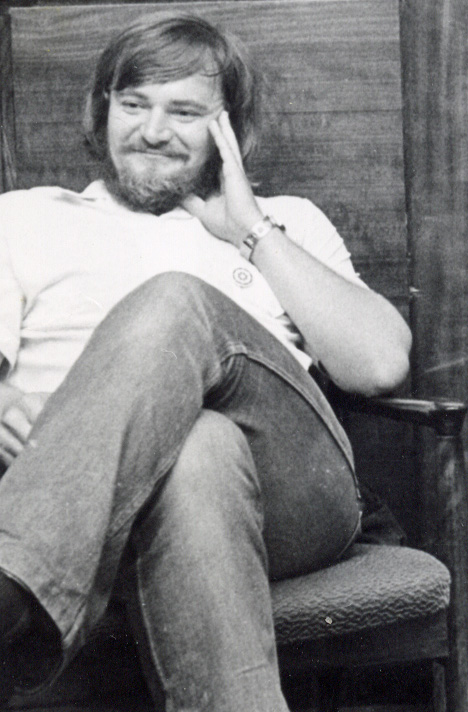
Andrzej Andrzej Samson in 1978 in Chłapowo, Poland where he served as the head of psychotherapy unit during health retreats of university students with nervous disorders.

Andrzej Samson (born 11 August 1947 Smugi, died 8 March 2009 Częstochowa) was a Polish psychologist, psychotherapist, one of the pioneers of psychotherapy in Poland.

== Life ==
Andrzej Samson graduated from the University of Warsaw Psychology Department in 1970. He worked and greatly contributed to the developing field of psychotherapy in Poland in the early 1970. Throughout the 1970s, he was associated with psychiatrists Kazimierz Jankowski and Joanna Flatau. Under Flatau, he worked as the head of a group of psychologists practicing psychotherapy for patients from Warsaw universities.

He wrote many influential psychology books on topics ranging from the survival in the school environment to marriage counseling. However, he achieved his fame during the rapid transition of Poland from the communist country to a young capitalistic country in the 1990s. This turbulent transition period created the need for explanation of the new reality and Samson belonged to a selected group of psychologists explaining it.

He published in the popular science journal Charaktery, gave numerous interviews, and offered advice. He was marriage councilor and worked with children. In one of the interviews during the late part of his life, while in jail, he considered Milton H. Erickson and Mara Selvini-Pallazoli as one of the most influential for his own development.

He played in the movie of Marcel Łoziński Jak Żyć (How to Live?).

Between 2004-2009, he was in jail and was prosecuted for pedophilia. He was accused of taking pictures of autistic children cross-dressed or seen keeping a vibrator. The children were his patients. His case was widely played in the media as an example of abuse of the public trust. Even though he was sentenced to 8 years in prison, the decision was overturned because he was accused for the same acts in two different cases. The case itself was not open to public and only the final sentence without the justification was made available. He was released from jail in 2009 on the ground of deteriorating medical condition and was awaiting another trial. He died before the re-trial in the apartment of his sister.

== Publications ==
- Andrzej Samson, Człowiek człowiekowi..., Instytut Wydawniczy Związków Zawodowych, 1989, ISBN 83-202-0745-2, ISBN 978-83-202-0745-3, 213 stron.
- Pomiędzy żoną i mężem, czyli jak przetrwać w małżeństwie (1995)
- Andrzej Samson, Jak przetrwać w małżeństwie, "Twój Styl", 2001, ISBN 83-7163-304-1, ISBN 978-83-7163-304-1
- Andrzej Samson, Zawód psycholog, Laboratorium Psychologii Stosowanej, 1996, ISBN 83-901281-1-X, 9788390128115
- Andrzej Samson, Książeczka dla przestraszonych rodziców czyli Co robić, gdy twoje dziecko zachowuje się dziwnie, niepokojąco, nietypowo, Jacek Santorski & Co Wydawnictwo, 2001, ISBN 83-86821-98-1, ISBN 978-83-86821-98-3
- Andrzej Samson, Moje dziecko mnie nie słucha, Wydawnictwo Książkowe "Twój Styl", 1999, ISBN 83-7163-160-X, 9788371631603.
- Andrzej Samson, Mit szczęśliwego dzieciństwa, Twój Styl, 2000, ISBN 83-7163-171-5, ISBN 978-83-7163-171-9
- Melanie McFadyean, Michał Lipszyc, Andrzej Samson, Narkotyki: wiedzieć więcej: praktyczny przewodnik dla zaniepokojonych rodziców, Wydawn. Emblemat, 2000, ISBN 83-87626-21-X, 9788387626211
- Andrzej Samson, Być uczniem i przetrwać czyli Szkoła przeżycia szkoły, MCDN, 2001, ISBN 83-88618-06-7, ISBN 978-83-88618-06-2
- Wojciech Eichelberger, Andrzej Samson, Anna Sosnowska, Dobra miłość: co robić, by nasze dzieci miały udane życie, Ego Dom Wydawniczy, 2003, ISBN 83-917171-0-0, ISBN 978-83-917171-0-3
- Wojciech Eichelberger, Andrzej Samson, Anna Jasińska, Dobre rozmowy: które powinny odbyć się w każdym domu, Ego, 2003, ISBN 83-917171-2-7, ISBN 978-83-917171-2-7, 296 stron.
- Andrzej Samson, 20 tysięcy godzin w budzie: o szkole, uczniowskim losie i paru innych sprawach, Jacek Santorski & Co, 2003, ISBN 83-88875-79-5, ISBN 978-83-88875-79-3.
- Andrzej Samson, Miska szklanych kulek: powieść, Wydawnictwo Jacek Santorski, 1999, ISBN 83-86821-74-4, ISBN 978-83-86821-74-7, 230 stron.
