= Samuel Goldflam =

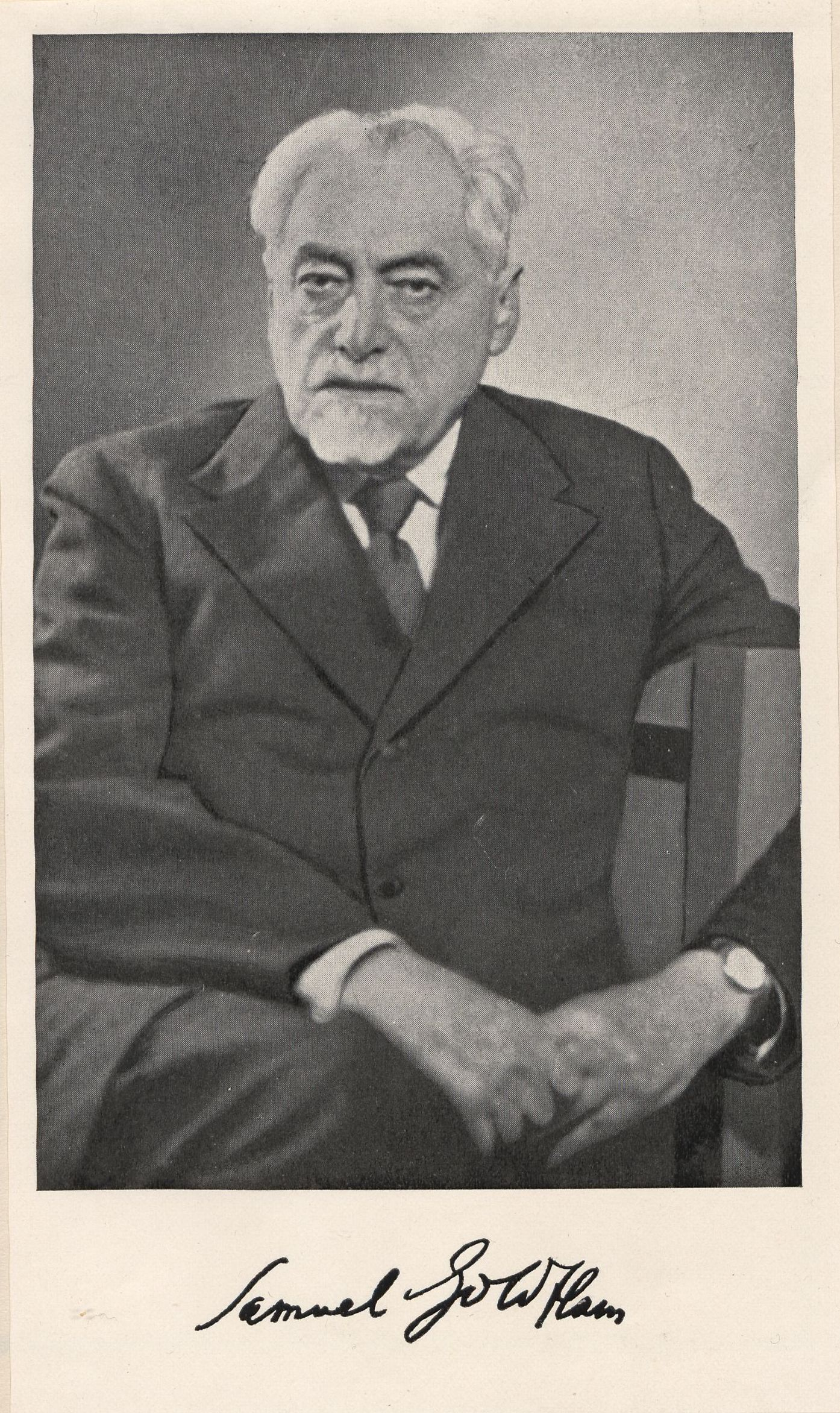
- Born: 15 February 1852; Warsaw, Congress Poland
- Died: 26 August 1932 (aged 80); Otwock, Poland
- Occupation(s): Neurologist, best known for his brilliant 1893 analysis of myasthenia gravis (Erb-Goldflam syndrome).

Samuel Wulfowicz Goldflam (15 February 1852 – 26 August 1932) was a Polish-Jewish neurologist best known for his brilliant 1893 analysis of myasthenia gravis (Erb-Goldflam syndrome).

== Biography ==
Goldflam received his education in his native city of Warsaw. He graduated from secondary school in 1869, then studied medicine at Warsaw University. He qualified as a physician in 1875, then worked in internal medicine at Holy Ghost Hospital under Professor Wilhelm Dusan Lambl (1824-95), known for the giardia parasite, Lamblia intestinalis. Lambl was not much of a mentor, so Goldflam worked largely by himself. His position at the internal-medicine clinic supplied him with ample research material. At that time, both internal-medicine and neurology patients were seen at Lambl’s clinic.

In 1882 Goldflam studied with the famous neurologists Karl Friedrich Otto Westphal (1833-90) and Jean-Martin Charcot (1825-93), then returned to Warsaw to teach neurology in the manner of the great masters. After a new period in Lambl’s clinic at Holy Ghost Hospital, he established his own clinic at Graniczna Street, no. 10, in Warsaw, for underprivileged patients, which he ran for nearly 40 years.

During World War I, Goldflam worked as a volunteer in the Jewish Hospital with his great friend, the neurologist, Edward Flatau (1869-1932). During the war he was one of the first to notice a correspondence between malnourishment and diseases, and he documented a bone and joint disease under the name osteoarthropathia dysalimentaria (1918). His main interest, however, was in the significance of reflexes, the neurological aspects of syphilis, and eye reflexes.

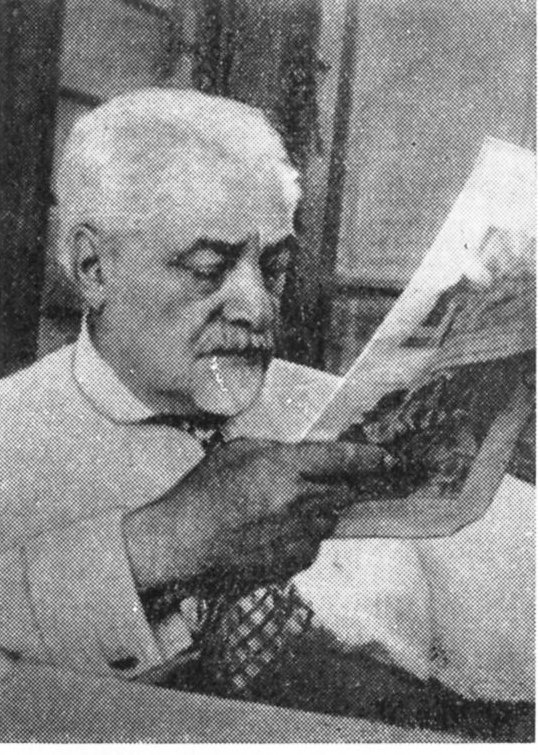
Samuel Goldflam

Goldflam was a sharp clinician with the ability to recognize small clues of illness which often escaped the attention of his colleagues. He not only worked with patients but was a pathologist. His profound observations and publications were recognized in Poland and abroad.

Goldflam established the Jewish Society for Mental Disorders and established the „Sophia” clinic for mental patients in Otwock, as well as the Berson and Bauman Children’s Hospital in Warsaw. Together with Flatau he established the Pathology Scientific Institute and the medical periodical Warszawskie Czasopismo Naukowe. Goldflam was a full member of the Warsaw Scientific Society (Towarzystwo Naukowe Warszawskie). Together with Janusz Korczak and Gerszon Lewin, he helped many social causes.

A genius in neurology, Goldflam was also an artist and an expert on Beethoven, and he helped many aspiring artists, including Artur Rubinstein, to establish their careers. He died in 1932, the same year as two other great Polish neurologists, Edward Flatau and Joseph Babiński.

== Sources ==
- E.J. Herman, History of Polish Neurology (in Polish), Wrocław, Polish Academy of Sciences, 1975.

== See also ==
- List of Poles
