= Eugène Gley =

French physiologist and endocrinologist

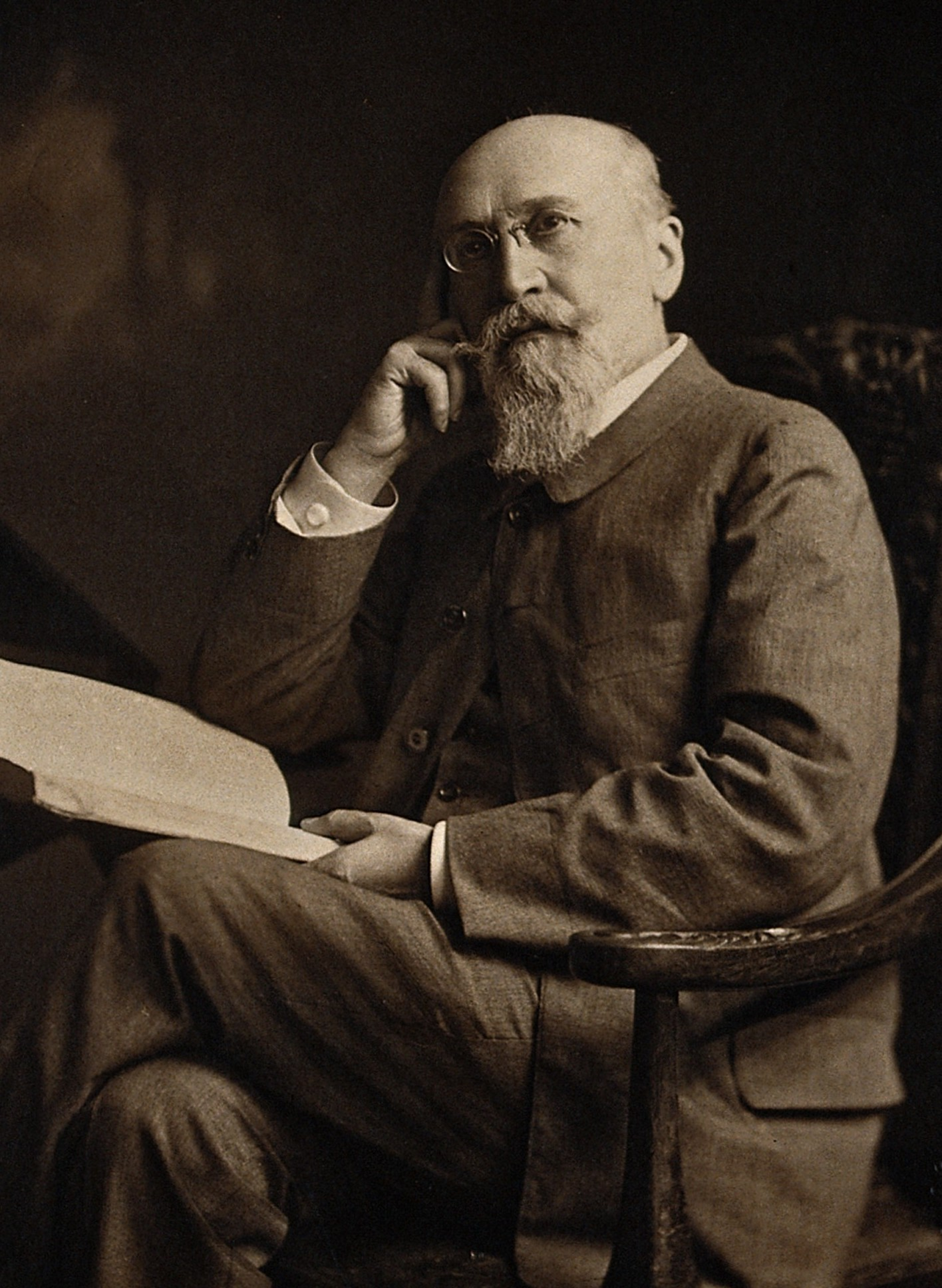
Eugène Gley

Marcel Eugène Émile Gley (French: [glɛ]; 18 January 1857 – 24 October 1930) was a French physiologist and endocrinologist born in Épinal, Vosges.

He studied physiology with Henri-Étienne Beaunis at the medical school in Nancy, and afterwards worked as an assistant to Étienne-Jules Marey (1830–1904) in Paris. Later on, he received the title of professeur agrégé, and in 1908 became a professor at the Collège de France. He was a member of the Académie de Médecine and secretary general of the Société de Biologie. He was a colleague to Charles Richet (1850–1935), and with Richet, published the Journal de physiologie et de pathologie générale. With Belgian pharmacologist Jean-François Heymans, he founded the journal Archives Internationales de Pharmacodynamie et de Thérapie (1895).

In 1891 Gley was the first to discover the importance of the parathyroid glands, which are four (or more) small endocrine glands lying close or embedded in the posterior surface of the thyroid gland. These glands had been recently discovered as an anatomical entity in 1880, however their importance was not understood at the time. Gley realized that the cause of tetany after thyroid operations was the inadvertent destruction of the parathyroid glands. He demonstrated this by removing the parathyroid glands from laboratory animals and witnessing their deaths from tetany. Because of his discovery, parathyroid glands have sometimes been referred to as "Gley's glands".

In his studies of the thyroid, he discovered that there was much more iodine in thyroid tissue than in the parathyroid, and noticed that when the thyroid is removed, a disturbance of iodine metabolism occurs.

== Bibliography ==
- Journal of Endochrinology: Parathyroid Hormone: Past and Present
- Parts of this article are based on a translation of an equivalent article at the French Wikipedia.
