= Edward Flatau =

Polish neurologist (1868–1932)

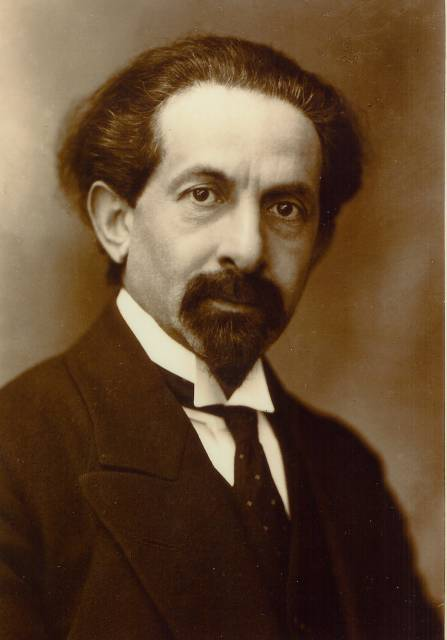
- Born: 27 December 1868; Płock, Congress Poland
- Died: 7 June 1932 (aged 63); Warsaw, Poland
- Education: University of Moscow
- Occupation: Neurologist

Edward Flatau (27 December 1868 – 7 June 1932) was a Polish neurologist and psychiatrist. He was a co-founder of the modern Polish neurology, an authority on the physiology and pathology of meningitis, co-founder of medical journals Neurologia Polska (translation: Polish Neurology) and Warszawskie Czasopismo Lekarskie (translation: Warsaw Medicinal Journal), and member of the Polish Academy of Learning.

His name in medicine is linked to Redlich-Flatau syndrome, Flatau-Sterling torsion dystonia (type 1), Flatau-Schilder disease, and Flatau's law. His publications greatly influenced the developing field of neurology. He published a human brain atlas (1894), wrote a fundamental book on migraine (1912), established the localization principle of long fibers in the spinal cord (1893), and with Sterling published an early paper (1911) on progressive torsion spasm in children and suggested that the disease has a genetic component.

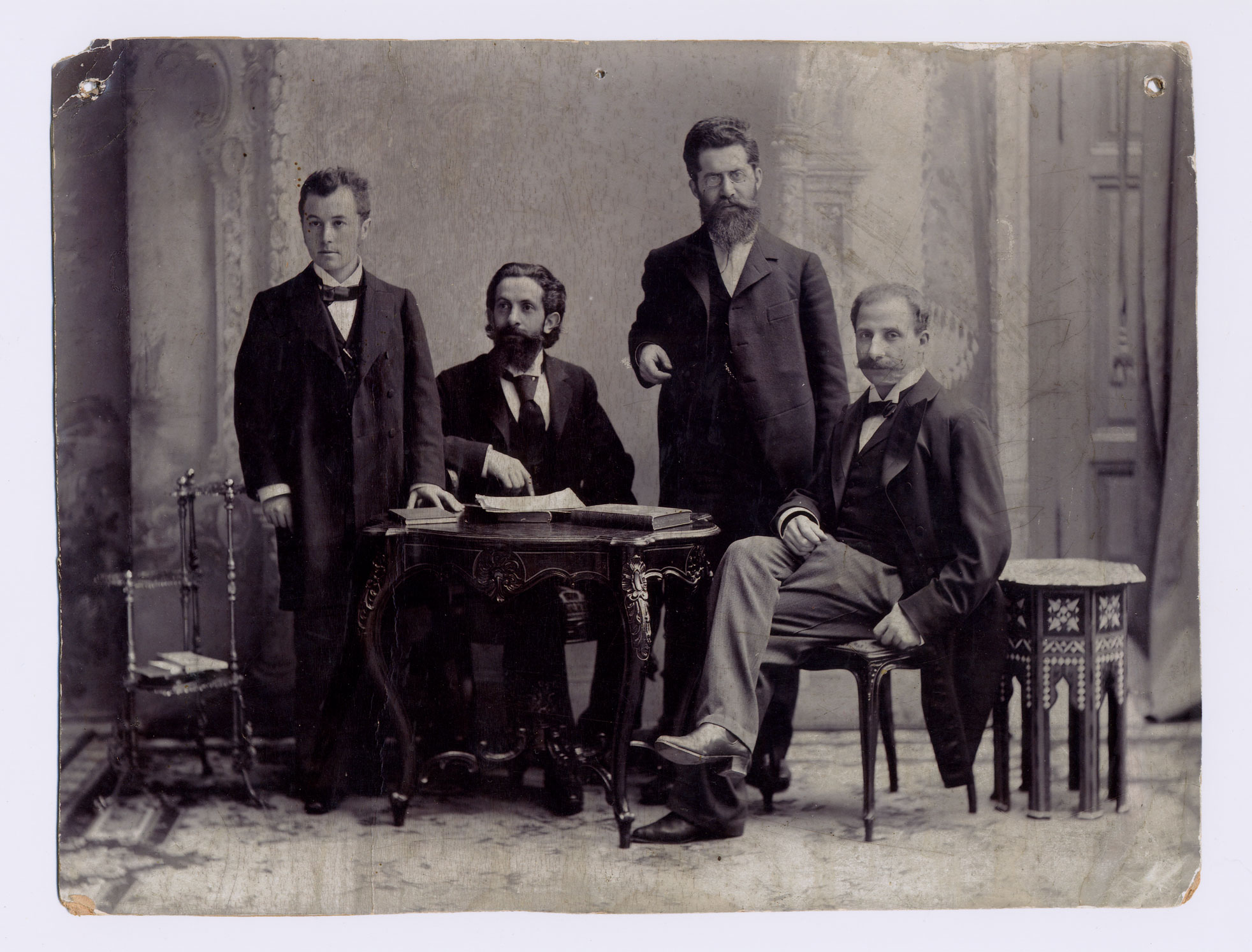
Left Siegfried Kalischer, Edward Flatau (points to a book), Louis Jacobsohn-Lask, Bernhard Pollack, around 1900 in Berlin

== Life ==
He was born in 1868 in Płock, the son of Anna and Ludwik Flatau of an assimilated Jewish family. In 1886, he graduated from high school (gymnasium) in Płock (now Marshal Stanisław Małachowski High School, Płock, also known as "Małachowianka"). From 1886, Flatau attended medical school at the University of Moscow, where he graduated eximia cum laude. In Moscow, he was greatly influenced by the psychiatrist Sergei Sergeievich Korsakoff (1854–1900) and the neurologist Alexis Jakovlevich Kozhevnikof (1836–1902). Flatau became a medical doctor in 1892. He spent the years 1893–1899 in Berlin in the laboratories of Emanuel Mendel (1839–1907) and at the University of Berlin under Wilhelm von Waldeyer-Hartz (1836–1921). During that time, he worked together with Alfred Goldscheider (1858–1935), Ernst Viktor von Leyden (1832–1910), Hermann Oppenheim, Louis Jacobsohn, Ernst Remak, and Hugo Liepmann. Though he was offered a position of professorship of neurology in Buenos Aires, he returned to Poland and in 1899 settled in Warsaw. He was married twice. He had two daughters, Anna and Joanna Flatau. His first wife Zofia and daughter Anna are described in a book by Antoni Marianowicz. Some stories about his personal life are printed in reminiscences of Wacław Solski and Ludwik Krzywicki.

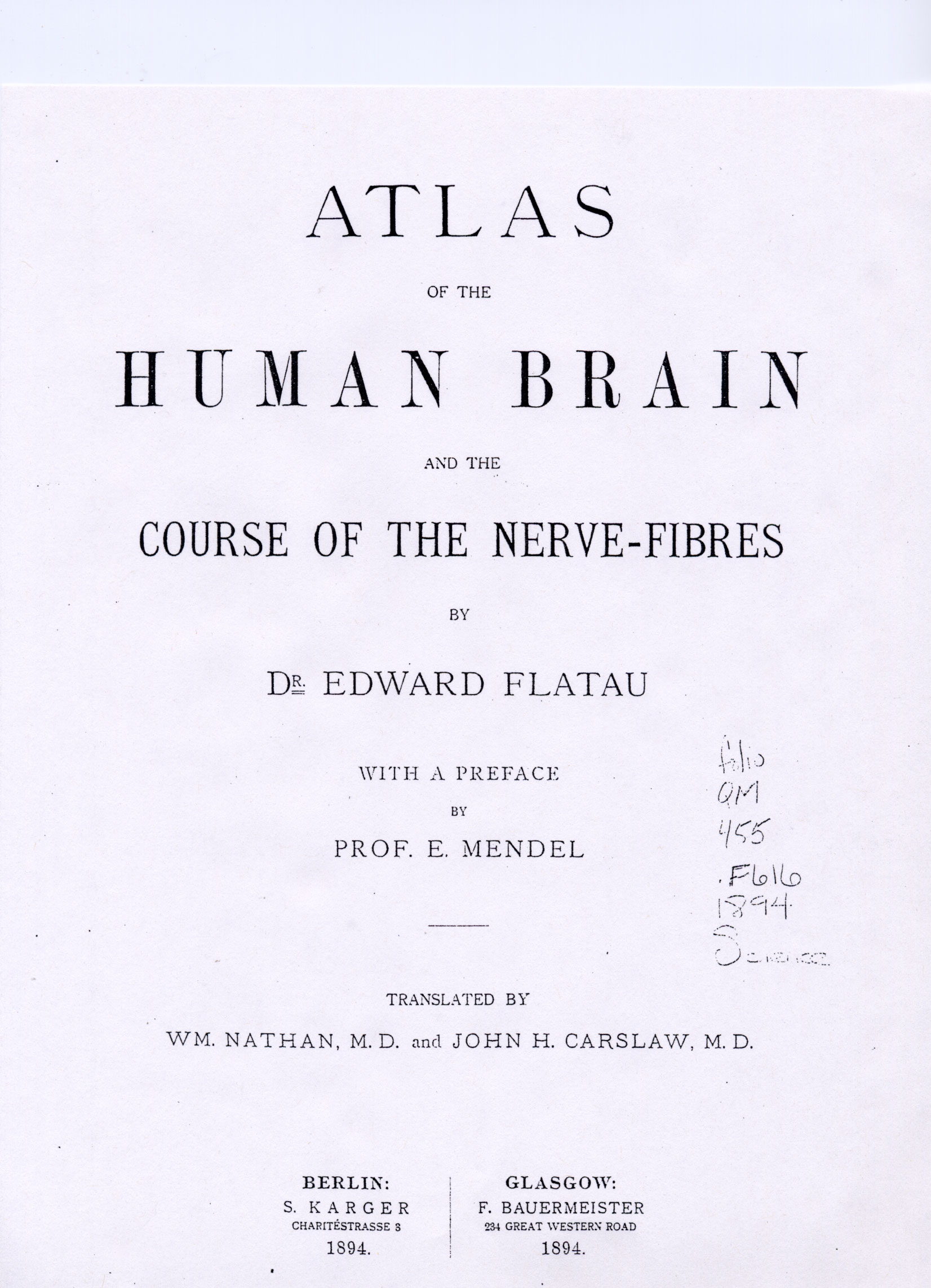
First page of Atlas of the human brain and the course of the nerve-fibres (1894)

== Scientific accomplishments ==
Flatau dealt with the diagnosis and treatment of diseases of the brain, treatment of muscle diseases, child neurology, peripheral nerve surgery, anatomy of the nervous system, histopathology of the nerve tissue, experimental oncology, neurophysiology, and nervous system pathophysiology. His scientific career is described in number of works. The most comprehensive are biographies written in Polish by his pupil and subsequent professor of neurology in the postwar Poland, Eugeniusz Herman. Other Polish publications include Besides these contributions there are several written in English and German A good source of information is the Jubilee Book of Edward Flatau (written in German, French and Polish), published during his lifetime, which contains contributions from his scientific collaborators as well as a bibliography and biography written by his student Maurycy Bornsztajn. In 1937 Warszawskie Czasopismo Lekarskie published special edition devoted to Flatau contributed mostly by his pupils.

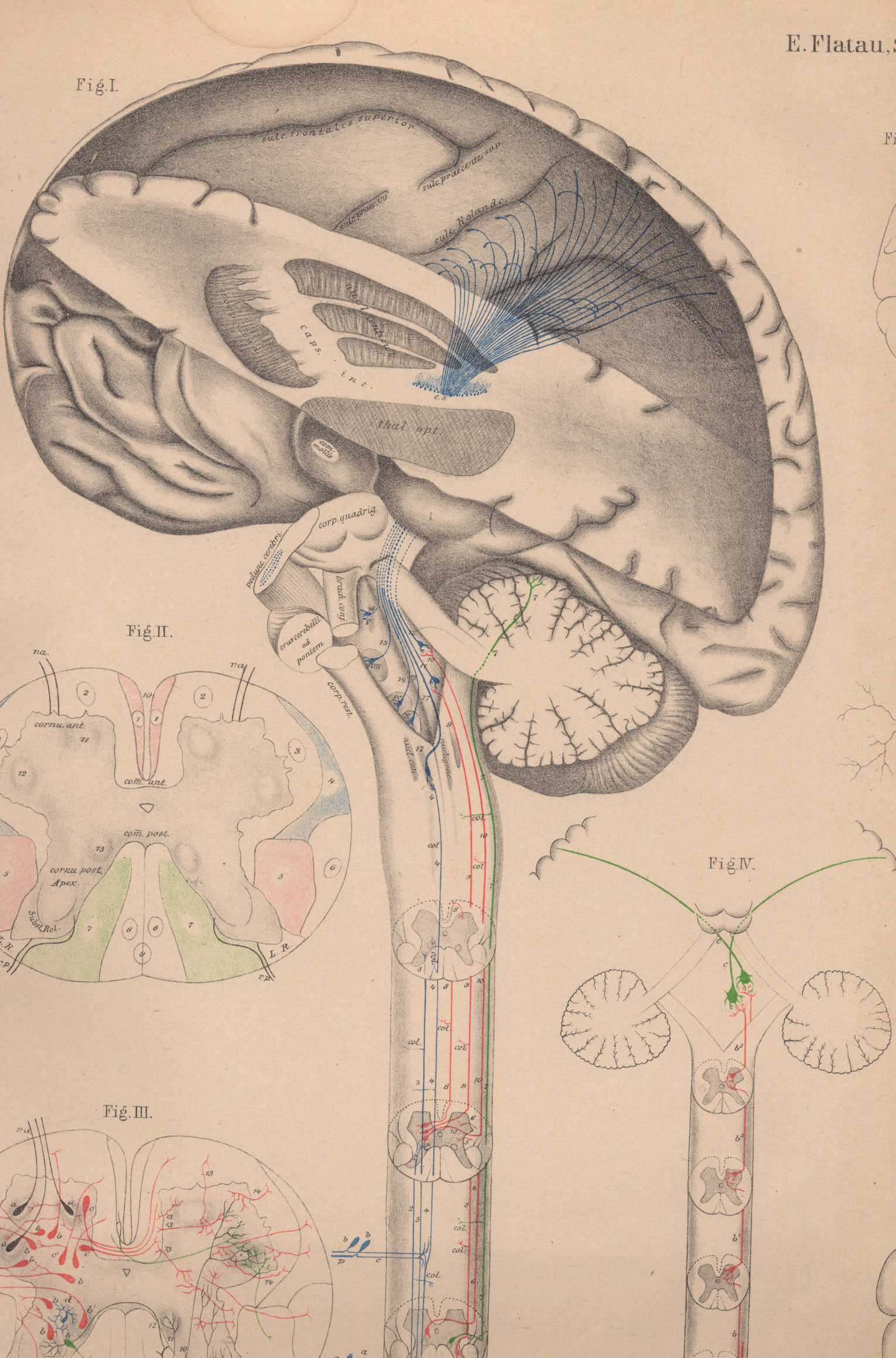
Template from the English edition of the brain atlas

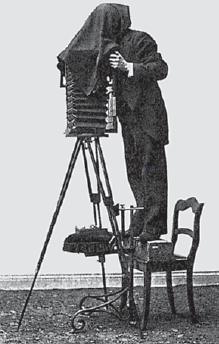
Edward Flatau is preparing pictures for his brain atlas.

=== Brain atlas and spinal cord ===
In 1894, at the age of 26, he published the influential Atlas of the Human Brain and the Course of the Nerve-Fibres, which was published in German, English, French, and Russian and, in 1896, in Polish. The Polish edition was dedicated "To the memory of a noble man and an eminent physician, Professor Tytus Chałubiński author dedicates this work." The atlas was based on long-exposure photographs of fresh brain sections (up to 10 minutes for flat and 30 minutes for uneven surfaces, by means of small diaphragms). These studies were done in Berlin under Professor Emanuel Mendel. In a review, Sigmund Freud wrote: "The plates with their clarity deserve to be called excellent educational material, suitable as an utterly reliable reference. A schematic plate in the beginning gives an overview of our knowledge on the fibre pathways in the CNS, incorporating the accounts of Mendel, Bechterew and Edinger and continuing with the differing views on the structure of nervous tissue of Camillio Golgi and Santiago Ramón y Cajal. The price of the work is minimal if one considers its completeness and beauty. The author and publisher deserve thanks from the medical community for this valuable work." In 1899, he published the second edition, which was extended and composed of two parts: an atlas and supplement. The preface to the second edition and supplement was written by Edward Flatau in Warsaw. In the second edition, Flatau added the description of his discovery on Das Gesetz der excentrischen Lagerung der langen Bahnen im Ruckenmark. Flatau's brain atlas was published two years before the work Das Menschenhirn of Gustaf Retzius, but the first publication of images of the brain was the work of Jules Bernard Luys in 1873. Sigmund Freud and Edward Flatau were together editors of the magazine Annual report on progress in neurology and psychiatry in 1897. Both were at the time neurologists.

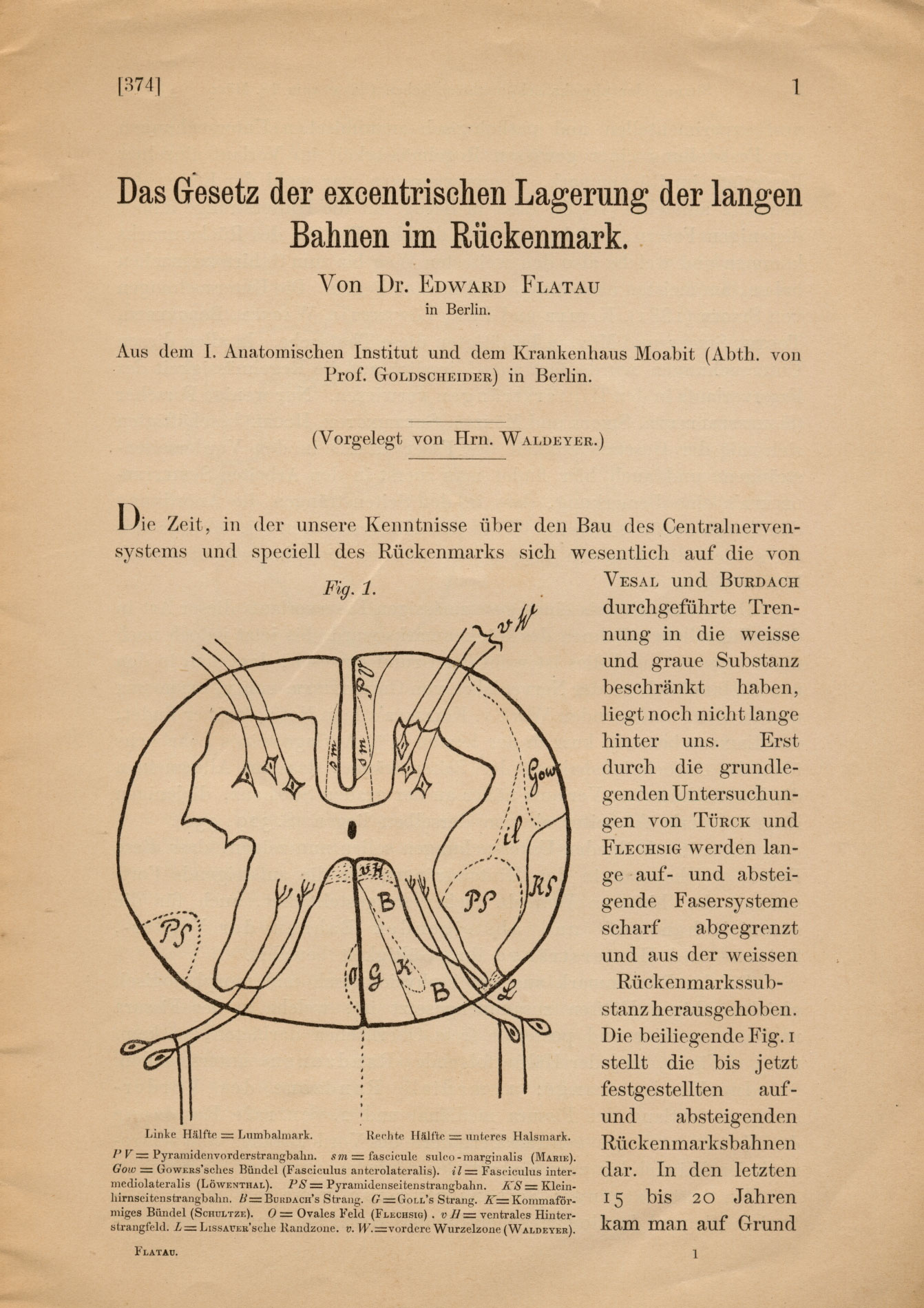
First page of Das Gesetz der excentrischen Lagerung der langen Bahnen im Ruckenmark (1897)

=== Flatau's Law ===
His law played an important role in the initial studies of the spinal cord. With the Berlin neurobiologist Johannes Gad, Flatau performed experiments on dogs and criticized the Bastian-Bruns law concerning the loss of function following spinal cord injury (1893). On the basis of numerous clinical spinal cord surgeries, experiments, and subsequent observations, he discovered that the "greater the length of the fibres in the spinal cord, the closer they are situated to the periphery" (Flatau's law). He provided evidence for the laminar arrangement of spinal pathways. He also described the fifth, seventh, and eighth cranial nerves, and carefully outlined their nuclei. The paper on this topic, Das Gesetz der excentrischen Lagerung der langen Bahnen im Rückenmark, was published in 1897. For this work he received a PhD in medical sciences in Moscow in 1899 (dissertation Zakon ekstsentricheskago raspolozheniia dlinnykh putei v spinnom mozgu). This work was presented in 1949, next to a portrait of the author, on display at the IV International Congress of Neurologists in Paris.

=== The neuron theory ===
Flatau began working at the Center for Anatomy of the Charité in Humboldt University of Berlin two years after the Wilhelm Waldeyer introduced the term neuron (Heinrich Waldeyer himself advocated and popularized the work of Ramón y Cajal). Thus, in 1895, Flatau became interested in neuron theory recently developed by Ramón y Cajal and Heinrich Waldeyer, and became one of its proponents. In several publications, he attempted to establish a unity between the physiology and anatomy of the neuron. Together with Alfred Goldscheider, he worked on the structure of nerve cells and their changes under mechanical, thermal, and toxic influences. They published results of their experiments in 1897 and 1898 in Fortschritte der Medizin and Polish Gazeta Lekarska, which were subsequently published as a special monograph. They state that the character of changes in neuron cells could provide information about the type of influences acting on them. This work, in which the normal and pathologic anatomy of the V, VII, and VIII (cochlear) cranial nerves was included, created much discussion and was adversely criticized by Franz Nissl, who opposed the neuron theory.

He modified Golgi's method of tissue staining and on the basis of studies of physiological effects of transverse intersection of the spinal cord in dogs carried out together with Johannes Gad, he provided criticism of the Bastian–Bruns sign of disappearance Patellar reflex as a result of this treatment (1896).

Together with his friend Louis Jacobsohn-Lask, he continued anatomy work. In 1895 and 1896, Flatau and Jacobsohn received 1500 marks from Duchess Louise von Bose, probably to develop a presentation for an international medical congress in Moscow in 1897. Along with Jacobsohn, Flatau wrote a well-known textbook of comparative anatomy of the nervous system of mammals (1899).

In 1906, he visited the Munich psychiatric clinic of Emil Kraepelin.

In 1910 and 1911, he wrote three chapters on tumors of the brain and spinal cord for the two volumes of the handbook edited by the Berlin neurologist Max Lewandowsky.

Together with the Warsaw surgeon Bronislaw Sawicki, he published a work on surgery of the spinal-cord cysts and treatment of tumors of the spine, in which he pointed out histopathological issues important for the surgical procedure. This publication was the culmination of several years of cooperation between the two doctors.

Flatau was the first in Poland to describe the cases of encephalitis lethargica and on occasion the name "Economo-Flatau disease" was used to identify this disease in Polish medical literature.

=== Neurology and early human genetics ===
In 1911, Flatau and Wladyslaw Sterling published an article on progressive torsion spasm in children. The authors pointed out that the disease was associated with genetic factors. In the same year, Theodor Ziehen and Hermann Oppenheim published a paper claiming that dystonia is related to a disease of the muscles. However, Flatau and Sterling noted that the intellectual capacity of these patients was higher than average. In 1976, Eldridge suggested that the publication of Flatau and Sterling was one of the first to describe the genetic factors of neurological diseases.

In 1927, Flatau, independently of Emil Redlich in Vienna, described the first cases of encephalomyelitis epidemica disseminata (Flatau-Redlich disease). Flatau was convinced that this illness is caused by a virus, which was later confirmed by Mergulis. In 1925, Flatau described in detail Schilder disease and suggested new name "encephaloleukopathia scleroticans progressive". Between 1921 and 1923, he described the meningeal symptoms characteristic during tuberculosis-related inflammation of meningitis: namely, the pupil extension when bending head and erection of the penis during repeated bending of the torso forward.

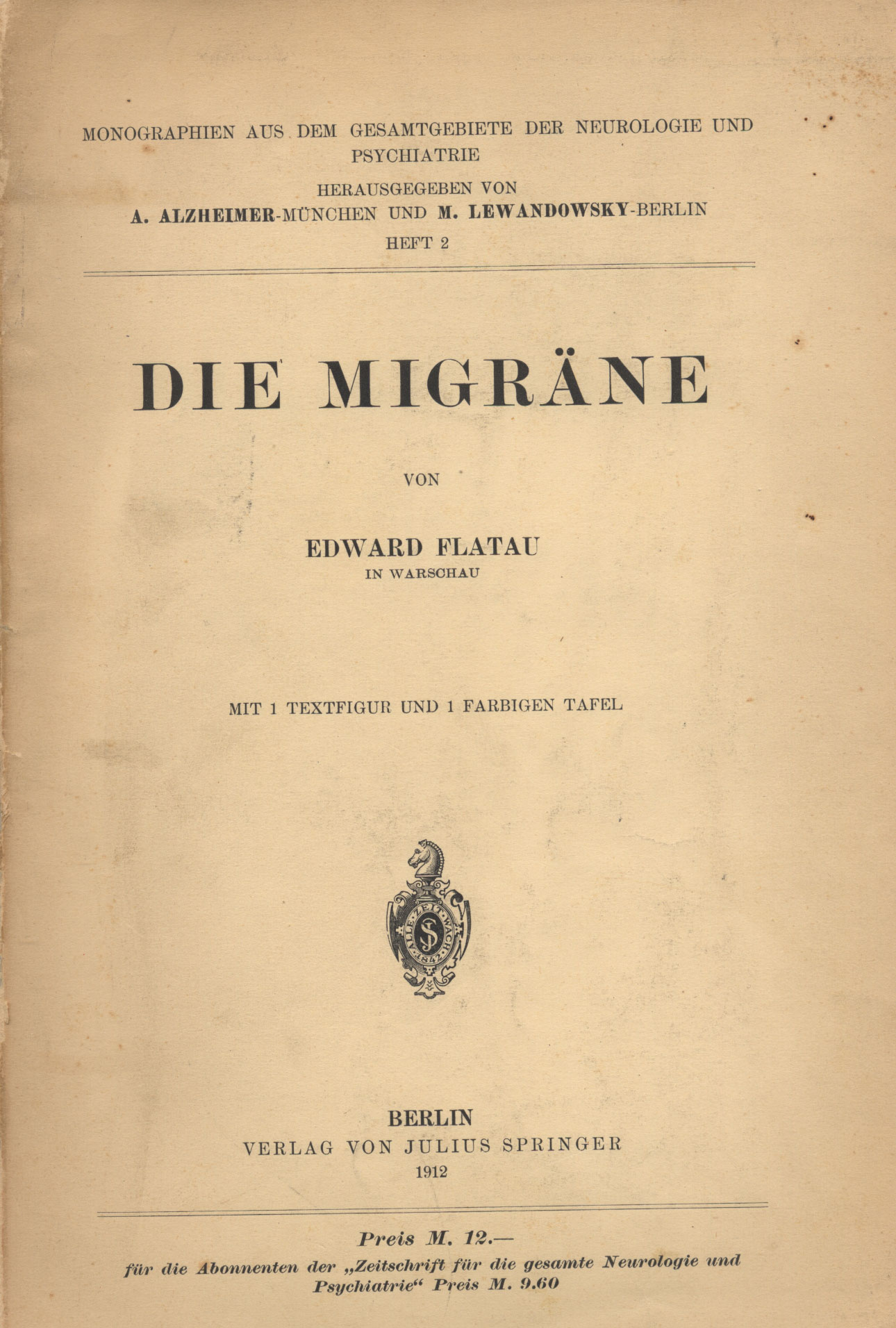
German edition of 1912 Die Migrane, one of the first modern books on migraine headaches in 20th century

=== Migraine and headaches ===
In 1912, he published in German and Polish one of the first modern monographs in the 20th century about migraine headaches which is still referenced in scientific literature. It was the first Polish textbook devoted to migraine. In a review of the historical background of general aspects of the headaches, Isler and Rose say, "His unique monograph of 1912, Die Migrane, contains a thoroughly structured survey of most earlier authors, precise clinical observations, a critical evaluation of pathophysiology, and uncritical opinions on treatment, including arsenic cures." In his monograph, Flatau presented the full clinical picture of migraine and described the disease as an innate disposition to pathological metabolic processes in the nervous system and described its distinguished characters – ocular, epileptic, mental and facial. The book was based on observations of himself and about 500 cases from his own practice.

In the introduction to the monograph, he wrote,"Migraine, as such, is not an independent or autonomous disease; it is just one set of symptoms in the great chain of changed neurometabolism, whose crucial aspect are chemical changes and endocrine glands. Migraine attack is the expression of brain disorders; however, an exact mechanism which may be responsible is currently just a matter of conjecture and supposition. Today [1912] we cannot describe mechanisms that come to play and express them in well defined anatomical and physiological aspects. The forces that govern such mechanisms are also not known to us. We can only guess and make assumptions as to their operation. Nevertheless, great progress characterizing the development of neurology in the second half of the nineteenth century is visible in the field of research into migraine as well. As a result, one can describe some of the ideas on more reliable anatomical and physiological grounds."

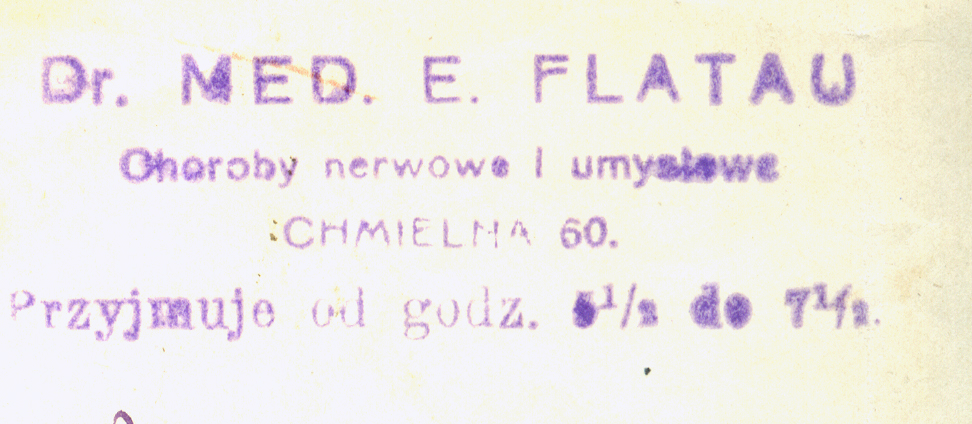
Dr. med. E. Flatau. Nervous and mental diseases. Chmielna 60 Street [Warsaw]. Hours 5 pm and 1/2 till 7 pm and 1/2. This is medical doctor seal from a medical prescription issued on 27 August 1920.

=== Psychiatry ===
In addition to neurology, Flatau was a psychiatrist. Irena Solska, famous Polish actress, describes in her memoirs that playing Maria, a mad wife in The Undivine Comedy of Zygmunt Krasinski around 1920, she visited the psychiatric hospital (ward) of Edward Flatau. Another of his patients was well-known Polish poet Jan Lechoń. In the story of Isaac Bashevis Singer, "The Power of Darkness", Flatau is even called to cure the demons. Excerpt from Singer's story reads: "The word soon spread through Krochmalna Street and the surrounding streets that a dybbuk had settled in Tzeitel's ear, and that it chanted Torah ... A Warsaw nerve specialist became interested in the case – Dr. Flatau, who was famous not only in Poland, but [also] in all Europe and maybe in America, too. And an article about the case appeared in a Yiddish newspaper. The author borrowed its title from Tolstoy's play The power of darkness."

=== Medical practice ===
In addition to his scientific work, he had a private practice in Warsaw. In 1904, he became head of the Department of Neurology at the Szpital Starozakonnych w Warszawie, which he led for 28 years. There, many of the Polish neurologists were making their first steps. His pupil Eufemiusz Herman recalls: "Traditionally on Mondays, patient cases were reviewed. At the bedside of each patient, Flatau discussed their cases; he listened to the voice of everyone, even the youngest doctor ... As a teacher and a boss, he was deeply attached to each and every one who worked with him. They could draw richly from his great experience and extensive knowledge. He was patient, forgiving, always cheerful, treating students as their beloved family. Thinking forehead, deep dark eyes with a keen, yet warm gaze, low voice with a wide range of modulation – these are the features which, apart from the deep knowledge and great experience, attracted and charmed anyone who was in the circle of his indefatigable activity."

In 1908, he lived on the Marszałkowska 150 Street in Warsaw on the first floor of the House of Fashion of Boguslaw Herse. He also lived for some time in the apartment on Chmielna Street 60. Other stories associated with Flatau and his Warsaw traces can be found in the articles of Jerzy Kasprzycki.

== Social activities ==
=== Beginning of neurology in Poland ===
By 1899, Flatau had established a name for himself both in Germany and abroad, and returned to Poland during that year. Flatau was closely associated with attempts to re-establish Polish science during and after Russian occupation. After his return, he formed a private microscopy laboratory at his apartments in Warsaw, and worked in Warsaw hospitals as a consultant. In 1911, he established a neurological laboratory in the Warsaw Psychologic Society, and he became in 1913 the first head of the Department of Neurobiology of the Warsaw Scientific Society (Warszawskie Towarzystwo Naukowe) and from 1911 to 1923, head of the Department of Neurobiology at the Nencki Institute of Experimental Biology. For many years, he shared his responsibilities as experimentator and neurologist between the laboratory and the hospital. He was influential in establishing Polish medical periodicals Neurologia Polska and Warszawskie Czasopismo Lekarskie.

Especially at the beginning of his career, he was involved in popular science activities in Poland. He published in popular medicine journals such as Zdrowie, Gazeta Lekarska, and Nowiny Lekarskie. Flatau's law, originally published in German, was reprinted in Polish in the journal Nowiny Lekarskie together with the basic introduction. His brain atlas and a book about migraine were translated into Polish, as well.

He was interested in history of Polish medicine. In 1899, he notes: "Quite important for the history of Polish medicine is the fact that Robert Remak, one of the greatest histologists and neuropathologists, was born in Poznań in 1815 and published his fundamental work in the Polish language. This historical information was communicated to me by his son – Professor Ernst Remak in Berlin. He was also kind enough to give me a copy of this epic work in the Polish language."

He was co-editor of the German journal Jahresbericht Leistungen und über die Fortschritte auf dem Gebiete der Neurologie und Psychiatrie. Since its inception in 1897 until 1900, and afterwards as a collaborator, he contributed to the journal and was summarizing Polish neurological and psychiatric literature.

According to the comments of Henryk Higier in 1932, "Flatau being convicted of the shameful behavior of the German occupying forces during the World War I stopped his friendly relations with Germany, to which scientist he felt deep affection, and moved entirely his scientific affinity towards medical sciences in France ...". Analysis of his publications in that period indicates that he indeed increased significantly, after the World War I, publications in French journals, but still on occasion published in German. In the same article, Higier writes "In social life, Flatau ... [had] a sense of responsibility for the state of Polish intellectual culture and the level and extent of Polish research ideas."

In the early 20th century, the world neurology was beginning to be organized in international structures. In 1929, Flatau wrote to Henry Riley - secretary of the organizing committee of the I International Congress of Neurology which was to be held in 1931 - "as a representative of the Polish Committee, I express astonishment and grief that none of the vice-presidents of the Congress nor any of the honorary members ... are from Poland. Polish neurologists were relentless in their efforts during all the years of political dependence and their work has intensified since gaining independence."

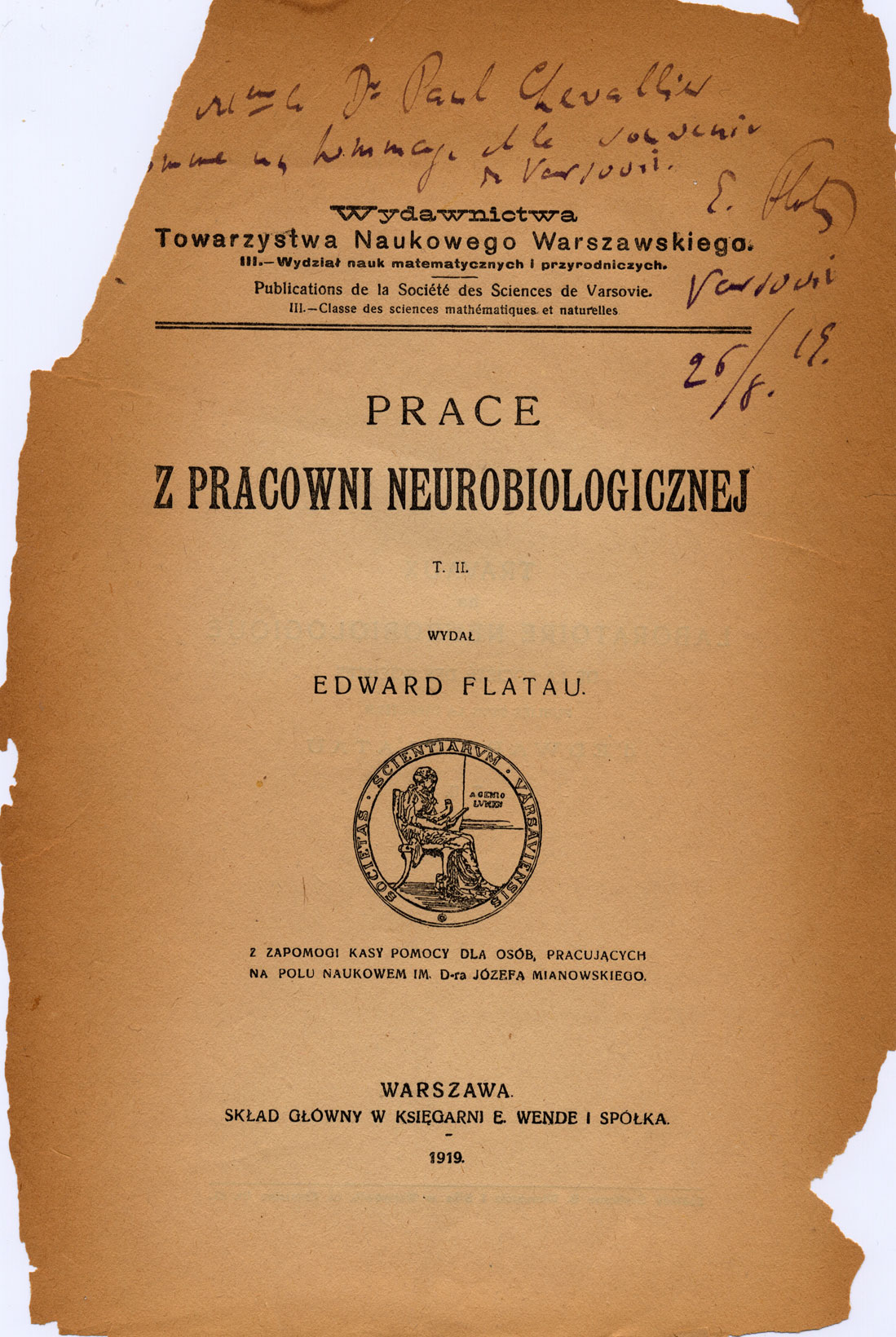
First page of collected publications of the Neurological Laboratory of the Warsaw Scientific Society published in 1912

=== Neurobiological Laboratory and Nencki Institute ===
Flatau has played an important role in the development of the Nencki Institute of Experimental Biology in Warsaw (it exists to this day), and he created the first experimental neurobiological laboratory in Poland, and was member and contributed to development of the Warsaw Scientific Society (he was a member since 19 January 1908). As Poland was under occupation in that time, this society played an important role in re-establishing Polish science in the years to come. The neurological laboratory at the Nencki Institute had rather humble origin. In the early 20th century, after settling in Warsaw, Flatau established in his private apartment, microscopy laboratory in the building where the fashion house of Herse was located on Marszałkowska 150 street. The anecdote about this laboratory is: "[A] carriage would take us to building on Marszalkowska Street, the same building where were mannequin ladies stood in shopping windows of House of Fashion of Boguslaw Herse (...) In this house lived, on the first floor, my uncle Edward Flatau, who – just like my father – was a neurologist and psychiatrist (...) There was a St. Bernard dog that had its idiosyncrasies. In the long, narrow room of the apartment stood, preserved in alcohol and covered, brains of animals and humans that uncle studied. At night, the St. Bernard used his paws to remove the cover and ate a brain, always just one. He was taking off the cover gently and quietly placed it on the table. Flatau would not detect it for several days because he did not work in the laboratory every day. Then he announced that St. Bernard would be thrown out (...). St. Bernard looked at my uncle with reproach and would leave the room in protest against these threats..."

Subsequently, this laboratory moved on Jerozolimska Avenue 85 under auspices of the Psychological Society. In October 1911, Flatau donated to the Warsaw Scientific Society his neurological laboratory, along with the entire inventory and allowance of 2,000 rubles. In that time (1911), the Warsaw Scientific Society received as a gift from Józef Potocki, a house on Śniadeckich 8, where the laboratory was located. This is the same building where in 1913, Maria Skłodowska-Curie funded a radiology laboratory and was its honorary director. For many years, Flatau was the director of the neurological laboratory and was assisted by Teofil Simchowicz. According to Herman "Every day at 9 am, Flatau showed up in the neurobiological laboratory on Śniadecki 8 Street. Here, he was performing experiments on animals, reviewed the histology specimens, [and] collaborated with his colleagues. At 11 am, he would go for coffee at a nearby Ostrowski cafe at the intersection of Koszykowa and Marszałkowska Streets, and after 15 minutes, he would go to the hospital on Czyste on Dworska 15 street." The laboratory conducted research in the fields of comparative anatomy, general and nervous system, physiology, pathological anatomy, experimental pathology, and experimental therapy of the nervous system. He collaborated with an assistant of Maria Skłodowska-Curie, Ludwik Wertenstein, on experimental oncology (use of radioactivity).

The Institute of Experimental Biology of Marcel Nencki was established in Warsaw at the initiative of students and colleagues of Marceli Nencki. At the end of 1918, Kazimierz Białaszewicz, along with Edward Flatau and Romuald Minkiewicz, head of just created Department of General Biology (Zakład Biologii Ogólnej) applied to the board of the Warsaw Scientific Society with an initiative to separate these three laboratories and create an organization under the name of "Institute of Experimental Biology. Marcel Nencki". Flatau headed the Laboratory of Neurobiology, between 1911 and 1923.

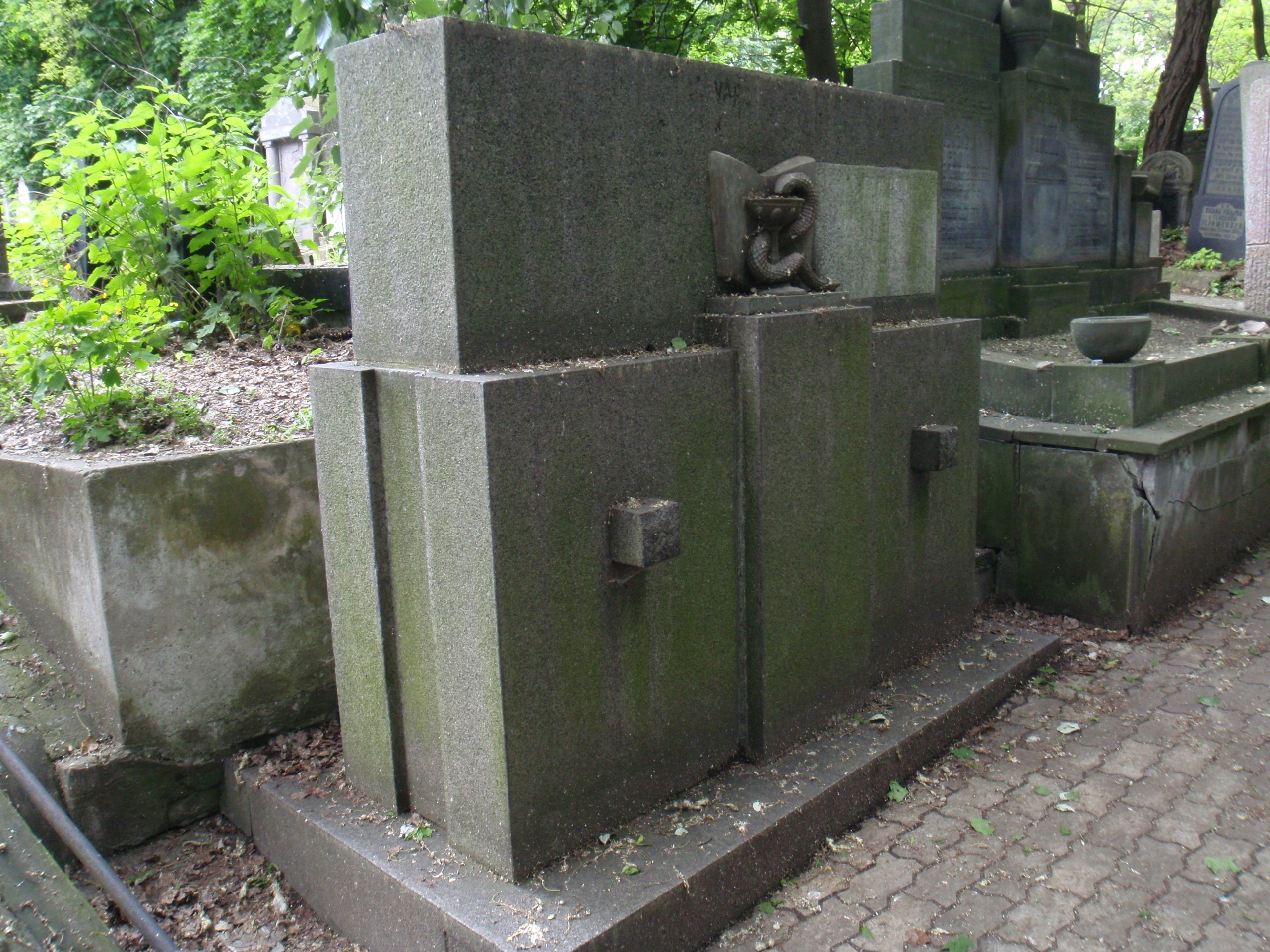
Grave of Edward Flatau in Warsaw

== Last months ==
In January 1932, he diagnosed himself with a brain tumor. He kept notes about his illness, but they were lost during the war. He died five months later, and he is buried at the Jewish Cemetery in Warsaw (section 10, row 2).

At his grave, Dr. A. Goldman said: "reticent in colloquial conversations, strong in resolving professional and academic difficulties, Edward Flatau died as a result of the suffering that he recognized himself and during the course of his illness he carefully and stoically made notes about its progress (...). His friend Samuel Goldflam mentioned: (...) I have to speak over the grave of my late friend ... He was a fanatic of work and he worked relentlessly, since January he knew perfectly well that he was afflicted with an incurable disease, but he did not confide it to anyone, he did not let anyone know." Several thousand people came to his funeral. His headstone was done by sculptor Mieczysław Lubelski. He died in 1932, the same year as two other notable Polish neurologists and friends, Samuel Goldflam and Joseph Jules François Félix Babinski (Polish-French neurologist).

== Bibliography ==
- Edward Flatau and Alfred Goldscheider: Normale und pathologische Anatomie der Nervenzellen: auf Grund der neueren Forschungen, Berlin, H. Kornfeld, 1898, 140 pages.
- Atlas of the human brain, and the course of the nerve-fibres, by Edward Flatau, with a preface by E. Mendel. Berlin, S. Karger, 1894. 25 pages.
- Handbuch der Anatomie und vergleichenden Anatomie des Centralnervensystems der Säugetiere. With Louis Jacobsohn (Berlin neurobiologist). Berlin, S. Karger, 1899.
- Handbuch der pathologischen Anatomie des Nervensystems. With L. Jacobsohn, Karl Anders Petrén (1868–1927) and Lazar Salomowitch Minor (1855–1942). Berlin, 1903–1904.
- Tumeurs de la moelle épinicre et de la colonne vertebrale, Paris, 1910, 175 pages.
- Migrena. La migraine. Warszawa, Nakladem Towarzystwa Naukowego Warszawskiego, 1912, vi, 313 pages. Series title: Wydawnictwa Towarzystwa Naukowego Warszawskiego. III.- Wydzial nauk matematycznych i przyrodniczych. In Polish.
- Die Migräne. Berlin, J. Springer, 1912. Series title: Monographien aus dem Gesamtgebiete der Neurologie und Psychiatrie, Hft. 2.
- Ernst Julius Remak and E. Flatau: Neuritis und Polyneuritis. 2 parts. Wien, A. Hölder, 1899–1900. In Carl Wilhelm Hermann Nothnagel (1841–1905), et al., publisher: Handbuch der speciellen Pathologie und Therapie. IX, Bd. 3, Abt. 3–4. (24 volumes, Vienna, 1894–1905). Flatau wrote the parts on anatomy and pathological anatomy.

== See also ==
- List of Poles
- Poles
