= Ernst Remak =

German neurologist (1849–1911)

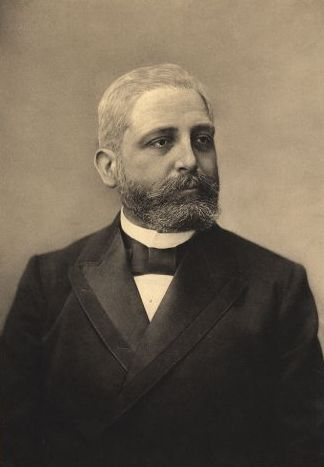
Ernst Julius Remak (1849–1911)

Ernst Julius Remak (26 May 1849, Berlin – 24 May 1911, Wiesbaden) was a German neurologist who was the son of famed neurologist Robert Remak (1815–1865) and the father of the mathematician Robert Remak (1888–1942).

He received his education at the Universities of Breslau, Berlin, Würzburg, Strasbourg and Heidelberg, and obtained the degree of M.D. in 1870. At Heidelberg, he was a student of neurologist Wilhelm Heinrich Erb (1840–1921). Afterwards he took part in the Franco-Prussian War of 1870–71. After serving as assistant in the department for nervous diseases at the Charité Hospital, Berlin from 1873 to 1875, he established himself as a neurologist in the German capital, where he became privat-docent in 1877, and professor in 1893.

With Edward Flatau (1868–1932), he published an important work on neuritis and polyneuritis that was selected by Carl Nothnagel (1841–1905) to be part of his Handbuch der speziellen Pathologie und Therapie.

His name is associated with the eponymous "Remak reflex", which is plantar flexion of the first three toes and sometimes the foot with extension of the knee, induced by stroking of the upper anterior surface of the thigh. This reflex takes place when the conducting paths in the spinal cord are interrupted.

== Publications ==
Remak has contributed more than 50 essays to the professional journals, and is the author of:

- "Grundriss der Elektrodiagnostik und Elektrotherapie für Praktische Aerzte", Vienna, 1895.
- "Neuritis und Polyneuritis," in Nothnagel's, "Handbuch der Speziellen Pathologic und Therapie", ib. 1900.

== Sources ==
- Jewish Encyclopedia authors: Isidore Singer & Frederick T. Haneman
