= Joanna Flatau =

Polish psychiatrist

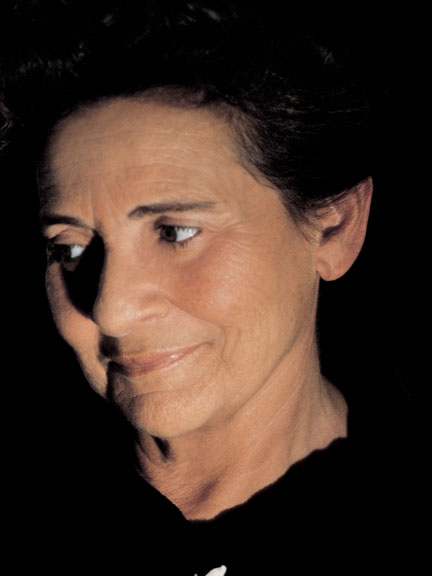
- Born: February 4, 1928; Warsaw, Poland
- Died: April 19, 1999 (aged 71); Warsaw, Poland

Joanna Antonina Flatau (4 February 1928 – 19 April 1999) was a Polish psychiatrist who developed innovative techniques for treating nervous disorder and established psychiatry services for Warsaw students.

== Life ==
Joanna was one of two daughters of the well-known Polish neurologist Edward Flatau. She described her early initiation into psychiatry: "Mr. Maurycy Bornsztajn was a psychoanalyst who worked, at the beginning of the war, in our Warsaw apartment. I lay near the door and eavesdropped on his conversations with patients. These were fascinating lessons in psychiatry."

During World War II she participated in the Warsaw Uprising and afterward was transported to work in the Wiener Holtzwerke factory. She wrote in her diary: "I remember a powerful, overwhelming nostalgia for Warsaw. In my dreams I walked down Marszalkowska Street toward Plac Zbawiciela (Savior Square), it would rain, and I would wake all in tears. This dream recurred often."

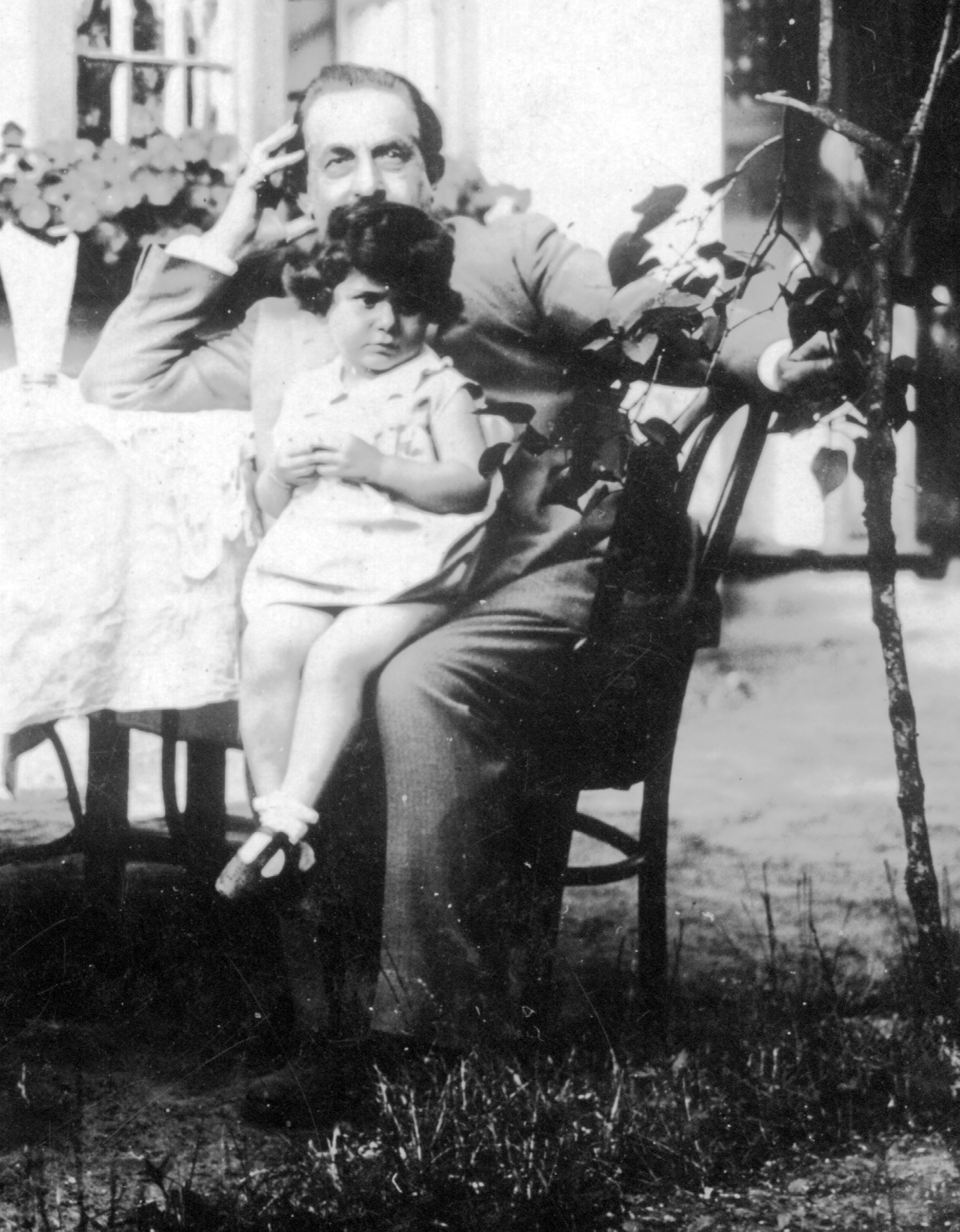
Joanna Flatau with her father, ca. 1932

From 1946 to 1952 she studied at Warsaw Medical School, graduating on 22 December 1952. Her friend, surgeon Maciek Grochowicz, has said: "Several years after the terrible destruction of the Second World War, I met Joanna and I knew about her sufferings, life-threatening situations, and work in the forced labor factory during the War, but wonderful, optimistic part of her character enabled her to become reborn, open to the future, and full of happiness and enjoyment of life. My recollections of our college times are not only related to exams and our successes. Everybody in that time who came into contact with Joanna remembered a beautiful, elegant, and compassionate person, even during difficult situations. Thanks to her, it was easier to overcome obstacles and develop a circle of close friends. She was an exceptional doctor. Her professional success was based on her ability to combine experience and intuition with a very personal relationship with each of her patients. She had the rare ability to encompass a deep understanding of the patient’s problems with friendship and a natural closeness."

After graduation, she worked in the Psychiatry Department at the Warsaw Medical University and subsequently established the Student Psychiatry Clinic for students and academics in Warsaw. She was the director of this clinic for 38 years, working there for the rest of her life.

For many years she organized summer camps for students with nervous disorders, the first one took place in Duszniki in 1970. The therapy was based on, just beginning at that time in Poland, individual and group psychotherapy; one of the psychotherapists was Andrzej Samson. She introduced techniques innovative for that time in Poland - choreotherapy which was organized by Zofia Aleszko, yoga which was organized by Tadeusz Pasek. She established a sanatorium for students with nervous disorders in Warsaw, origins of which she describes as: "In May of 1963, I went to Clinique Dupre in Sceaux, close to Paris. After a month of visiting, I came back obsessed with an idea of founding a sanatorium for students with psychiatric illnesses. In the late spring of 1969, the first 6 students snuck into Gornoslaska Street (previously a tuberculosis sanatorium). Later, there were 12, 22, and finally, it achieved the magic number of 44."

Her grave is in the Ewangelicko-Augsburski Cemetery in Warsaw.
