= Alison Flatau =

American aerospace engineer

Alison B. Flatau is an American aerospace engineer whose research involves smart materials and magnetostriction, changes in the physical shape of materials under magnetic fields, and in the application of nanowires built from these materials in controlling the flight of micro air vehicles. She is a professor and department chair of the Department of Aerospace Engineering in the A. James Clark School of Engineering at the University of Maryland, College Park.

== Education and career ==
Flatau entered the University of Connecticut intending to study environmental engineering, but completed her degree in chemical engineering. Next, she spent four years as a research engineer at the National Small Wind Systems Test Site in Colorado, a predecessor organization to the National Renewable Energy Laboratory. Returning to graduate study, Flatau studied mechanical engineering at the University of Utah, where she earned a master's degree and Ph.D.

From 1990 to 1998, she was a faculty member in the Iowa State University Aerospace Engineering and Engineering Mechanics Department, and from 1998 to 2002 she worked as a program director for the National Science Foundation, in the Dynamical Systems Modeling Sensing and Control Program.

Since 2002, she has been a professor in the Department of Aerospace Engineering in the A. James Clark School of Engineering at the University of Maryland, College Park. She was the university's associate dean of research from 2009 to 2015. She became chair of Aerospace Engineering in 2022.

== Recognition ==
Flatau was named as an ASME Fellow in 2006, and as a Fellow of the American Institute of Aeronautics and Astronautics in 2015. She was a Distinguished Lecturer of the IEEE Magnetics Society in 2018.

She was the recipient of the 2010 Aerospace Engineering Educator of the Year Award of Women in Aerospace, of the 2010 SPIE Smart Structures and Materials Lifetime Achievement Award, and of the 2013 Adaptive Structures and Materials Systems Prize of the ASME.
