= Alfred Stengel =

American surgeon

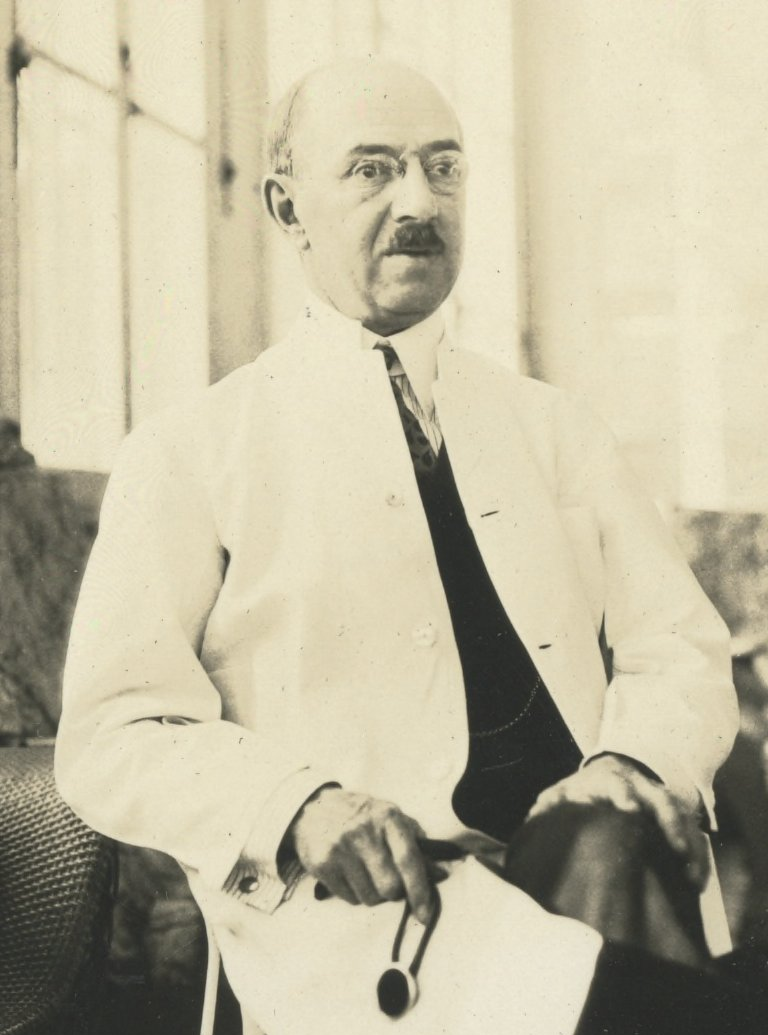
- Born: 1868; Lancaster County, Pennsylvania
- Died: 1939 (aged 70–71)
- Citizenship: American
- Occupation: physician

Professor Alfred Stengel (1868–1939) was an American surgeon, born in Lancaster County, Pennsylvania. He was president of the American College of Physicians, a clinical professor of medicine at the Women's Medical College of Pennsylvania, and a member of the American Philosophical Society.

== Biography ==
Stengel was born in Pittsburgh, the son of Gottfried Stengel, in 1868. In 1889, whilst studying, he and a group of students commissioned Thomas Eakins to paint The Agnew Clinic. Stengel can be found in the center of the portrait.
