= Louis Jacobsohn-Lask =

German neurologist and neuroanatomist (1863–1941)

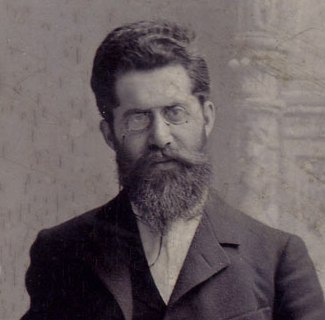
Louis Jacobsohn-Lask (1863-1941)

Louis Jacobsohn-Lask (born Louis Jacobsohn; 2 March 1863, in Bromberg – 17 May 1941, in Sevastopol) was a German neurologist and neuroanatomist.

He studied medicine at the University of Berlin under Heinrich Wilhelm Waldeyer, Rudolf Virchow, Emil du Bois-Reymond, Ernst Viktor von Leyden and Robert Koch. In 1899 Jacobsohn and Edward Flatau wrote Handbuch der Anatomie und vergleichenden Anatomie des Centralnervensystems der Säugetiere, which included one of the first attempts to classify sulci and gyri of human brain cortex. In 1904 he wrote, together with Flatau and Lazar Minor, another monograph, Handbuch der pathologischen Anatomie der Nervensystems. He described a finger flexion reflex called the Bekhterev-Jacobsohn reflex or Jacobsohn reflex. In 1909 he first described the pedunculopontine nucleus.

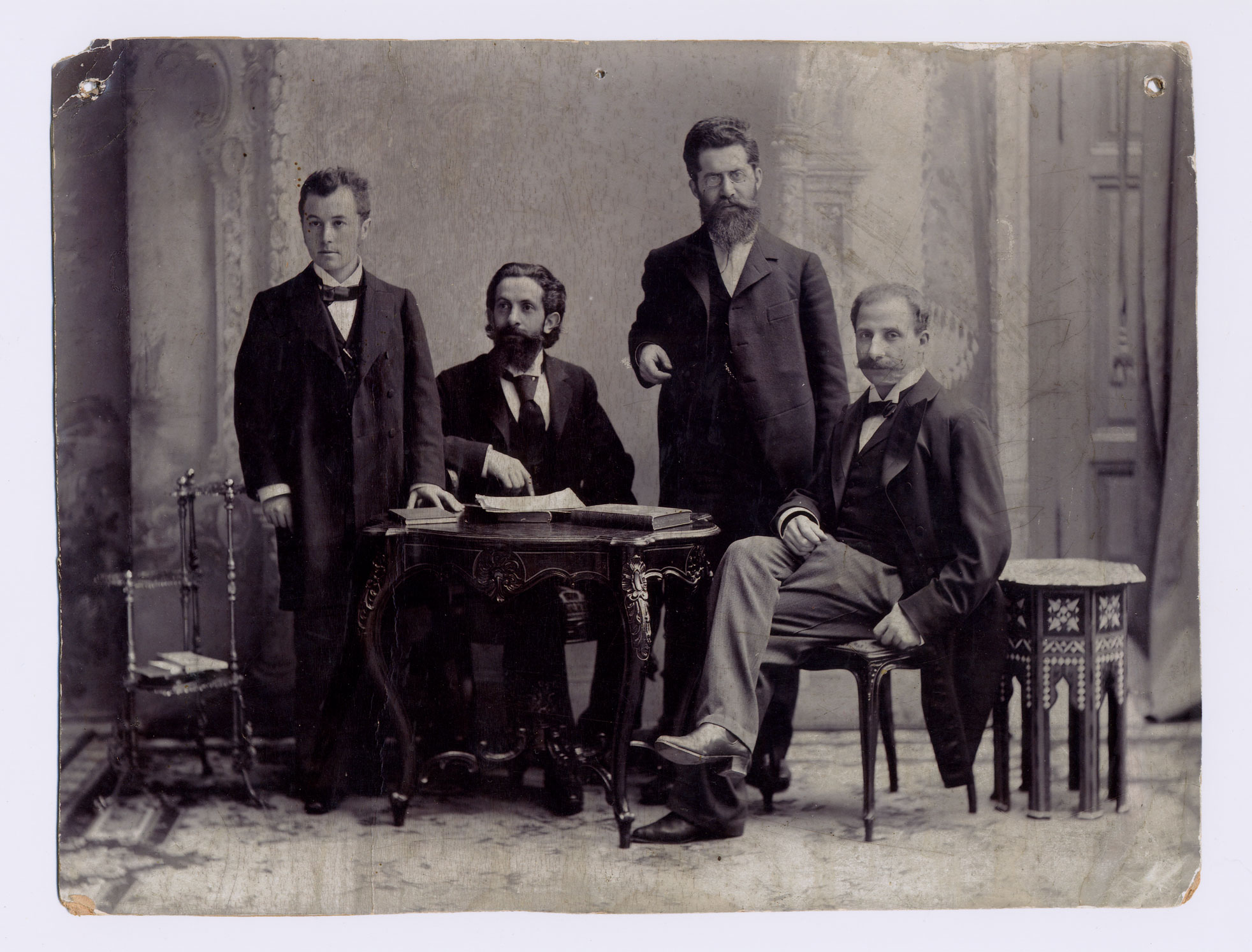
From left to right (standing) Dr S. Kalischer, Dr Edward Flatau, Dr L. Jacobsohn-Lask, Dr B. Pollack. Berlin, ca 1900.

In 1936 he emigrated to the Soviet Union with his wife, Berta Jacobsohn-Lask, a communist of Jewish provenance, whom he had married in 1901. He was encouraged to continue his scientific work. They settled in Sevastopol, where Louis Jacobsohn-Lask died in 1941.

== Sources ==
- Ulrike Eisenberg. Vom "Nervenplexus" zur "Seelenkraft": Werk und Schicksal des Berliner Neurologen Louis Jacobsohn-Lask (1863–1940). (Berliner Beiträge zur Wissenschaftsgeschichte, ed. by Wolfgang Höppner, vol. 10). Frankfurt am Main, Berlin, Bern, Bruxelles, New York, Oxford, Wien. Frankfurt a. M.: Peter Lang – Europäischer Verlag der Wissenschaften, 2005. 513 pp., 11 fig.
- Home Away from Home: The Berlin Neuroanatomis Louis Jacobsohn-Lask in Russia. W: Ulrike Eisenberg: Doing medicine together: Germany and Russia between the wars. Susan Snell Solomon (red.). Toronto: University of Toronto Press, 2006, s. 407. ISBN 0-8020-9171-7.
