= Flatow =

Flatow is a surname. Notable people with the surname include:

- Alfred Flatow (1869–1942), German gymnast
- Alisa Flatow (1974–1995), American student and terrorism victim
- Curth Flatow (1920–2011), German dramatist and screenwriter
- Evan Flatow (born 1956), American orthopaedic surgeon
- Fred Flatow (born 1937), Australian-German chess master
- Gustav Flatow (1875–1945), German gymnast
- Ira Flatow (born 1949), radio and television journalist, NPR
- Max Flatow (1915–2003), American architect
- Stephen Flatow (born 1948) American lawyer and father of terrorism victim Alisa Flatow
