= Ernest Masoin =

Belgian physician and physiologist

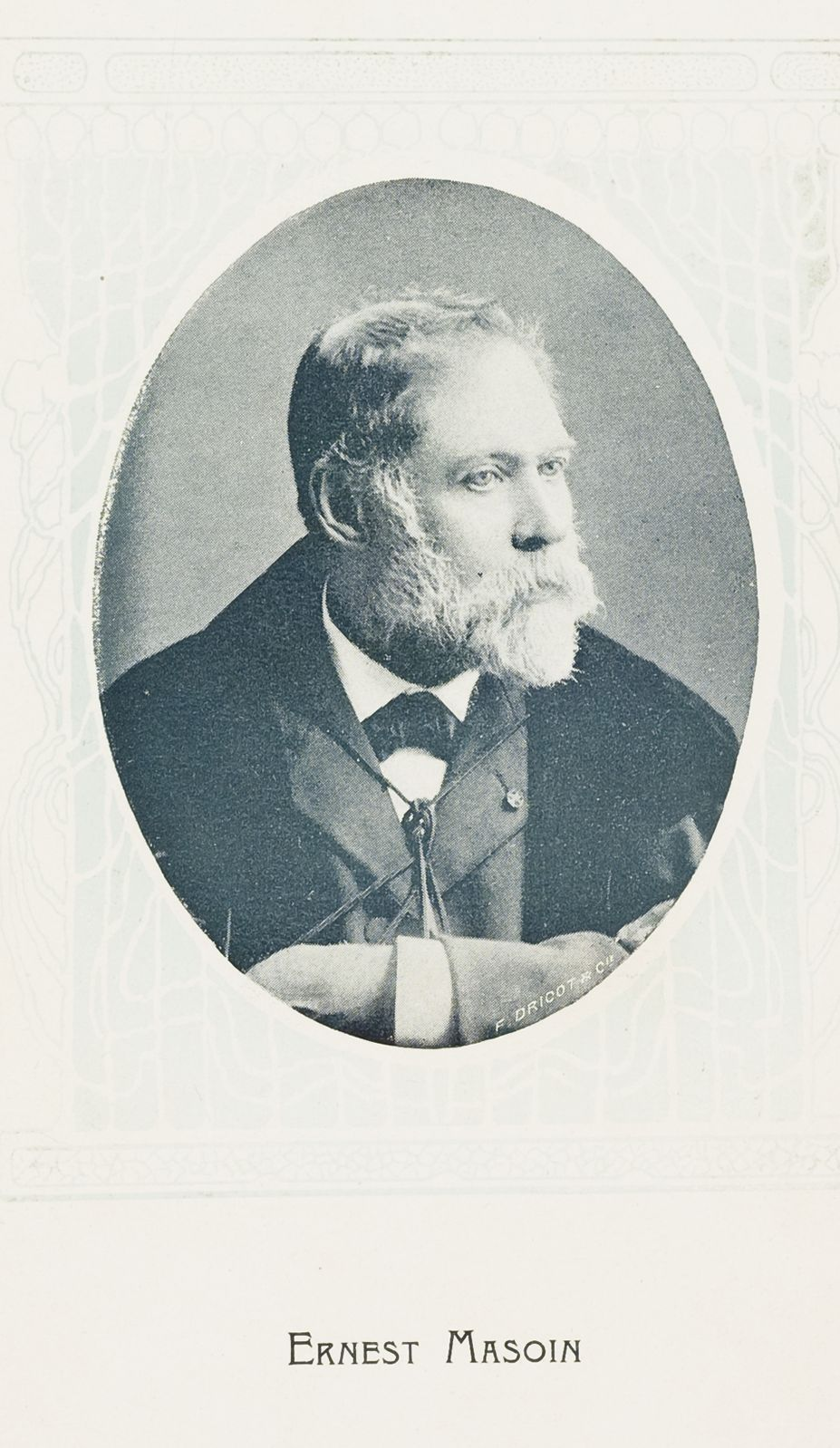
Ernest Masoin

Ernest Nicolas Masoin (23 July 1844, Virton – 21 April 1915, Ixelles) was a Belgian physician and physiologist.

He studied medicine at the Catholic University of Louvain, obtaining his doctorate in 1867. He then furthered his education in Paris, Bonn and Heidelberg, returning to Louvain in 1868 as successor to Louis-Antoine Van Biervliet (1802–1868) as chair of physiology, a position he would hold without interruption up until 1914. During this time period, he was also a doctor at the Frères Alexiens asylum (from 1891), and in 1896, in addition to physiology, he began teaching classes in psychiatry at the university.

He was a member of the Société médico-psychologique de Paris, the Société de Thérapeutique générale de France and the Société de Médecine mentale de Belgique. From 1890 to 1915, he was secrétaire perpétuel of the Académie royale de Médecine de Belgique. In 1903 he became part of the international commission to make presentations for the Nobel Prize in Medicine. In 1915, the main avenue in front of the Hôpital Brugmann in the municipality of Jette was named in his honour.

== Selected works ==
- Etude physiologique sur les forces vitales, 1871.
- Coup d'oeil sur l'assistance des épileptiques en Belgique et dans les pays étrangers, 1889.
- Chateaubriand, sa vie et son caractère: essai médical et littéraire, 1908.
- L' Hérédité, 1914.
