= Robert Remak (mathematician) =

German mathematician (1888–1942)

- Portrait of Remak
- Born: Robert Erich Remak; 14 February 1888; Berlin, German Empire
- Died: 13 November 1942 (aged 54); Auschwitz-Birkenau, German-occupied Poland
- Known for: Remak decomposition
- Scientific career
- Fields: Mathematics
- Doctoral advisor: Ferdinand Georg Frobenius

Robert Erich Remak (14 February 1888 – 13 November 1942) was a German mathematician. He is chiefly remembered for his work in group theory (Remak decomposition). His other interests included algebraic number theory, mathematical economics and geometry of numbers. Robert Remak was the son of the neurologist Ernst Julius Remak and the grandson of the embryologist Robert Remak. He was murdered in the Holocaust.

== Biography ==
Robert Remak was born in Berlin. He studied at Humboldt University of Berlin under Ferdinand Georg Frobenius and received his doctorate in 1911. His dissertation, Über die Zerlegung der endlichen Gruppen in indirekte unzerlegbare Faktoren ("On the decomposition of a finite group into indirect indecomposable factors") established that any two decompositions of a finite group into a direct product are related by a central automorphism. A weaker form of this statement, uniqueness, was first proved by Joseph Wedderburn in 1909. Later the theorem was generalized by Wolfgang Krull and Otto Schmidt to some classes of infinite groups and became known as the Krull–Schmidt theorem or the Krull–Remak–Schmidt theorem.

Although the dissertation was first submitted in 1911, it was rejected several times and Remak did not obtain his Habilitation until 1929. In the meantime, he wrote several papers on the geometry of numbers. Between 1929 and 1933 Remak lectured as a Privatdozent at Humboldt University. In the 1929 essay Kann die Volkwirtschaftslehre eine exakte Wissenschaft werden? ("Can economics become an exact science?"), Remak analyzed price formation in socialist and capitalist economies. He also anticipated the role played by digital computers in numerical solution of systems of linear equations. Remak's analysis may have influenced John von Neumann, who was a fellow lecturer in Berlin, but most of it has not been translated into English and it remains little known and appreciated in the English-speaking world. In 1932 Remak published a paper giving a lower bound for the regulator of an algebraic number field in terms of the numbers r_{1} and r_{2} of real embeddings and pairs of complex embeddings. He went on to investigate relations between the regulator and the discriminant of an algebraic number field, isolating an important class of CM-fields ("fields with unit defect"). His last two papers on the subject appeared in Compositio Mathematica in 1952 and 1954, more than ten years after his death.

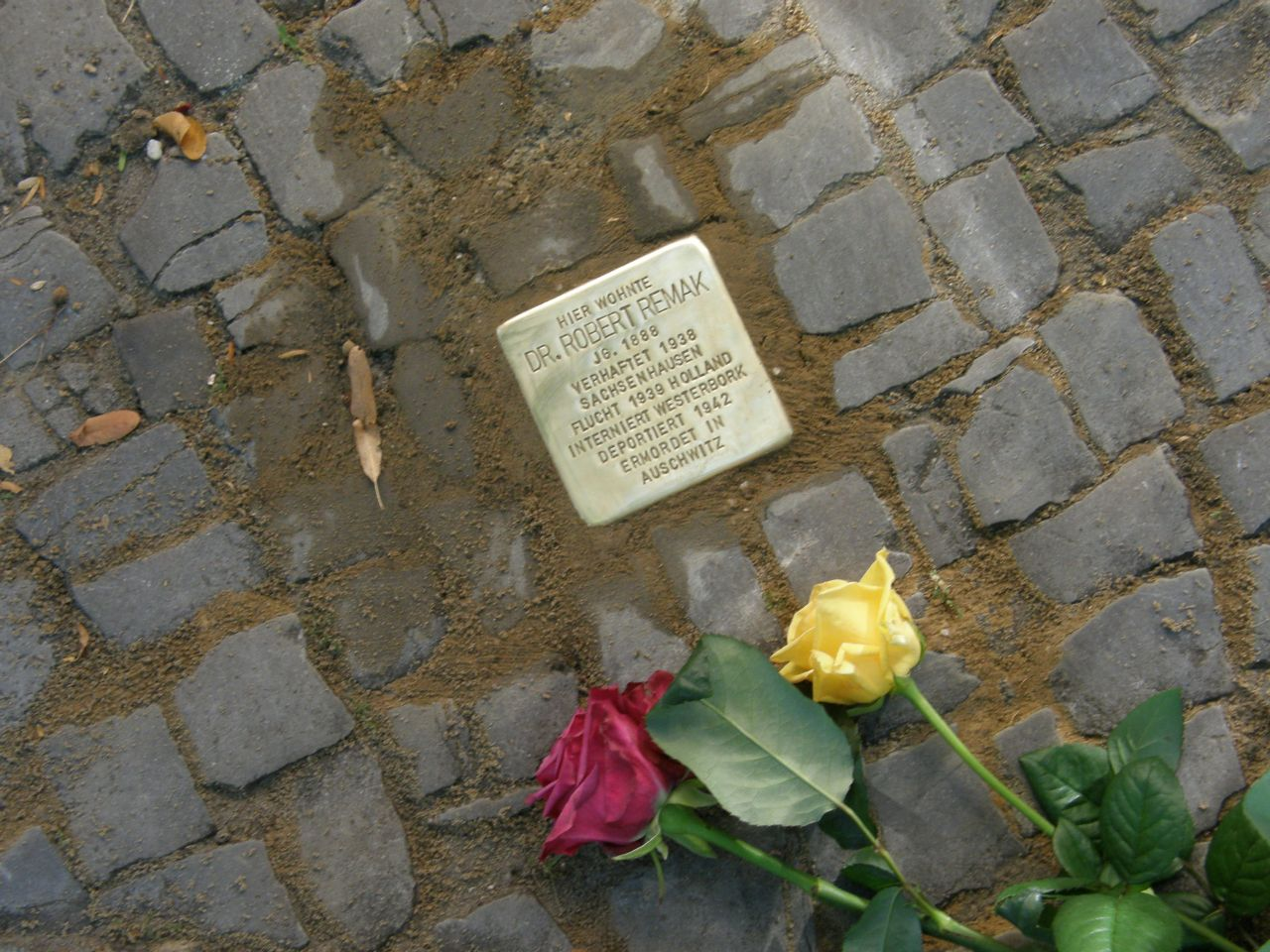
Stolperstein for Remak in Berlin-Lichterfelde

After the Nazis seized power in 1933 and the Civil Service Law was passed a few months later, Remak, who was of Jewish ancestry, lost his right to teach in September 1933. He was arrested on Kristallnacht, 9 November 1938, and was interned at Sachsenhausen concentration camp for several weeks. After an unsuccessful campaign by his wife to secure a permission for him to emigrate to the United States, he was released and permitted to leave for Amsterdam. In 1942, however, he was arrested by the German occupational authorities in the Netherlands and deported to Auschwitz, where he was murdered.

== Bibliography ==
- Harald Hagemann: Robert Remak. In: Neue Deutsche Biographie. Band 21. Duncker & Humblot, Berlin 2003, ISBN 3-428-11202-4, p. 410ff.
- Heinz D.Kurz and Neri Salvadori, von Neumann's 'growth model' and the classical tradition. In Understanding "classical" economics: studies in long-period theory, Routledge studies in the history of economics, 2003. ISBN 978-0-415-15871-8
- Uta C. Merzbach, Robert Remak and the estimation of units and regulators. Amphora, 481–522, Birkhäuser, Basel, 1992 MR 1192337
- Reinhard Siegmund-Schultze: Dokumente zur Geschichte der Mathematik. Quellen und Studien zur Emigration einer Wissenschaft. Band 10: Mathematiker auf der Flucht vor Hitler. Vieweg, Wiesbaden 1998, ISBN 3-528-06993-7
- David C. Clary The Lost Scientists of World War II, World Scientific Publishing, 2024, ISBN 978-1-80061-491-8
