= Robert Remak =

Polish embryologist and neurologist (1815–1865)

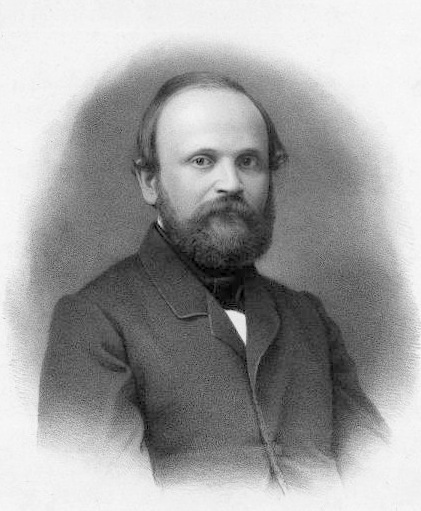
- Remak c. 1850-1855
- Born: 12 July 1815; Posen, Prussia
- Died: 29 August 1865 (aged 50); Bad Kissingen, Bavaria
- Education: University of Berlin
- Known for: Ectoderm, mesoderm and endoderm
- Scientific career
- Fields: Embryology; Physiology; Neurology
- Academic advisors: Johannes Peter Müller

Robert Remak (26 July 1815 – 29 August 1865) was an embryologist, physiologist and neurologist, born in Posen, Prussia, who discovered that the origin of cells was by the division of pre-existing cells. as well as several other key discoveries.

According to historian Paul Weindling, Rudolf Virchow, one of the founders of modern cell theory, plagiarized Remak's notion that all cells come from pre-existing cells. Remak had concluded this after observing red blood cells from chicken embryos in various stages of division. He then confirmed that the phenomenon existed in the cell of every frog's egg immediately after fertilization, proving that this was a universal phenomenon and finally explaining the reason for the results of tests by Louis Pasteur which had previously proved that there exists no spontaneous generation of life.

Remak obtained his medical degree from Friedrich Wilhelm University in Berlin (now Humboldt University of Berlin) in 1838 specializing in neurology. He is best known for reducing Karl Ernst von Baer's four germ layers to three: the ectoderm, mesoderm, and endoderm. He also discovered unmyelinating Schwann cells that surround peripheral nerve fibres, now named Remak cells, and the nerve cells in the heart sometimes called Remak's ganglia. He studied under Johannes Müller at the University of Berlin.

Despite his accomplishments, because he was a Jew, he was repeatedly denied full professor status, and finally late in life was appointed assistant professor, being the first Jew to teach in that institute. Even then he was never fully recognized for his discoveries.

His son Ernst Julius Remak was also a neurologist and his grandson was the mathematician Robert Remak who died in Auschwitz in 1942.
