= Visionary Heads =

1818 drawings by William Blake

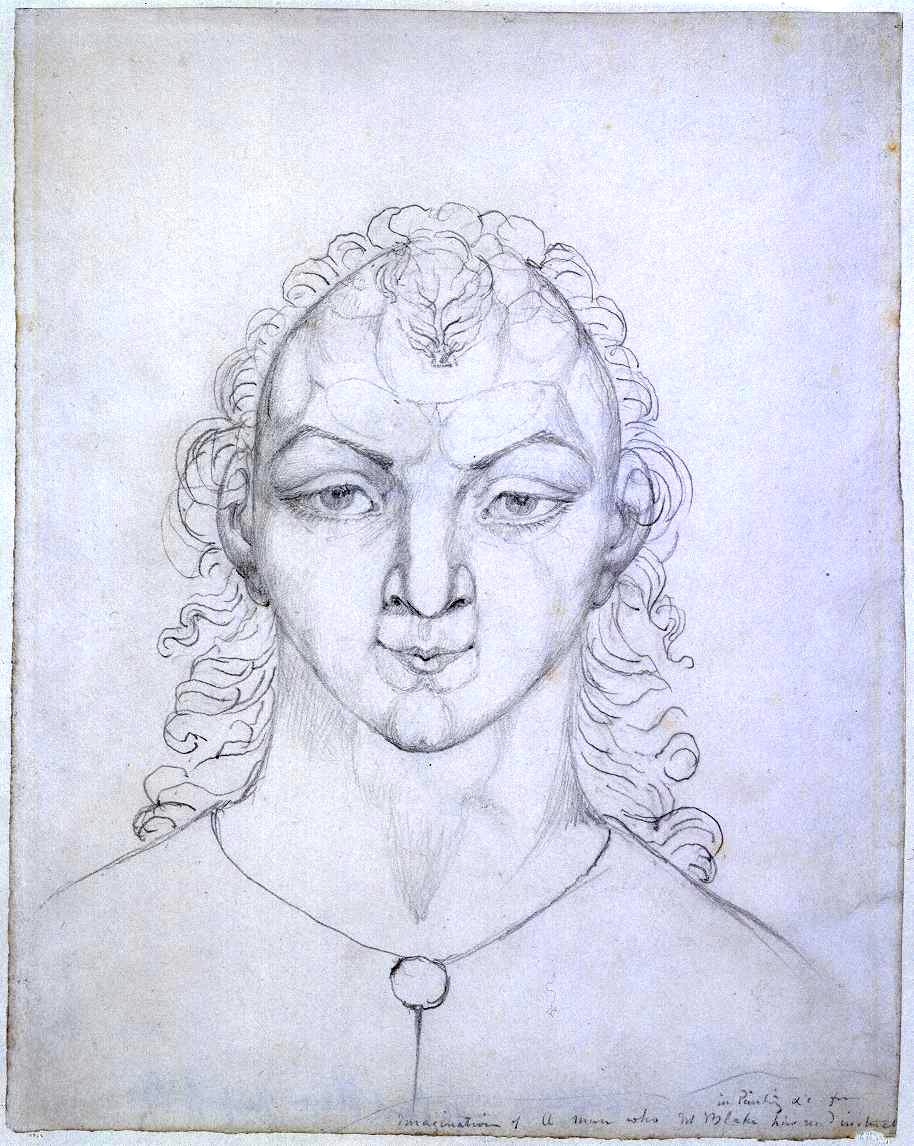
Imagination of A man who Mr Blake has rec[eive]d instruct[ion] in Painting &c from (The Visionary Selfportrait of William Blake)

The Visionary Heads is a series of black chalk and pencil drawings produced by William Blake after 1818 by request of John Varley, the watercolour artist and astrologer. The subjects of the sketches, many of whom are famous historical and mythical characters, appeared to Blake in visions during late night meetings with Varley, as if sitting for portraits. The drawings are contained in three sketchbooks and there are a number of loose leaves indicating the existence of a fourth sketchbook. Like most of Blake's other works, they have been subject to academic scrutiny and study.

Among the Visionary Heads drawn by Blake are David, Solomon, Uriah and Bathsheba, Nebuchadnezzar, Saul, Lot, Job, Socrates, his wife Xantippe, Julius Caesar, Christ, Muhammad, Merlin, Boadicea, Charlemagne, Ossian, Robin Hood, Caractacus, King Edward I, his Queen Eleanor, Edward the Black Prince, King Edward III, William Wallace, Wat Tyler, Roger Bacon, John Milton, Voltaire, as well as Devil, Satan, "Cancer", The Man Who Built the Pyramids, The Portrait of a Man who instructed Mr Blake in Painting &c in his Dreams, etc. The most famous of that series is Blake's painting of The Ghost of a Flea, made after the Visionary Head of The Ghost of a Flea.

== Background and context ==
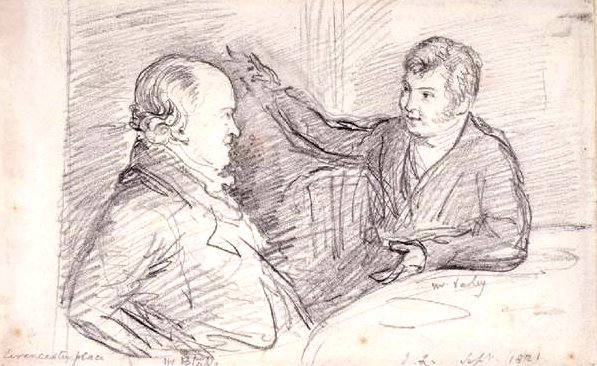
William Blake in Conversation with the astrologer John Varley, right, by John Linnell, 1818

William Blake said he had seen visions from his young age throughout his life, and in these visions he was visited by many spirits of people from the remote past as well as by his deceased friends from whom he received his inspiration for his poetry and painting. He also believed he was personally instructed and encouraged by archangels to create his artistic works, which he said were actively read and enjoyed by the same archangels. In 1800 he wrote: “I know that our deceased friends are more really with us than when they were apparent to our mortal part. Thirteen years ago I lost a brother, and with his spirit I converse daily and hourly in the spirit, and see him in my remembrance, in the region of my imagination. I hear his advice, and even now write from his dictate.”

In September 1818 the successful young painter John Linnell, one of the best friends and kindest patrons of Blake, introduced to Blake his former teacher John Varley. Varley was fascinated by Blake's accounts of his visions, thinking that they came from the spirit world of astrology. He persuaded Blake to draw the images of these visions in his presence to illustrate his Treatise on Zodiacal Physiognomy, published in 1828, after the death of Blake.

In 1819–20, Blake and Varley would often meet at Varley's house, and from about 9.00 pm until 5.00 am, play a game in which Varley would suggest Blake attempt to summon the spirit of some historical or mythological person. On the appearance of the spirit, Blake would then attempt to sketch its likeness. These drawings of which many remain, are the "spiritual images" of many very well known people of the past, whom Blake said he saw in visions that he experienced during these sessions.

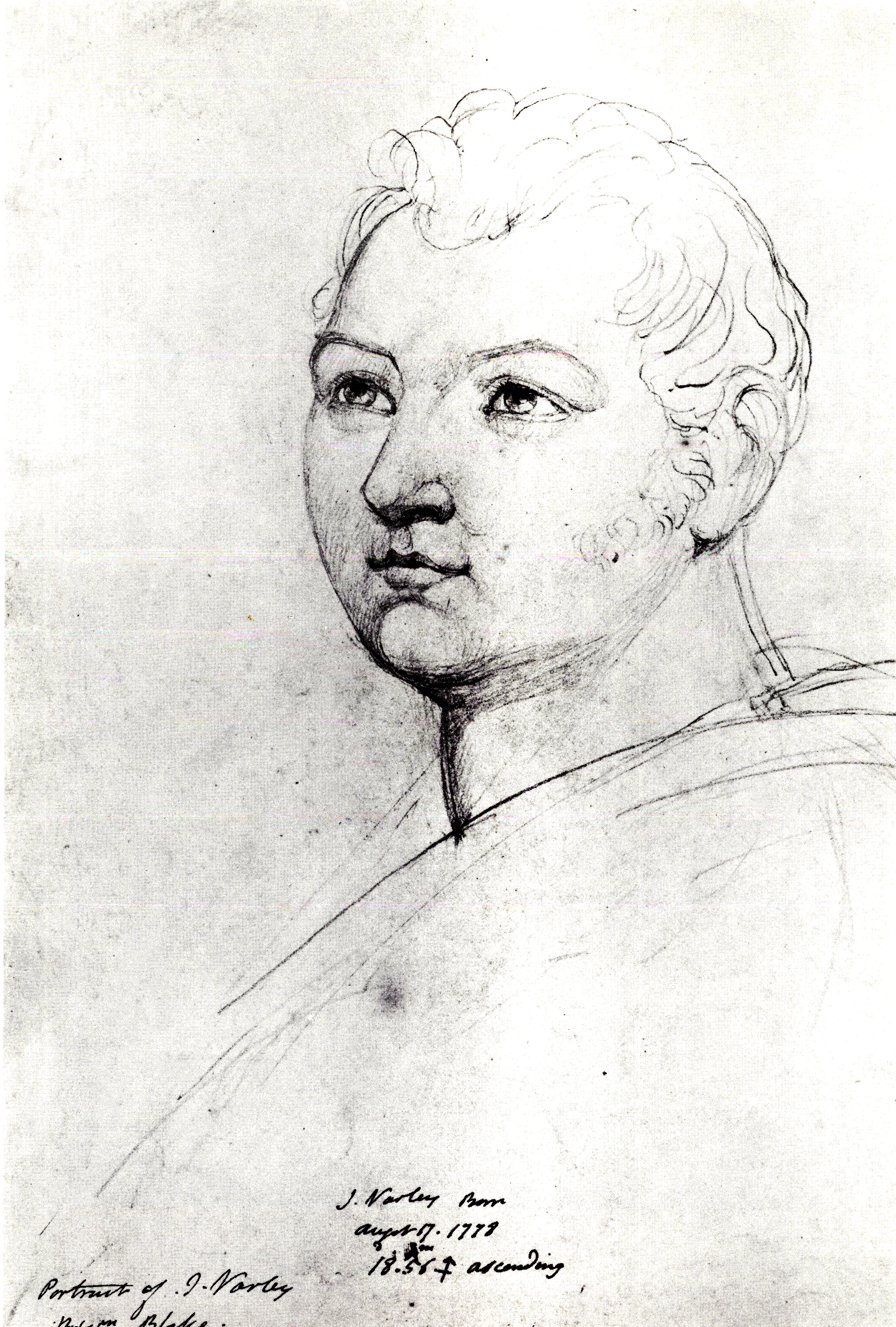
Portrait of John Varley by William Blake, c. 1818; 280x192mm, London National Portrait Gallery

Blake's biographer Alexander Gilchrist describes the meetings in the following manner:

Varley would say, "Draw me Moses," or David; or would call for a likeness of Julius Caesar, or Cassibellaunus, or Edward the Third, or some other great historical personage. Blake would answer, "There he is!" and paper and pencil being at hand, he would begin drawing, with the utmost alacrity and composure, looking up from time to time as though he had a real sitter before him; ingenuous Varley, meanwhile, straining wistful eyes into vacancy and seeing nothing, though he tried hard, and at first expected his faith and patience to be rewarded by a genuine apparition. A 'vision' had a very different signification with Blake to that it had in literal Varley's mind. Sometimes Blake had to wait for the Vision's appearance; sometimes it would not come at call. At others, in the midst of his portrait, he would suddenly leave off, and, in his ordinary quiet tones and with the same matter-of-fact air another might say "It rains," would remark, "I can't go on,—it is gone! I must wait till it returns;" or, "It has moved. The mouth is gone;" or, "he frowns; he is displeased with my portrait of him:" which seemed as if the Vision were looking over the artist's shoulder as well as sitting vis-à-vis for his likeness. The devil himself would politely sit in a chair to Blake, and innocently disappear; which obliging conduct one would hardly have anticipated from the spirit of evil, with his well-known character for love of wanton mischief.

Sometimes these sessions were in the nature of public events, as Bentley noted: "These midnight seances attracted the attention of many who otherwise would have ignored Blake, and a surprising number of lurid accounts were published about them – accounts which may, however, be substantially true. At least they are fairly consistent both with each other and with the inscriptions on the Visionary Heads themselves."

John Varley left his account of these sessions that took place almost nightly, recording some dates and circumstances of the evenings. He made a lot of detailed inscriptions below or on the back of Blake's drawings that help to classify them. He also created two lists known as “Varley's lists of Visionary Heads” (A & B) where he specified about 90 titles (some of them repeated) of “Portraits Drawn by W. Blake from Visions which appeared to him & Remained while he completed them…” John Linnell, who also was involved in these events and copied many of Blake's Visionary Heads to engrave them later for Varley's Treatise, wrote his own account and views on this subject in his “Journal” and “Autobiography” (fully cited by Gerald Eades Bentley Jr. in his Blake Records, see in the Bibliography below). In the opinion of the Blake scholar Sir Geoffrey Keynes:

Varley took this curious pastime a great deal more seriously than did Blake. To the latter it was a satisfaction to employ his faculty of vivid memory and imagination in the production of interesting characterizations of a variety of people... Blake sometimes drew them with such conviction that Varley seems to have regarded them as actual portraits.

Another Blake scholar, Kathleen Raine, expressed her opinion thus:

At last, in Varley, Blake had a friend who did not consider his visions ‘mad’. Varley was an astrologer, and apparently a highly professional one. Skeptical Gilchrist admits that his predictions were astonishingly accurate. He was evidently also a student of other esoteric subjects, and it was under his in his encouragement and in his company that Blake was encouraged to draw (in a light-hearted spirit, as it seems) those strange ‘spirit heads’. One is again reminded of Swedenborg, who conversed with spirits of departed almost as an everyday matter. These drawings – less imaginatively inspired, be it said, than Blake's more serious work – have a more-than-lifelike quality which bears witness, at least, to astonishing power of visual fantasy.

== Description ==
Varley provided Blake with a number of sketchbooks of different sizes for the purpose of making the drawings, the so-called "Blake–Varley Sketchbooks" (BVS). Collectively, scholars have identified three sketchbooks in which the drawings were contained. Two have been recovered by collectors, and the third has yet to be discovered, though clear records from the period and individual pages attest to the sketchbook. Other unbound sketches have been identified as well, some of them removed from one of the sketchbooks, while others may have been loose since Blake's production of them.

In addition, there are many Loose Visionary Heads made of separate sheets of paper. Some of them survived only in copies made by John Linnell. Though many other pictures were documented by Varley and Linnell, they have not been discovered and possibly are lost forever. Among these lost are the visionary heads of Alfred the Great, Cleopatra, St. Dunstan, Edward IV; Eleanor (Queen of Edward I), Guy Fawkes, Henry I of England, Henry II of England, Hezekiah, Macbeth, Lady Macbeth, Founder of the Pyramids, Richard III, David Rizzio, Richard Duke of Normandy, Robert, Duke of Normandy, King Rufus, Semiramis, William Shakespeare and Wild Thyme.

The "Blake–Varley Sketchbooks":

- The Small Blake–Varley Sketchbook (discovered in 1967)
- The Large Blake–Varley Sketchbook (discovered in 1989)
- The Folio Blake–Varley Sketchbook (not yet discovered)

== The Small Blake–Varley Sketchbook ==
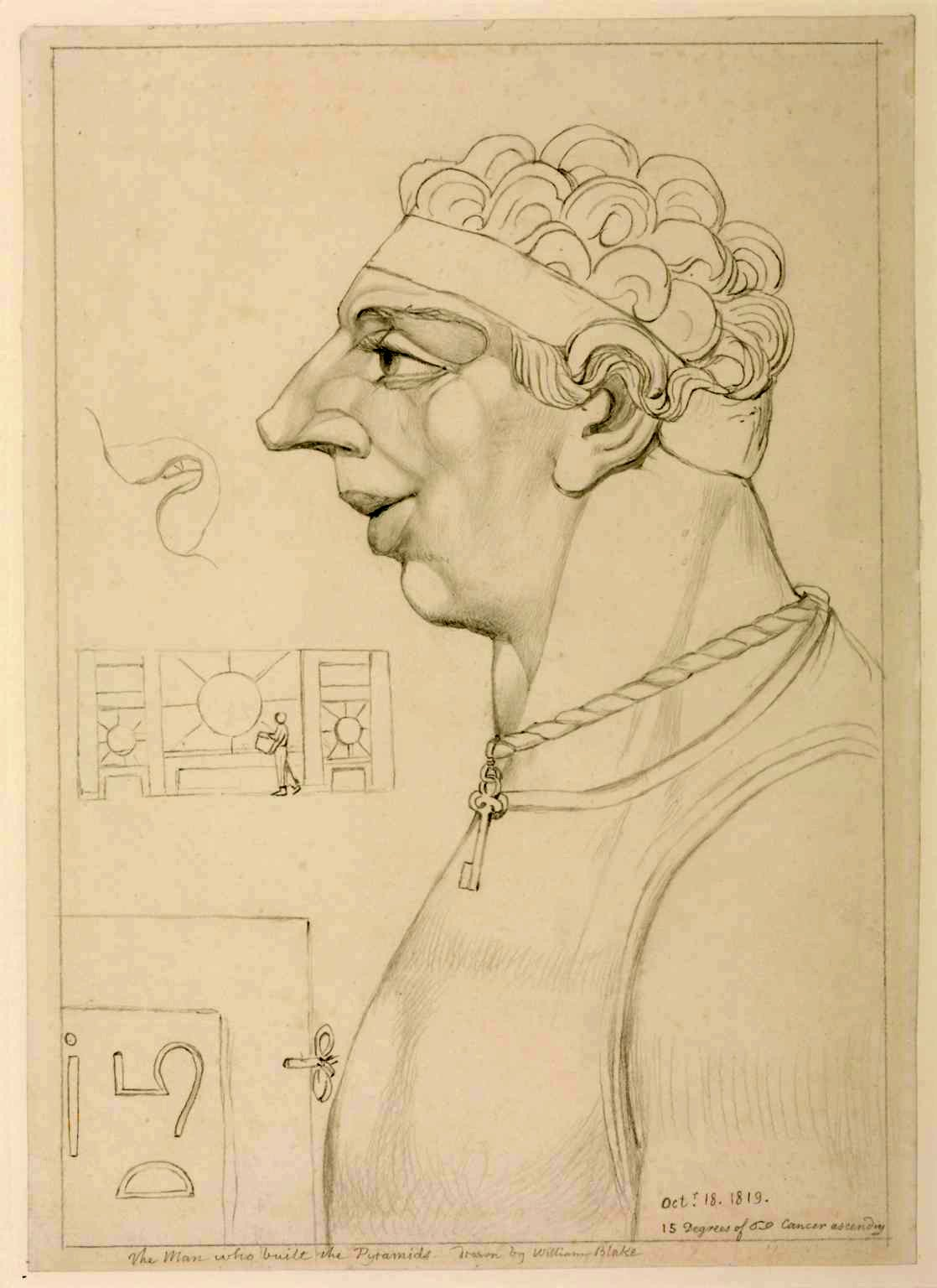
p. 102. The Man who Built the Pyramids (Butlin #752)

The sketchbook (c. 1819, Butlin #692, now broken up) that was lost to sight for almost a century was acquired in 1967 by Mr D. E. Clayton-Smith and then described and reproduced in 1969 by Martin Butlin (see Bibliography). This is an album 155 × 105 mm with the watermark 1806 that contains at least 36 pictures attributed to Blake, including:

- Empress Maud
- Caractacus (Butlin #719)
- Falconberg
- Prince Arthur
- Harold II killed at the Battle of Hastings
- Herod
- Corinna? (in profile)
- Antinous?
- John, King of England
- Merlin
- Milton's first wife
- The Devil and a man in armour
- Ghost of a Flea
- The Man Who Built Pyramids (#752)
- Voltaire in profile
- Edward VI? with a spiky collar
- Lais of Corinth the Courtesian
- Richard Coeur de Lion
- Cancer (#751)

plus a few unidentified figures.

Image	Title	Info	Description
	Visionary Head of Caractacus	c. 1819; 195 × 150 mm (Sir Geoffrey Keynes Collection). [Small BVS, p. 36; Butlin #719, Varley (lists) A1, B20]	An impressive drawing of the heroic leader and King of the Britons (of the Catuvellauni tribe, born c. 10 AD, died after c. 50 AD) against of the Roman Emperor Claudius. There is a rough landscape drawing by Varley on the other side of the sheet.
	Visionary Head of Harold killed at the Battle of Hastings	c. 1819; 155 × 205 mm (Collection of Robert N. Essick.) [Small BVS, p. 76; Varley A15]	Harold Godwinson, or Harold II of England (c. 1022—14 October 1066), the last Anglo-Saxon King of England, was killed at the Battle of Hastings, fighting the Norman invaders led by William the Conqueror. In History of the Normans by Amatus of Montecassino written thirty years after the Battle of Hastings, is given the first report of Harold being shot in the eye with an arrow, as it is clearly depicted by Blake in his drawing. It was mentioned in "Urania" (1825, p. 407): “Mr. Blake's pictures of the last judgment, his profiles of Wallace, Edward the Sixth, Harold, Cleopatra, and numerous others which we have seen, are really wonderful for the spirit in which they are delineated."
	Ghost of a flea, head in profile	c. 1819; Pencil on paper, 189 × 153 mm (Tate Britain, London) [Small BVS, p. 98 (in profile); Butlin #692 98]	Blake's The Ghost of a Flea is depicted twice in the book: in a whole length, p. 94; and his head in profile, p. 98. Here see the Ghost of a Flea and two other heads engraved in Varley's Treatise on Zodiacal Physiognomy.
	The Man who Built the Pyramids	18 October 1819; 300 × 215 mm (Tate Britain, London) [Small BVS, p. 102; Butlin #752]	As G. Keynes noted "Blake has projected into this visionary head of the builder his hatred of the mathematical materialism of the Egyptians and their architecture. A small drawing alongside shows his thick lips parted; the drawing in the centre is presumably the mason's workshop. At the bottom is a book with hieroglyphs on the cover. It is inscribed by Varley with the title below and is dated Oct. 18, 1819" The replica attributed to John Linnell (1825).
	Edward VI? with a spiky collar	c. 1819; 205 × 157 (M. D. E. Clayton-Stamm Collection, England) [Small BVS, p. 108]	G. Keynes inscribed this as an unidentified Visionary Head, "but it may well be a vision of a prince of the royal household. The coat of arms on his shoulder bears three lions of England." Bentley suggests that this is Edward VI.
	Cancer	c. 1820; 165 × 114 mm. (Mr Leonard Baskin, Smith College, Northampton, Mass.) [Small BVS, page c; Butlin #751]	The drawing is inscribed by John Varley as Cancer, the astrological sign, which is associated with the constellation Cancer. However Blake may have intended it as a self-caricature. Jacob Bronowski in his book A Man Without a Mask (1943) named this Prophetic Head of William Blake. Varley included quite a different engraved version of the picture into his Zodiacal Physiognomy (see Bibliography). Here see the engraving of Nebuchadnezzar Coin as Seen in a Vision by Mr. Blake (#709) and Head of Cancer (#751)

== The Large Blake–Varley Sketchbook ==
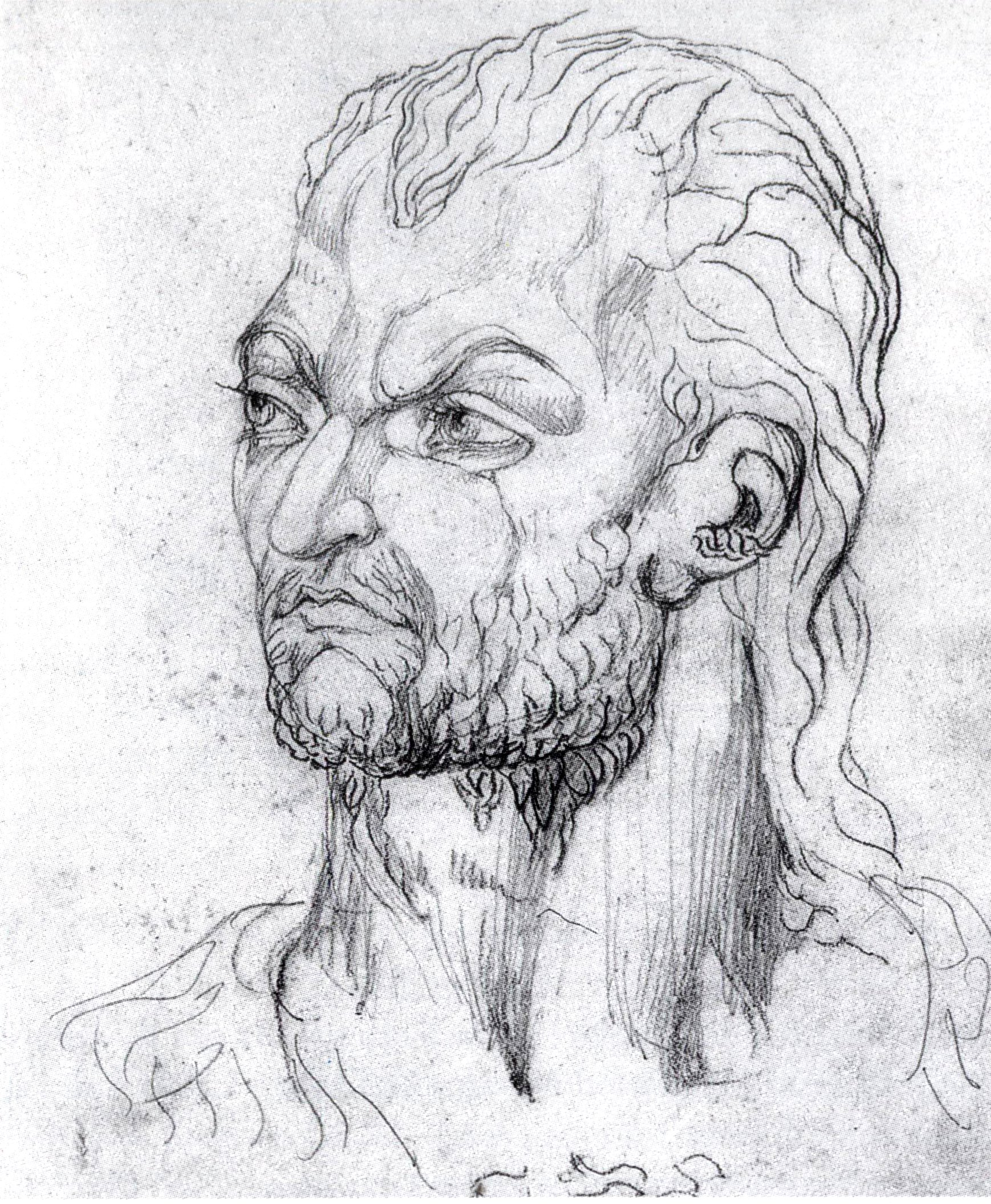
Pp. 59, 77? Owen Glendower

The Sketchbook was sold by Christie's (London) to Mr. Allan Parker. All designs were reproduced in Christie's catalogue 21 March 1989. This is an album 254 × 203 mm with the watermark: C. BRENCHLEY 1804. The leaves were foliated 1–89? and later 22 leaves were razored out and then some of them replaced; this is why the suggested numeration is quite sophisticated. The album contains more than 60 of Blake's pictures including:

- Canute Dark Hair & Eyes (Butlin #721) cut out
- Solomon (#702) cut out
- Cassibelane The British Chief (#716) cut out
- Boadicea (#717) cut out
- Merlin (cut out) [called A Welsh Bard, Job or Moses?]
- Queen Eleanor of Henry II of England and mother of Richard I of England (#727) cut out
- Owen Glendower (#743–744) cut out
- John, King of England (#731) cut out
- Henry Percy (Hotspur) (#745) cut out
- Wat Tyler by Wm Blake, from his spectre (#737) cut out
- Tax gatherer killed by Wat Tyler (#742) cut out
- The Empress Maud, mother of Henry II of England (#725) cut out
- Wat Tyler's daughter (#741) cut out
- Faulconberg the Bastard (#730) cut out
- Alexander the Great
- Henry V of England
- The Black Prince
- Robin Hood
- Pharaoh who knew Joseph
- Joseph's Mistress (Potiphar's wife)
- Perkin Warbeck
- Vortigern
- Rowena
- John Felton the assassinator of the Duke Buckingham
- John Milton when a Boy
- John Milton when Young
- Charlemagne
- John Milton's Youngest Daughter
- John Milton's Eldest Daughter
- Bertrand de Gurdon who wounded Richard Coeur de Lion with an arrow
- The Captain to Richard I who Flayd Bertrand de Gurdon alive
- Jack Sheppard under the Gallows
- Colonel Blood who attempted to steal the Crown
- The Great Earl of Warwick Brother to Edward IV
- Isabella of France wife of Edward II and mother of Edward III
- Robert Bruce King of Scotland
- Geoffrey of Monmouth
- Ossian
- Cornelius Agrippa
- Miss Blandy who poisoned her Father, Mother Brownrigg, Eloise, Countess of Essex who poisoned Overbury, and Pope Joan
- Catherine Hayes Burnt for the Murder of her Husband
- Thomas a Becket Preaching
- Mary, Queen of Scots
- James Hepburn, 4th Earl of Bothwell
- Tom Nixon the Idiot author of the Prophecies
- Pisistratus
- a Daughter of William Shakespeare
- Xantippa wife of Socrates
- Olimpia, probably mother of Alexander the Great
- William Shakespeare's Wife
- Richard Savage the Poet
- Sir Robert Lucy, William Shakespeare's prosecutor

Image	Title	Info	Description
	The Great Earl of Warwick Brother to Edward the 4th Drawn by Wm Blake	c. 1819; 254 × 203 mm. (Collection of Allan Parker. Christie's Images Ltd 2001) [Large BVS, p. 38.]	Richard Neville, 16th Earl of Warwick (1428—1471) was one of the Yorkist leaders in the Wars of the Roses, and instrumental in the deposition of two kings, a fact which later earned him his epithet of "Kingmaker" to later generations. Originally a supporter of King Henry VI (from the House of Lancaster), he then assisted and crowned York's son and his cousin Edward IV becoming effectively a ruler and arbiter of England. Later they fell out over foreign policy and the king's secret marriage to Elizabeth Woodville. After a failed plot to crown Edward's brother, George, Duke of Clarence, Warwick instead restored Henry VI to the throne. However, on 14 April 1471 Warwick was defeated by Edward at the Battle of Barnet, and killed.
	Colonel Blood who attempted to steal the Crown	c. 1819; 254 × 203 mm. (Collection of Allan Parker. Christie's Images Ltd 2001) [Large BVS, p. 39.]	Thomas Blood (1618—1680) was an adventurer who was rewarded with estates in Ireland for his support of Parliament. At the restoration of King Charles II, he was dispossessed. An Anglo-Irish officer and self-styled colonel best known for his attempt to steal the Crown Jewels of England from the Tower of London in 1671. "Blood and three confederates carrying rapiers in canes came to the Tower of London, tied the Keeper of the Regalia and had got out with the Crown, the Globe, and the Sceptre before they were accidentally discovered and caught. Blood refused to confess except to the King himself in a private audience. As a result, his forfeited Irish estates were restored, and Blood become a favourite of the King. Blood's jauntly bravado seems wonderfully credible in Blake's Visionary Head."
	"Owen Glendower"	c. 1819; 254 × 203 mm. (Collection of Allan Parker. Christie's Images Ltd 2001) [Large BVS, p. 59 (also p. 77, Butlin 743–744)]	Owen Glendower or Owain Glyndŵr (c. 1349/1359 — 1416) was a Welsh ruler and the last native Welshman to hold the title Prince of Wales (Tywysog Cymru). He rebelled against Henry IV of England to liberate the Welsh. He was portrayed in William Shakespeare's play Henry IV, Part 1 as a wild and exotic man ruled by magic and emotion. He became in popular memory as a Welsh national hero on par with King Arthur. "The sense of supercilious power in the face is very impressive.."
	Wat Tyler by Wm Blake, from his spectre	c. 1819; 254 × 203 mm, graphite (The Morgan Library & Museum New York City, Gift of Charles Ryskamp, 1999) [Large BVS, p. 73? cut out; Butlin #737]	One of Blake's visionary heads, the drawing is inscribed by John Varley "Wat / Tyler / By Wm Blake from / his Spectre as in the act of Striking the Tax / Gatherer on the head. Drawn / Octr 30.1819 1h AM." Wat Tyler (1341—1381) the leader of the 1381 Peasants' Revolt in England. He marched a group of protesters from Canterbury to the capital to oppose the institution of a poll tax. Tyler was killed by officers of King Richard II during negotiations at Smithfield in London. Perhaps Blake felt a kinship based upon his own antimonarchical stance that had led to a trial for sedition in Felpham about 15 years earlier.

== The Folio Blake–Varley Sketchbook ==
The folio size Blake-Varley Sketchbook has not been discovered in whole. However, three loose pages with the visionary heads of Pindar, Corinna and Lais are extant. The available images are from a 42 × 27 cm album with the watermark: W TURNER & SON.

Image	Title	Info	Description
	Corinna the Rival of Pindar and Corinna the Grecian Poetess	c. 1820; 262 – 417 mm (University of Kansas Museum of Art, Lawrence, Kansas, USA) [Butlin #708]	The two sketches of the same head shown both full face and in profile with half-opened mouth as she reads her poetry. There is drawing of Corinna in profile in the Small BVS, page 80. This drawing razored from the Folio BVS is mentioned by Allan Cunningham (1830): "Observe the poetic fervour of that face—it is Pindar as he stood a conqueror in the Olympic games. And this lovely creature is Corinna, who conquered in poetry in the same place. That lady is Lais, the courtesan—with the impudence which is part of her profession, she stept in between Blake and Corinna, and he was obliged to paint her to get her away..."
	Visionary Head of Corinna The Theban – Detail 1	(Butlin #708A)	Corinna or Korinna (Greek: Κόριννα) an Ancient Greek poetess who probably lived in the 6th century BC came from Tanagra in Boeotia, where she was a teacher and rival to the famous Theban poet Pindar. Pausanias says she won a poetry competition against Pindar and her success was probably chiefly due to her beauty and her use of the local Boeotian dialect, instead of the Doric of Pindar's poems. In honour of this victory she had a monument erected to her.
	Visionary Head of Corinna The Theban – Detail 2	(Butlin #708B)	As Claudius Aelianus (c. 175 – c. 235) said she defeated Pindar five times, and in response to these defeats, Pindar called her a sow. Antipater of Thessalonica lists her in his catalogue of nine mortal muses. Blake could be familiar with these stories.

== Loose Visionary Heads ==
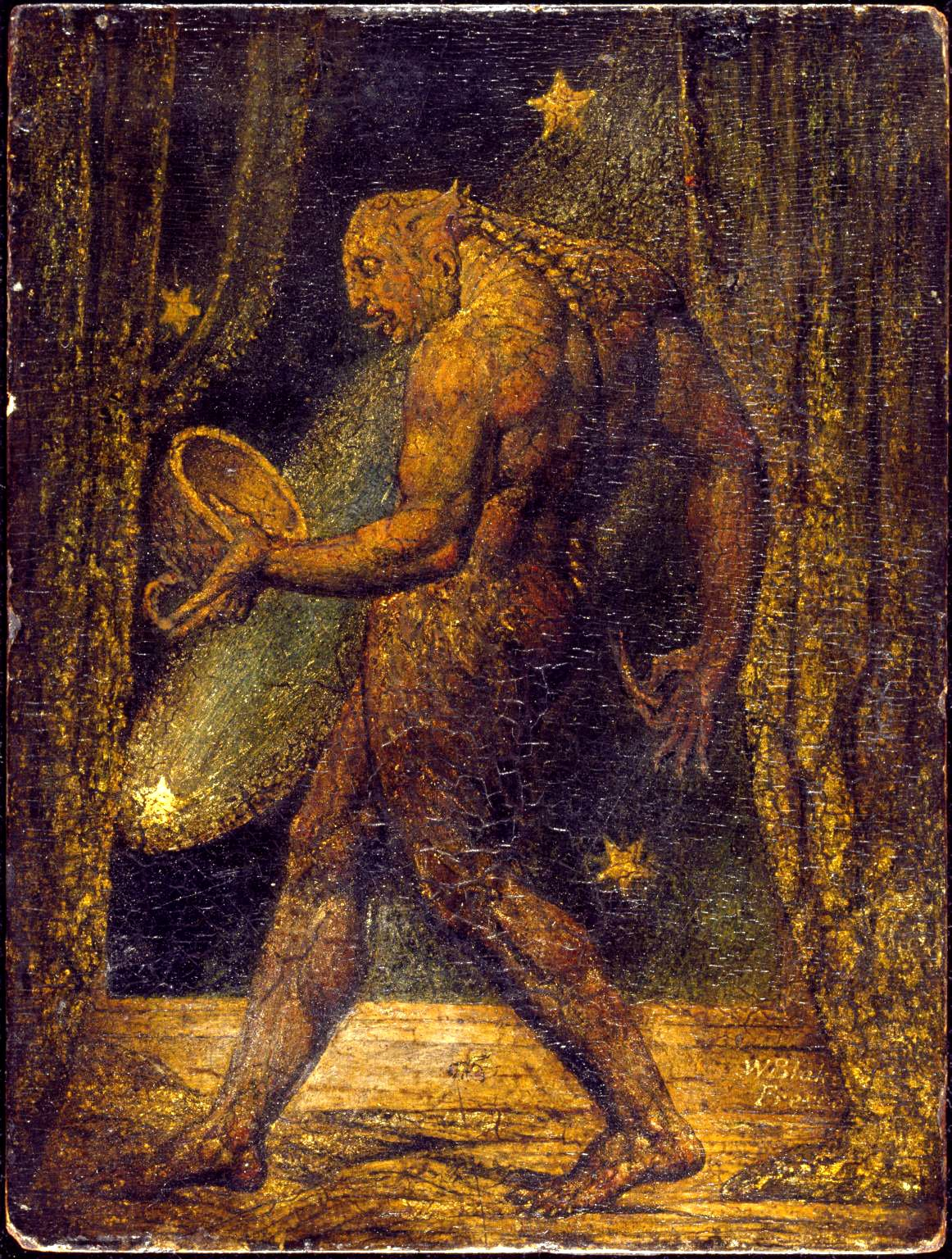
The Ghost of a Flea (tempera)

There are more than 50 loose visionary heads including:

- Satan with a plumed helmet (Butlin #693)
- Satan as a fiend at Blake's grated window (#694)
- Lot (#695)
- The Egyptian Task master who was killed & Buried by Moses and Saul King of Israel under the influence of the Evil Spirit (#696)
- Saul (#697)
- David (#698)
- Uriah and Bathsheba (#699)
- Solomon (#700)
- Job (#703)
- Nebuchadnezzar Coin as Seen in a Vision by Mr. Blake (#704)
- Joseph and Mary & the room They were seen in (#705)
- Head of Achilles (#707)
- Lais and a foot and ankle (#712)
- Socrates (#713 & #714)
- A young faun (#715)
- Boadicea? (#718)
- Caractacus, counterproof (#719)
- Muhammad (#720)
- Canute, counterproof (#723)
- Queen Eleanor of Aquitaine, wife of Henry II of England and mother of Richard I of England (#726)
- The Assassin lying dead at the feet of Ed. I & Saladin. (#728)
- Richard Coeur de Lion (#729)
- William Wallace and Edward I (#734)
- King Edward I (#735)
- King Edward III (#735, 736)
- Gray the Poet and Friar Bacon (#746)
- Henry VIII? as a youth (#747)
- Old Tom Parr when Young (#748)
- The spirit of Voltaire by Blake (#749)
- The Ghost of a Flea, tempera (#750)
- The Man who built the Pyramids drawn by Willam Blake, Oct. 18, 1819. (#752)
- The Man Who Taught Blake Painting in his Dreams (#753)
- Imagination of A man who Mr Blake has recd instruct[ion] in Painting &c from, counterproof (#754)
- The Portrait of a Man who instructed Mr Blake in Painting &c, in his Dreams and Imagination of A man who Mr Blake has recd instruct[ion] in Painting &c from, replica (?by Linnell) (#755)
- Visionary Head (#759)
- Five Visionary Heads (Heads of Women) 270x324mm (#765)

etc.

Image	Title	Info	Description
	Uriah the Husband of Bathsheba and Bathsheba	c. 1820; 205 x 330 mm. watermark "JH 1818"; (Henry E. Huntington Library and Art Gallery, San Marino, Cal.) [Butlin #699]	The two heads in profile drawn for Varley and Linnell.
	Head of Job	c. 1823; 260 x 200 mm. watermark "SMITH & ALLNUTT 1815"; (Sir Geoffrey Keynes Collection) [Butlin #703]	"This very careful drawing was certainly made in connection with Blake's Illustrations of the Book of Job. It most resembles Job's aspect in no 14 of the series, where Job is looking up to the Heaven and the Sons of God shouting for Joy.."
	Joseph and Mary & the room They were seen in	c. 1820; 200 x 315 mm. (Henry E. Huntington Library and Art Gallery, San Marino, Cal.) [Butlin #705; Varley A30, B38]	There are carefully drawn the visionary images of the youthful pair with their heads inclined towards one another. The hands of Mary are crossed on her breasts. Between their heads we can see a small drawing of "the room they were seen in" Blake's vision as full-length figures with a bed in the background. "Behind Joseph is a tall bearded figure, presumably his father." The title or inscription by Varley (or Linnell) is placed on the other side of the sheet.
	Socrates, a Visionary Head	c. 1820; 219 x 184 mm; Graphite on medium, moderately textured, cream wove paper; (Yale Center for British Art, Paul Mellon Collection). [Butlin #714]	Lettering inscribed in graphite, verso, lower left: "Socrates"; in graphite, verso, lower center: "Gilchrist 72"; in graphite, verso, lower right: "Aspland 69"; in graphite, verso, lower right, circled: "1"; in graphite, verso, lower right: "K[...]" Henry Crabb Robinson recalled in his "Reminiscences" on 23 February 1852: "This was on the 10th of December [1825]... in answer to a question from me, he said, 'The Spirits told me.' This lead me to say: Socrates used pretty much the same language. He spoke of his Genius. Now, what affinity or resemblance do you suppose was there between the Genius which inspired Socrates and your Spirits? He smiled, and for once it seemed to me as if he had a feeling of vanity gratified.[14] 'The same as in our countenances.' He paused and said, 'I was Socrates'—and then as if he had gone too far in that—'or a sort of brother. I must have had conversations with him. So I had with Jesus Christ. I have an obscure recollection of having been with both of them.'"
	Queen Eleanor	c. 1820; 195 x 155 mm; (Henry E. Huntington Library and Art Gallery, San Marino, Cal.) [Butlin #726; Varley A9, B23]	The image was inscribed as "Queen Eleanor, wife of Edward I" by Martin Butlin and Geoffrey Keynes probably mistakenly, because G. E. Bentley Jr. pointed that the "Visionary Head of Queen Eleanor, wife of Edward I" was untraced. Probably this is Eleanor of Aquitaine (of Poitou), wife of Henry II of England and mother of Richard I, as it was described in Varley's list A9 in the Large BVS.
	The Assassin lying dead at the feet of Edward I & Saladin	c. 1820; 223 x 140 mm; watermark "SMITH & ALLNUTT 1815"; (Henry E. Huntington Library and Art Gallery, San Marino, Cal.) [Butlin #728]	Two heads in profile drawn for John Varley. Above is a man lying on his back inscribed: The Assassin laying dead at the feet of Ed. I in the holy land. He was a messenger from Emir of Jaffa, who attempted to kill King Edward I during his crusade in 1272. Below is a head of Saladin, Sultan of Egypt during the third Crusade in the 12th century.
	William Wallace & Edward Ist	c. 1819; 198 x 269 mm (Collection of Robert N. Essick.) [Butlin #734]	"The Scottish patriot William Wallace (1270—1305) appeared to Blake and then replaced by his mortal enemy Edward I (1272—1307), both of whom Blake recognized on sight. Linnell copied the drawings in October—November 1819."
	Visionary Head of Edward III?	c. 1819; 240 x 204 mm, watermark "J GREEN 1819" black chalk & pencil [Butlin #735], Collection of W. W. Appleton	"During Blake's sanguinary conversation with him, the king, displeased, 'bends the battlement of his brow upon you'." In his youth Blake wrote the dramatic play “King Edward III”. Here is the beginning of King's monologue from the 3rd scene: O Liberty, how glorious art thou! I see thee hov'ring o'er my army, with Thy wide-stretch'd plumes; I see thee Lead them on to battle; I see thee blow thy golden trumpet, while Thy sons shout the strong shout of victory!
	Gray the Poet & Friar Bacon	c. 1820; 197 x 162 mm, (Pembroke College, Cambridge, England) [Butlin #746]	Two Visionary Heads in profile. On the right: Roger Bacon (c.1214—1294) English philosopher and Franciscan friar who placed considerable emphasis on the study of nature through empirical methods; and on the left: Thomas Gray, (1716—1771) English poet, classical scholar and professor at Cambridge University widely known for his "Elegy Written in a Country Churchyard", published in 1751. Blake created a series of 116 folio watercolor illustrations to his poems in 1797–98.
	Old Tom Parr when Young (#748)	c. 1820; 300 x 185 mm watermark "1810"; (Henry E. Huntington Library and Art Gallery, San Marino, Cal.) [Butlin #748]	Thomas Parr was an aged countryman reputed to be 153 years old. The drawing inscribed "old Parr when young, Viz 40" and "Aug 1820/W. Blake fecit."
	Spirit of Voltaire by Blake	c. 1820; 230 x 152 mm (Dr John Lipscomb, Canterbury, England) [Butlin #749]	The title was inscribed by John Varley. Blake made a portrait of Voltaire for Hayley, library in 1800, he quoted Voltaire in his marginalia to Reynjlds, mentioned in his "An Island in the Moon", satiric verses and in "The Everlasting Gospel": This was Spoke by My Spectre to Voltaire Bacon &c Did Jesus teach Doubt or did he Give any lessons of Philosophy; Charge Visionaries with Deceiving; Or call Men wise for not Believing
	A Visionary Head	c. 1819–20; 191 x 143 mm; Graphite on medium, moderately textured, cream wove paper; (Yale Center for British Art, Paul Mellon Collection). [Butlin #759]	Lettering Inscribed in brown ink, lower left: "Blakes writing on the Back-"; in brown ink, lower center: "Drawn by William Blake-"; in brown ink, lower right: "one of the heads of Personages Blake used to call up & see & sketch, supposed rapidly drawn from his Vision. Frederick Tatham"; inscribed on verso in graphite, center right: "Scale of Ten Feet". Verso: Sketch of a Monument. "Perhaps #758—9 are the two unidentified Visionary Heads referred to on the backing of Blake's sketch of the Last Judgement (Butlin #643) as "sketches from personages as they appeared to him in Vision. Blake asserted that he saw these people in vision & he sketched from what he saw in Vision. F. Tatham".
	Five Visionary Heads of Women	c. 1819–20; 270 x 324 mm; Graphite on medium, moderately textured, cream wove paper; (Yale Center for British Art, Paul Mellon Collection). [Butlin #765]	Lettering Inscribed in graphite, lower right: "These are heads he used to see of deceased worthies in vision [...]"; inscribed in graphite, verso, lower right: "[...] Guiness"
	Imagination of A man who Mr Blake has recd instruct[ion] in Painting &c from, counterproof	c. 1819; 295 x 235 mm (Tate Britain) [Butlin #754]	There are some more drawings to the same subject: The Man Who Taught Blake Painting in his Dreams (#753) The Portrait of a Man who instructed Mr Blake in Painting &c, in his Dreams and Imagination of A man who Mr Blake has recd instruct[ion] in Painting &c from, replica (?by Linnell) (#755).
	The Man Who Taught Blake Painting in his Dreams	c. 1825; 260 x 206 mm; Graphite on paper (Tate Britain) [Butlin #755]	This copy of Blake's drawing attributed to John Linnell. "The minutely-depictes shape of the skull is probably influenced by the newly-modish study of phrenology. The portrait bears a disconcerting resemblance to Blake's selfportrait of 16 years previously" (i. e. in 1802).

== Some other Visionary Heads (in the order of Martin Butlin Catalogue) ==
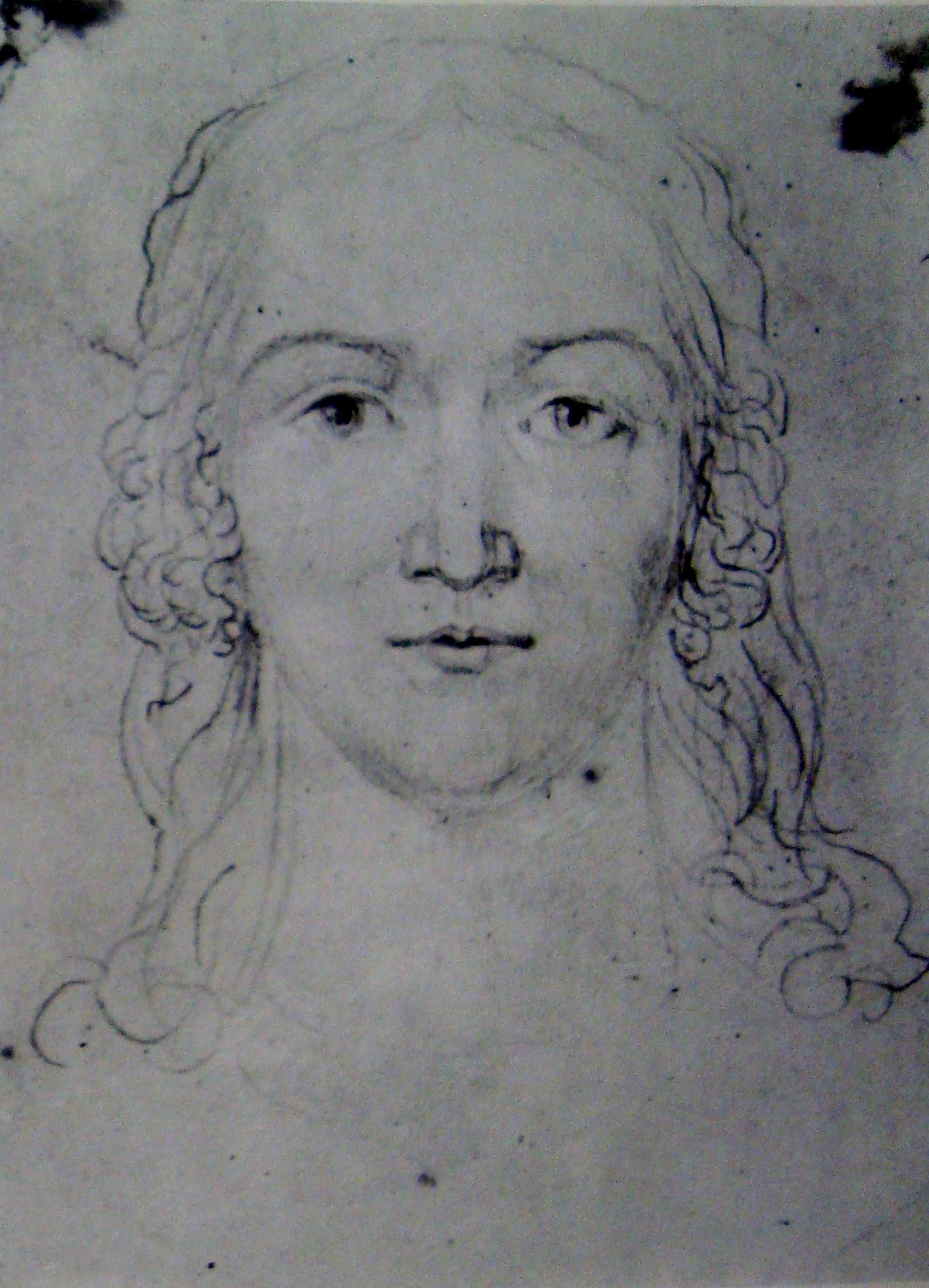
A Head of a Young Woman, Butlin #686 recto c 1820 183x188mm – McGill University Library, Montreal

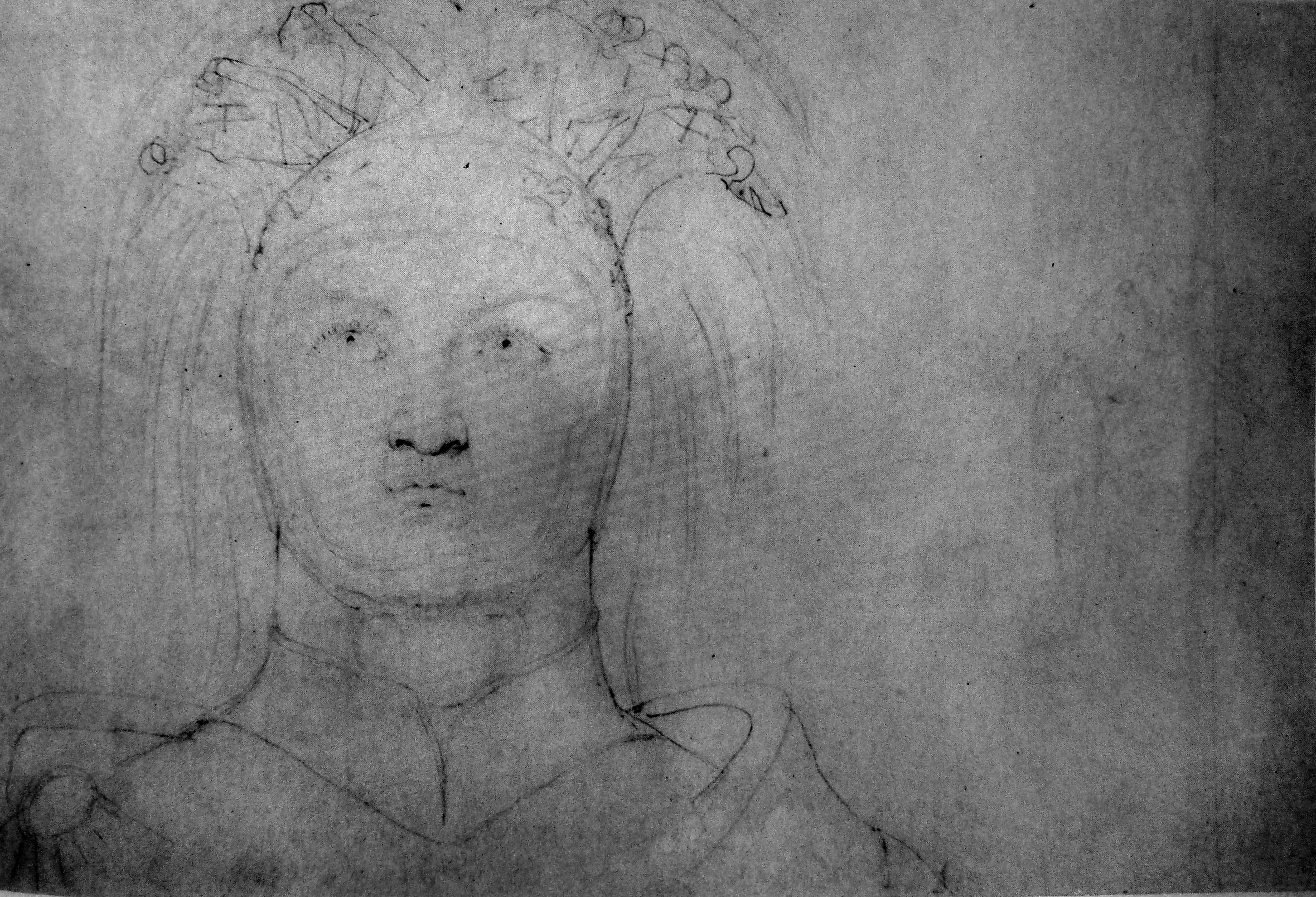
Satan, Butlin #693 c 1819-20 232x311mm - Smith College Museum of Art, Northampton, Massachusetts

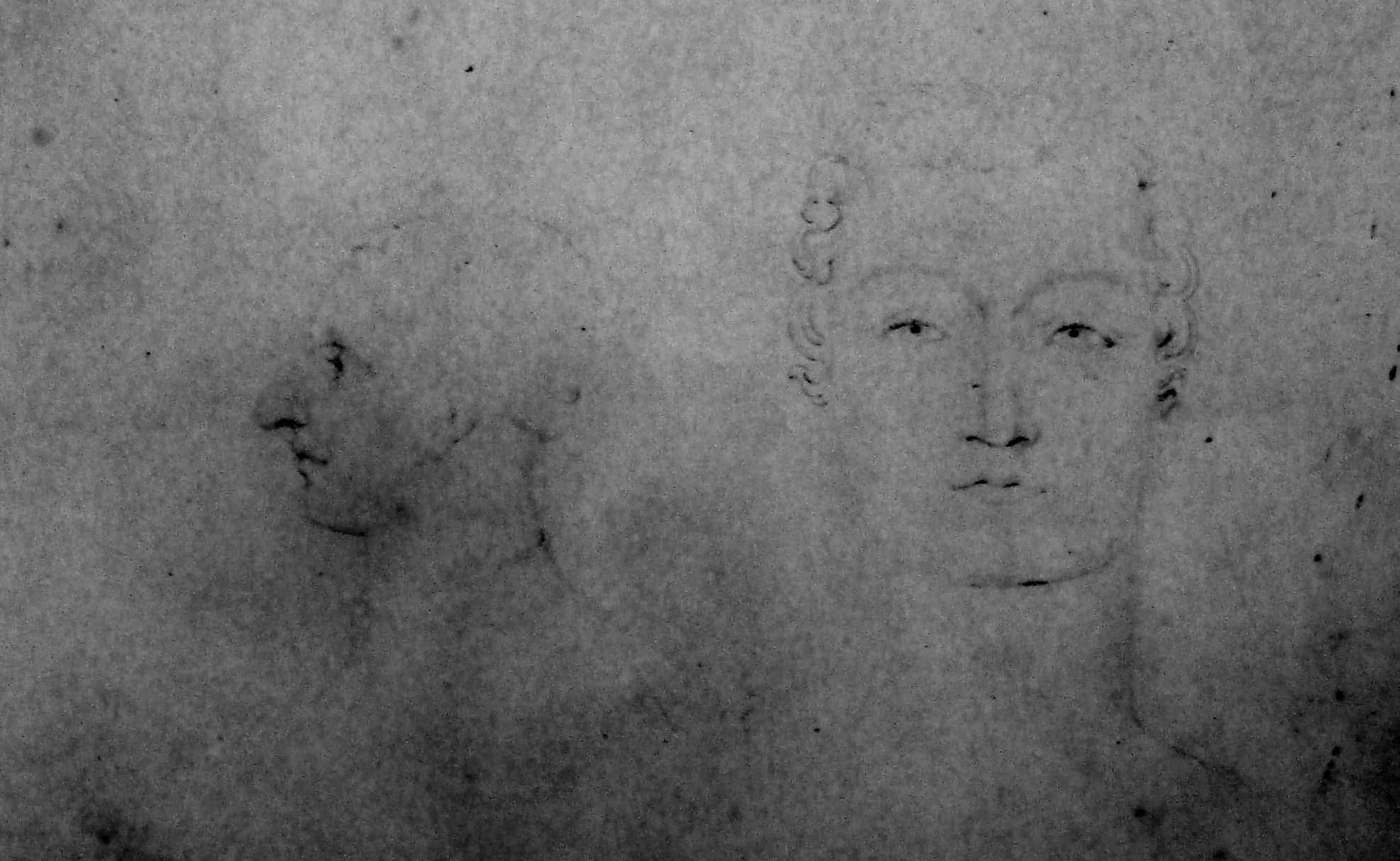
The Egyptian Taskmaster & Saul, Butlin #696 1819-20 120x90mm – Private collection, Yorkshire

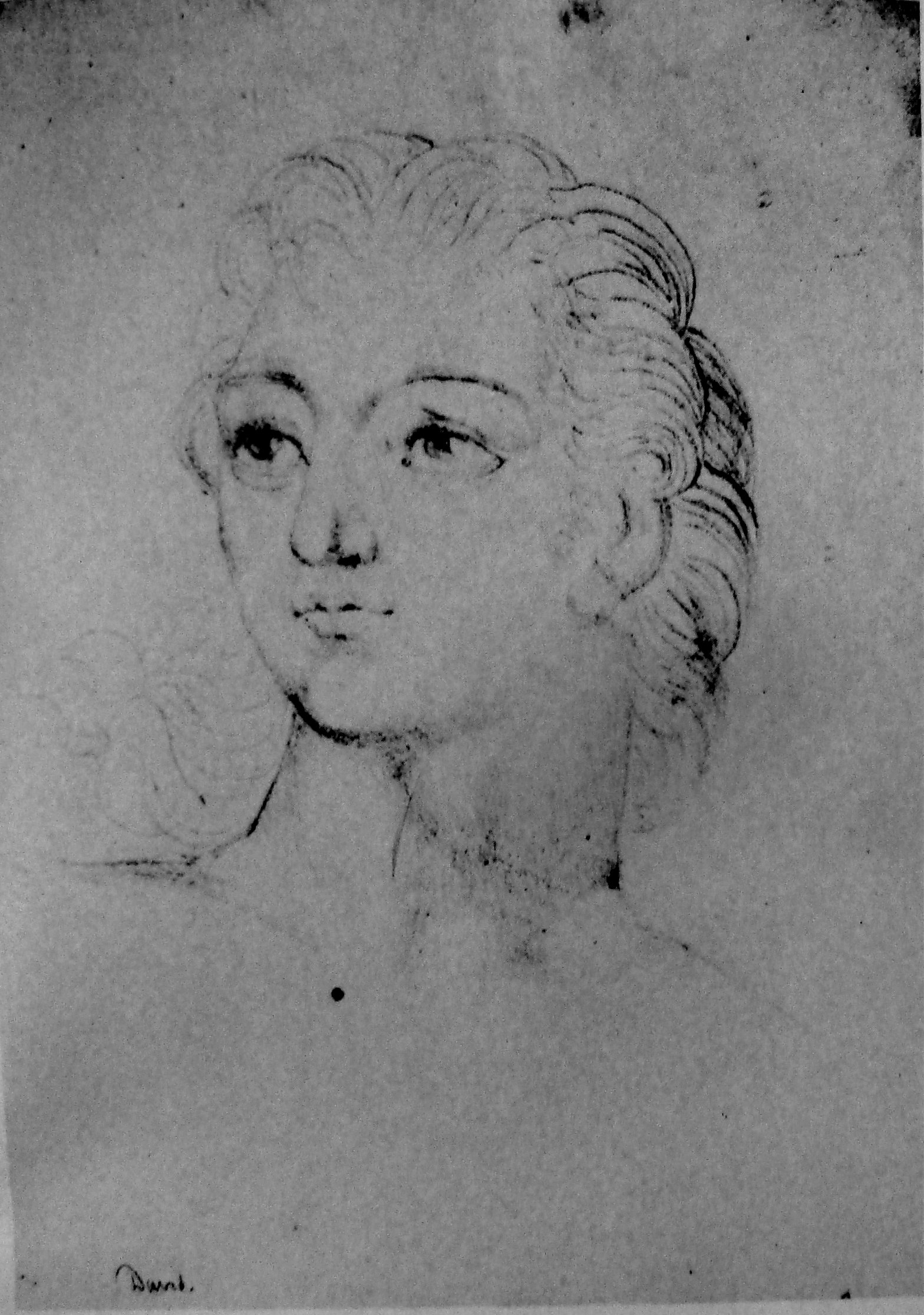
David, Butlin #698 c 1819-20 254x180mm - F Bailey Vanderhoef Jr - Ojai California

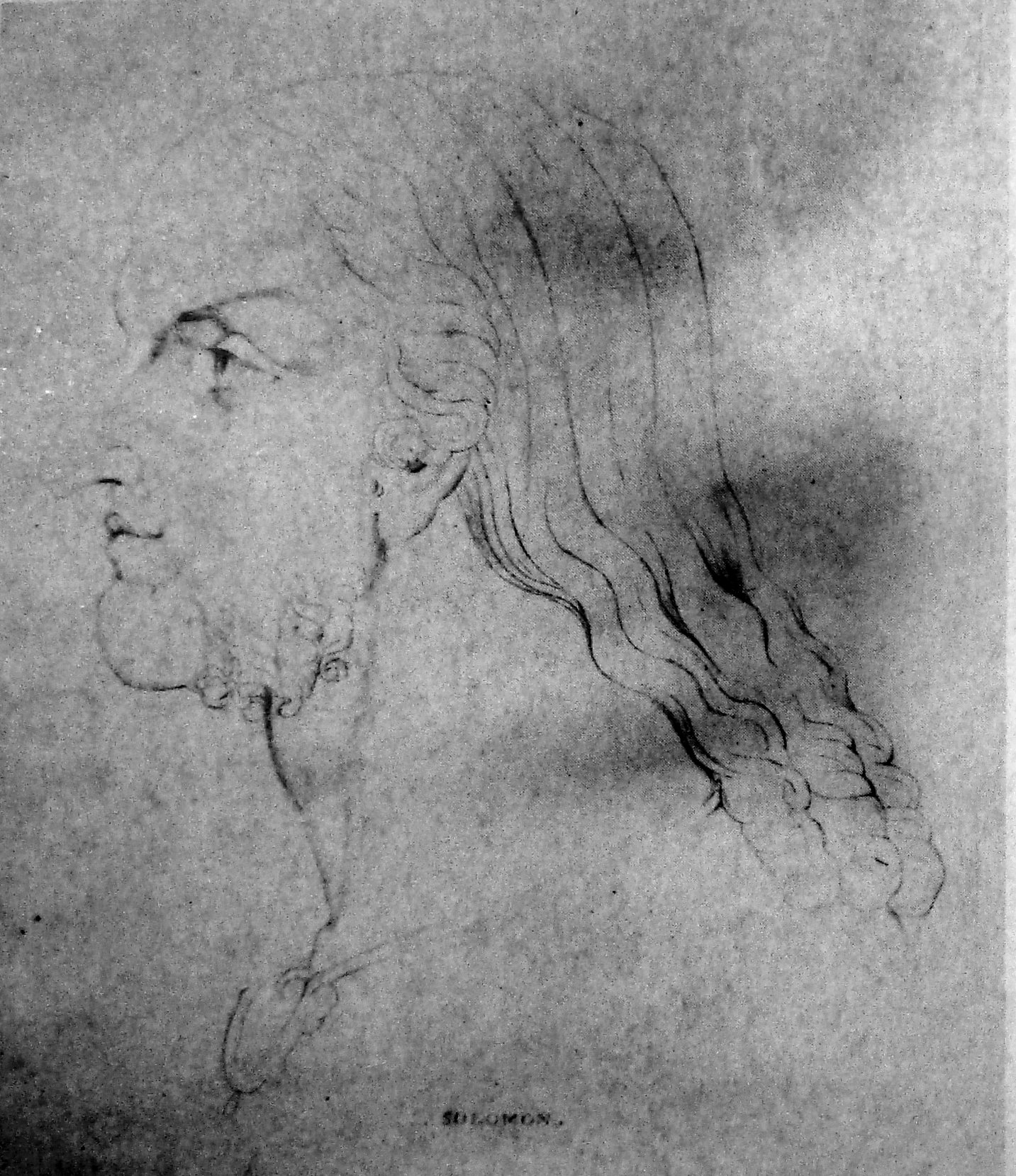
Solomon, Butlin #701 c 1819-20 255x211mm – Edwin Wolf 2nd, Philadelphia

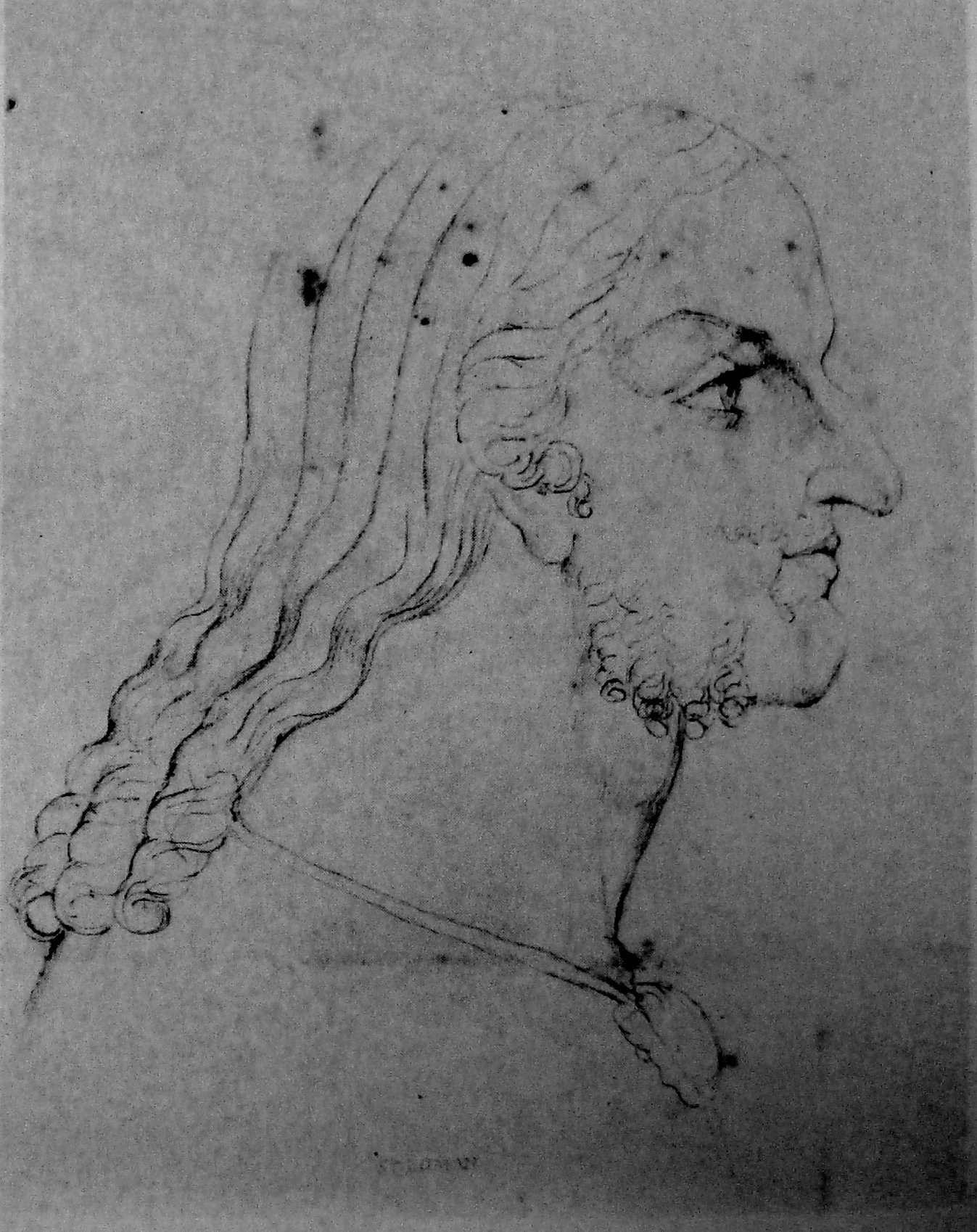
Solomon, counterproof, Butlin #702 c 1819-20 255x211mm - Huntington Library and Art Gallery, San Marino, California.jpg

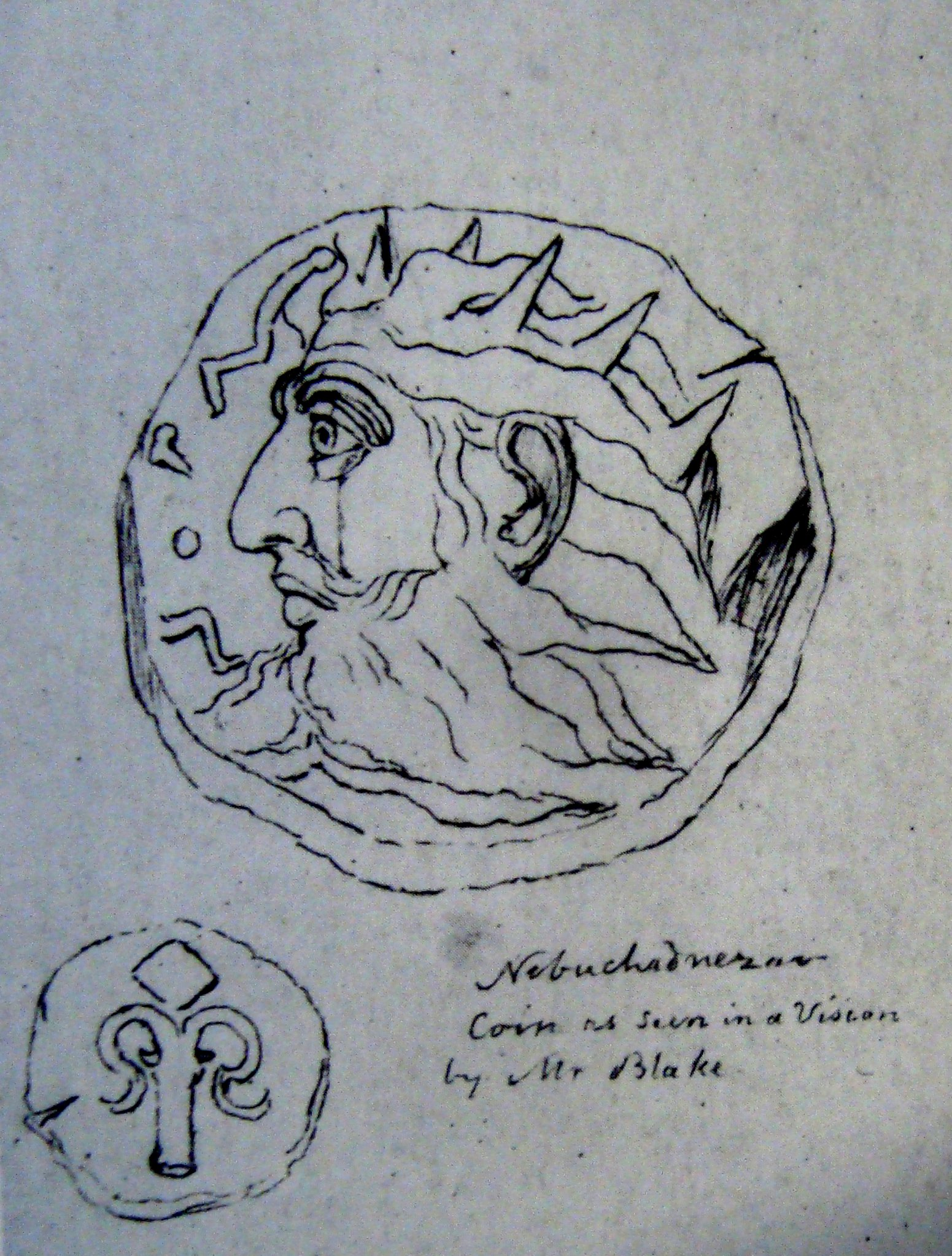
Nebuchadnezzar Coin, Butlin #704 (tracing by Linnell) 45x50mm G Ingli James Cardiff

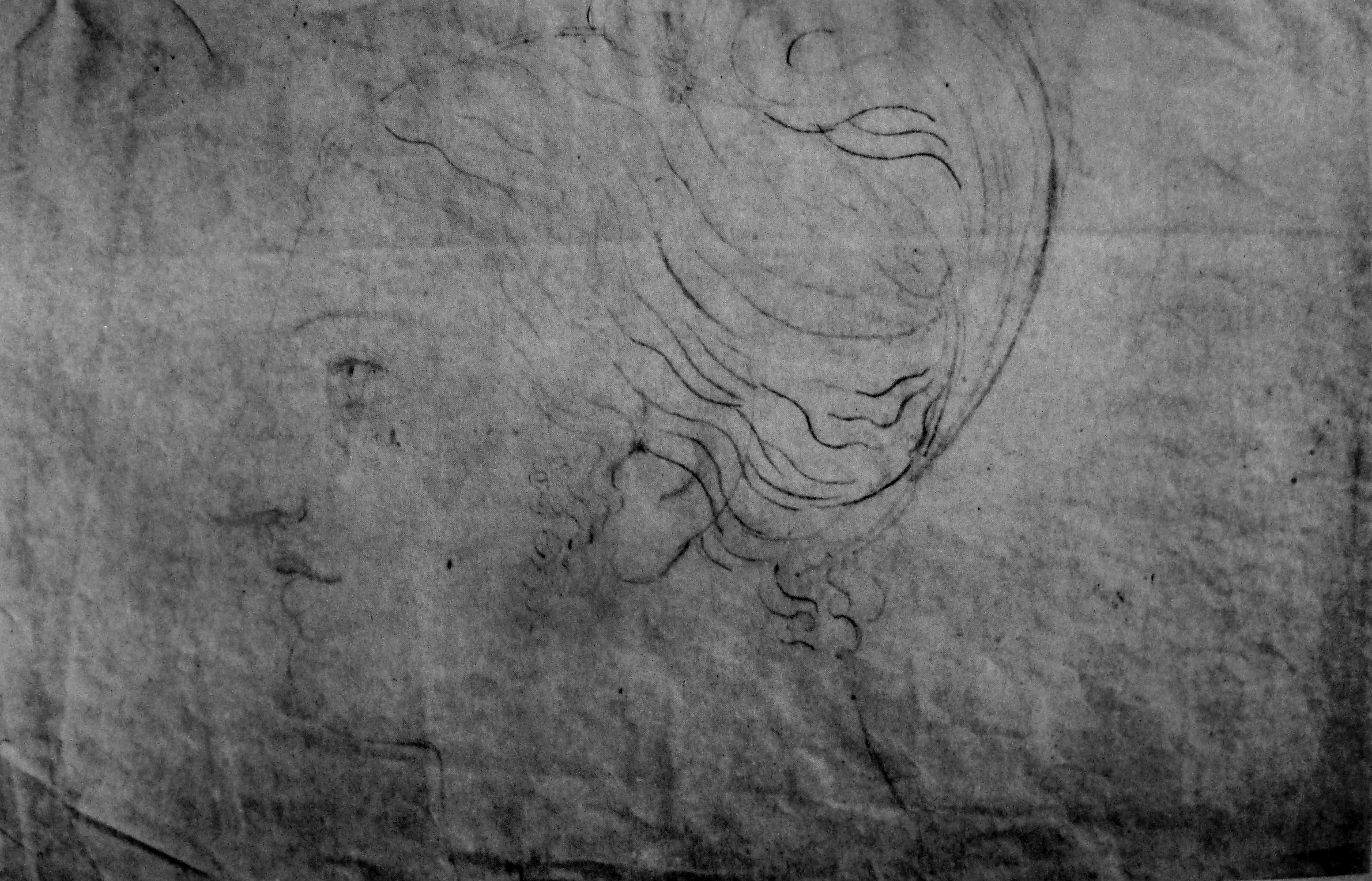
William Blake - A Female Head, Butlin #709, c 1819–20, 240x385mm – Untraced since 1949

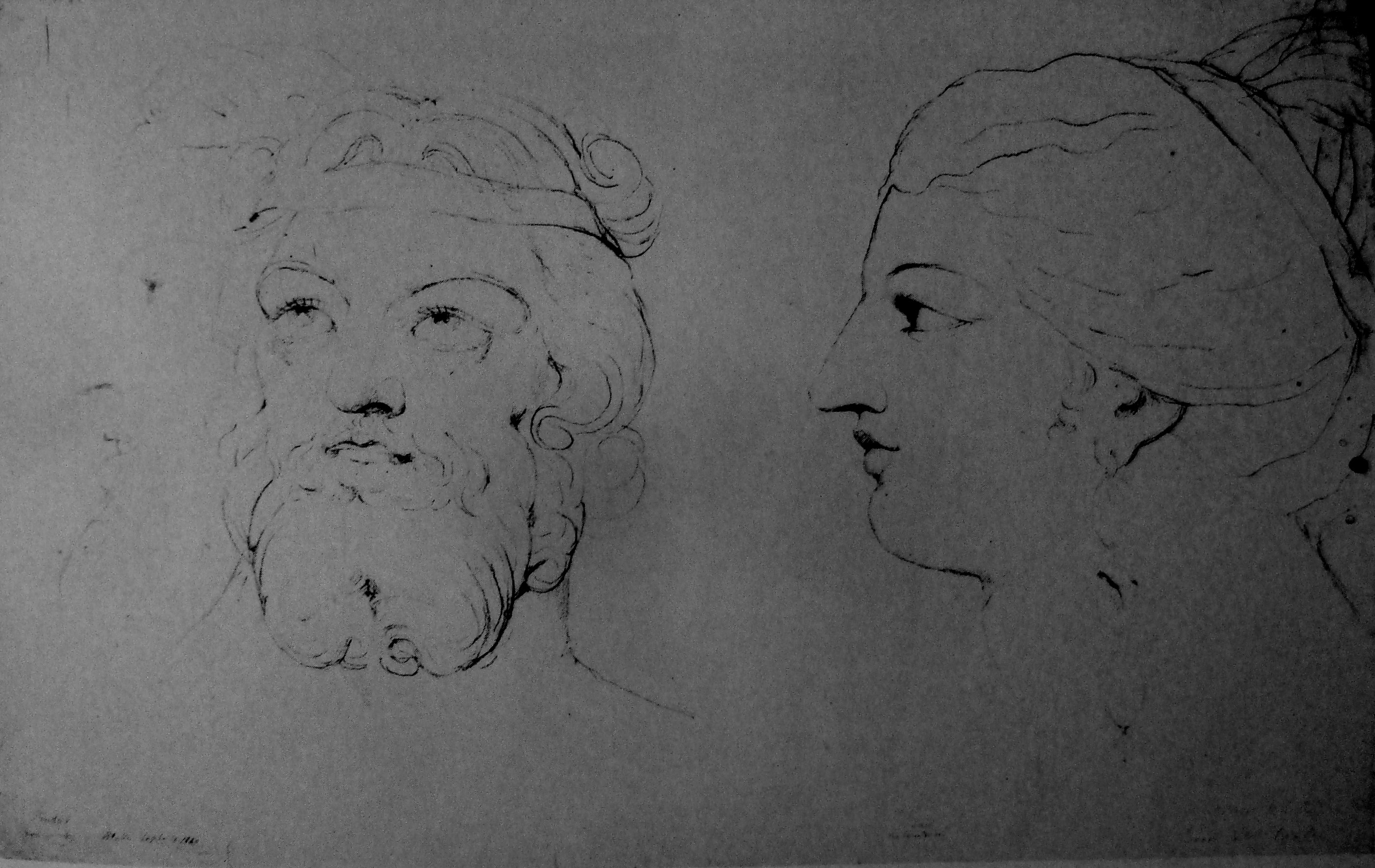
Pindar and Lais the Courtesan, Butlin #711, c 1820, 267x419mm - Harris Museum and Art Gallery, Preston. Lancashire

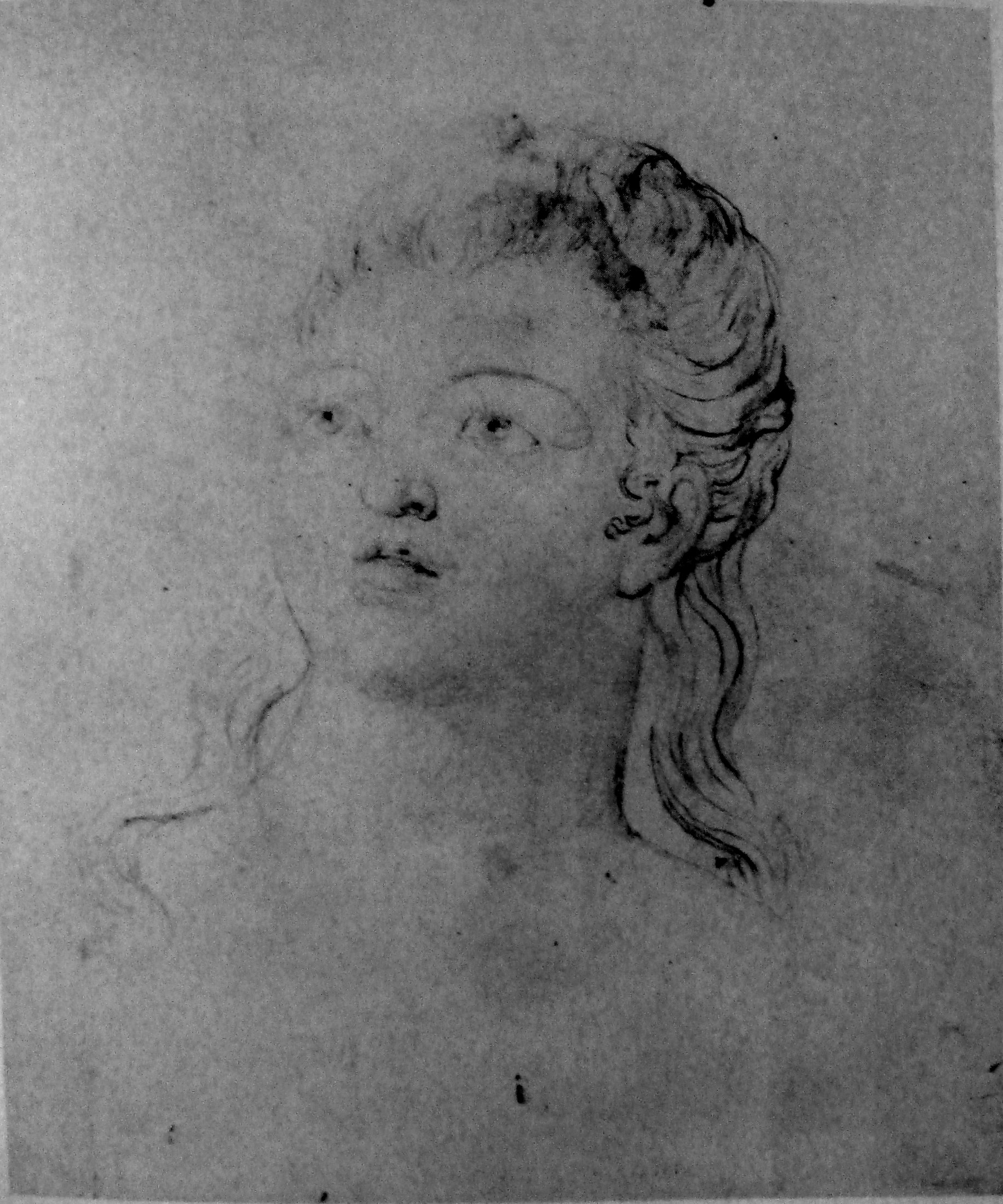
Lais of Corinth, Butlin #712 recto c 1820, 150x140mm - Private Collection, Great Britain

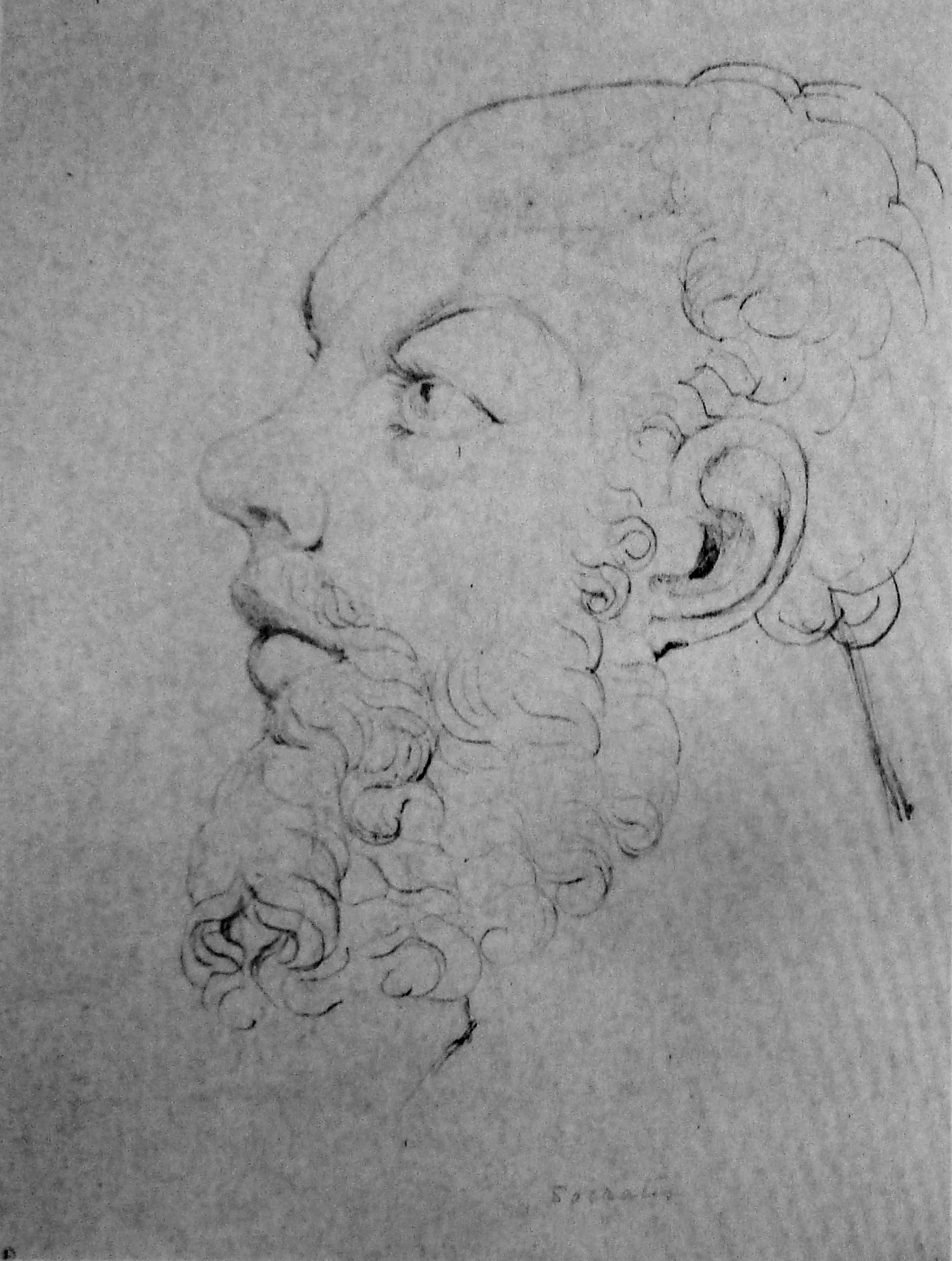
File:William Blake - Socrates, Butlin #713 c 1819-20 313x201mm - Huntington Library and Art Gallery, San Marino, California

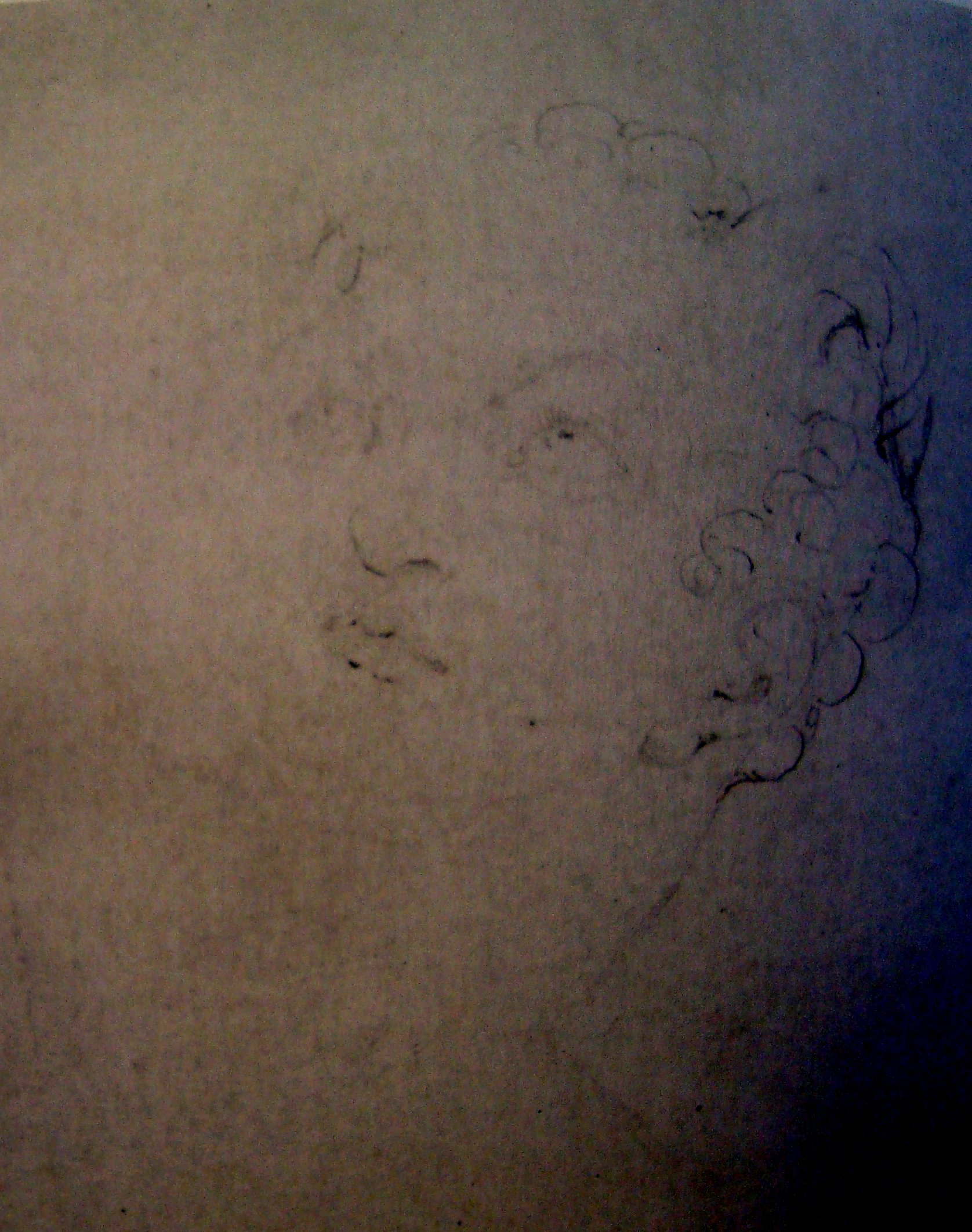
Classic Head of a Young Faun, 715 c 1819–20, 227x189mm – Private Collection, Great Britain

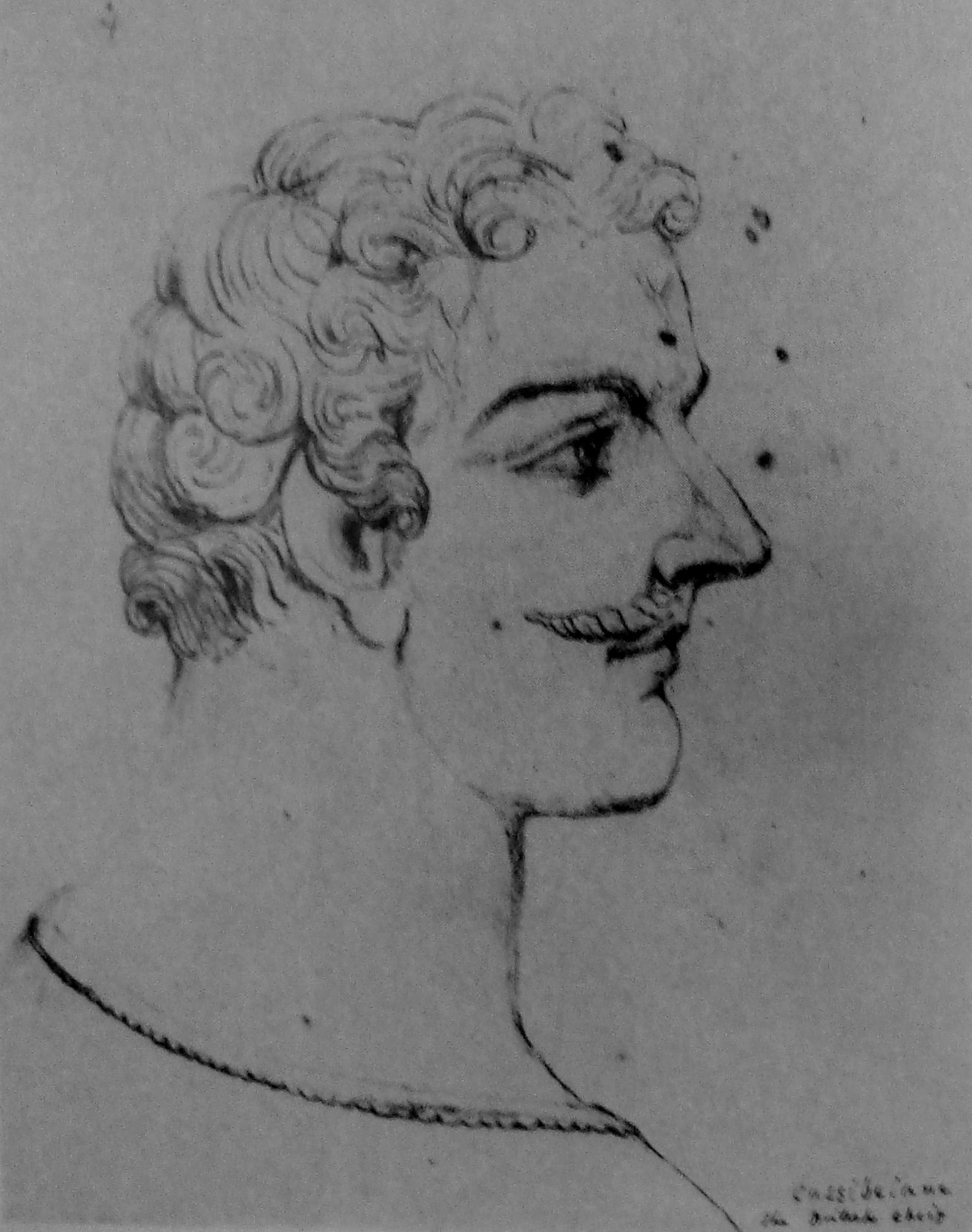
Cassibelane, Butlin #716 c 1819-20 233x176mm - F Bailey Vanderhoef Jr - Ojai California

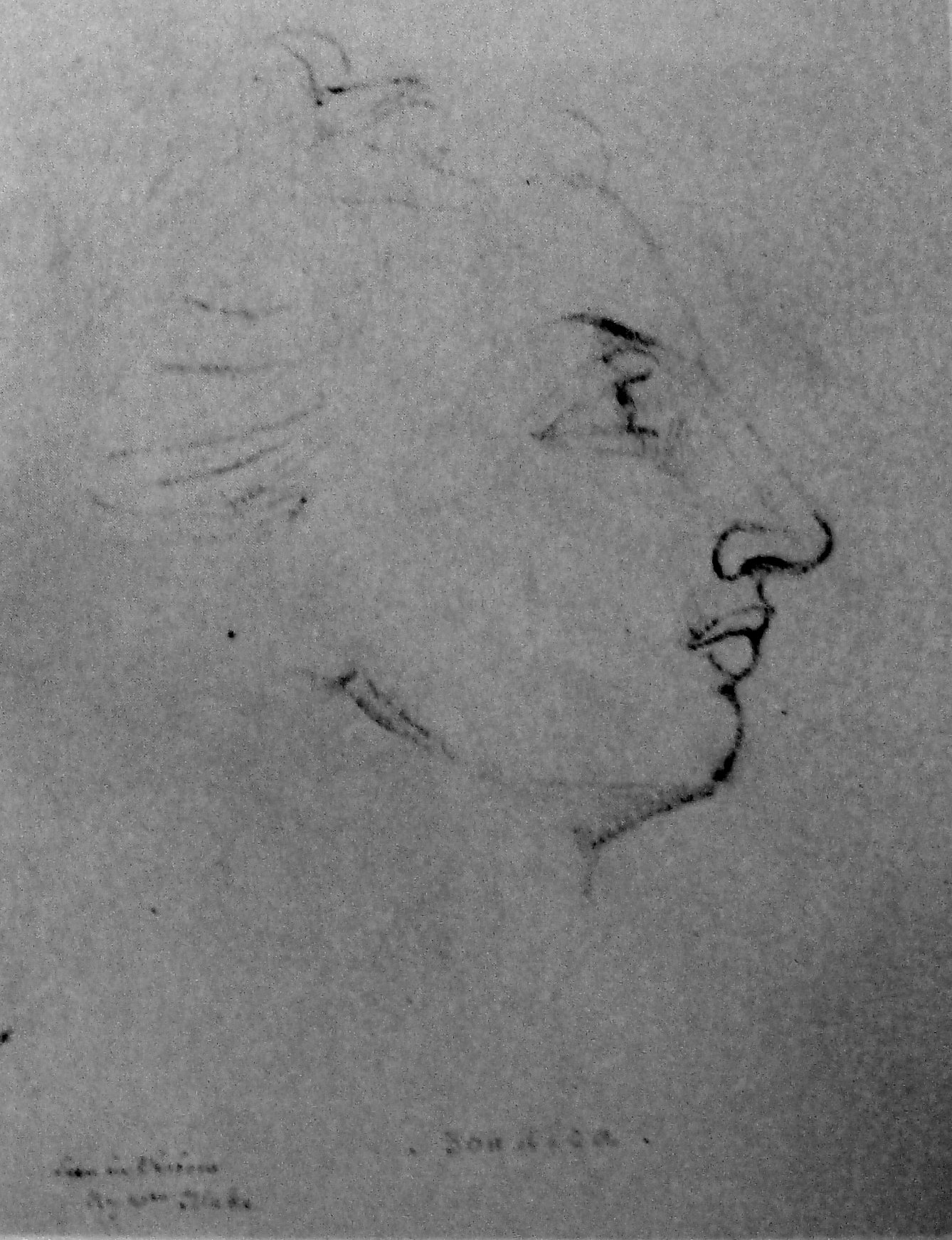
Boadicea, Butlin #717 c 1819-20 205x160mm - Joseph Holland - Los Angeles, California

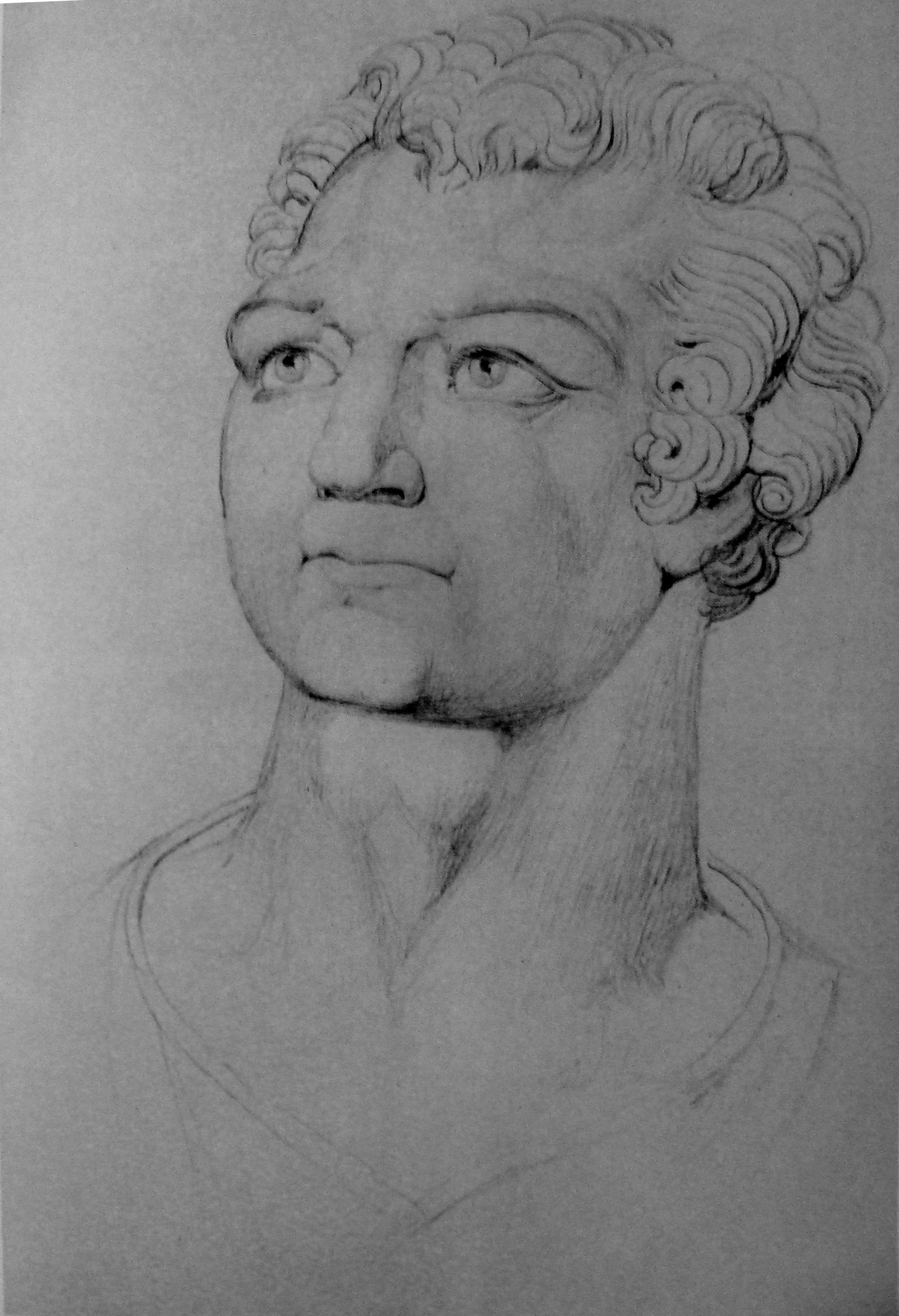
Mahomet, Butlin #720 c 1819 311x107mm - Santa Barbara

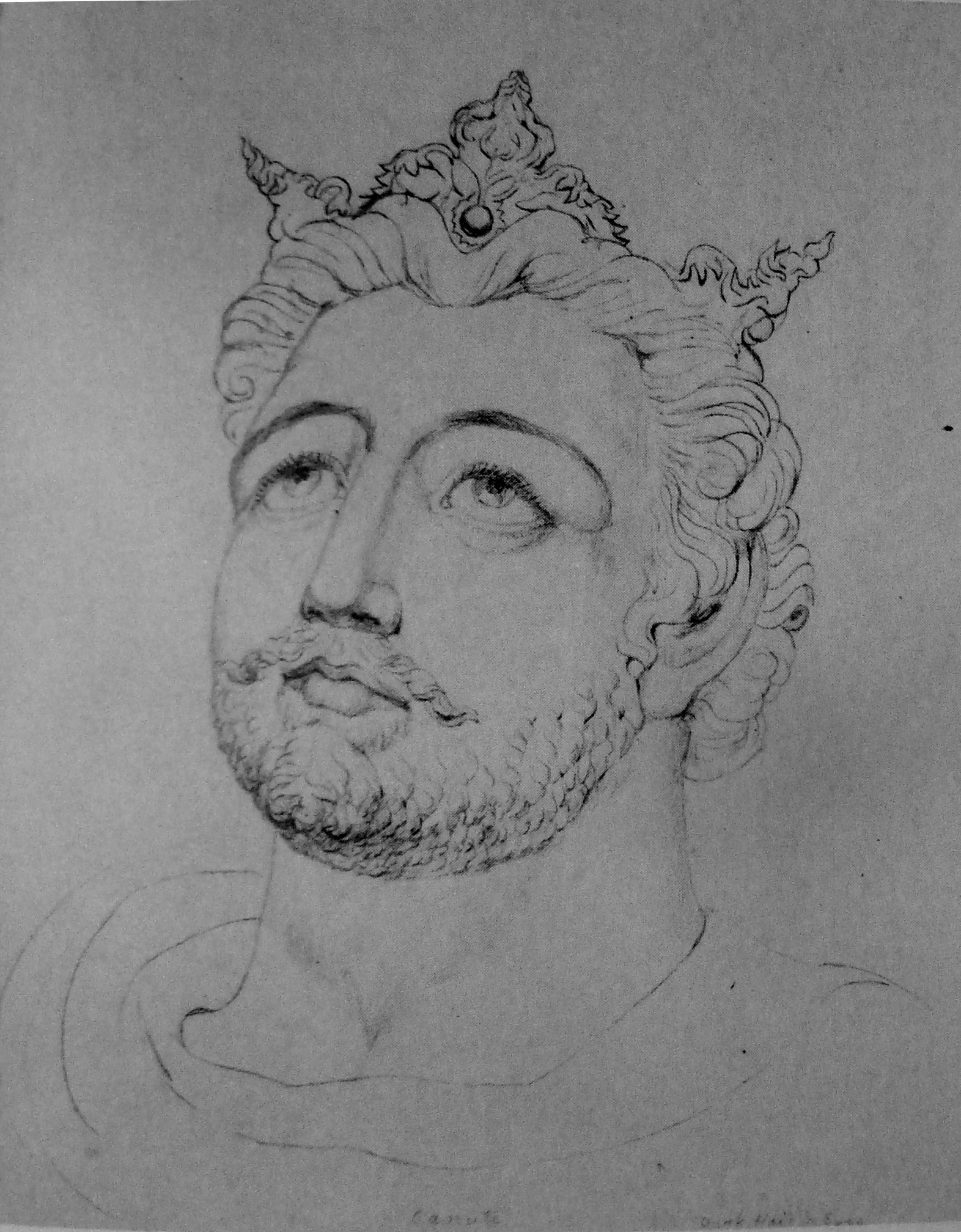
Canute, Butlin #721 c 1819-20 258x203mm -National Gallery of Art, Washington DC

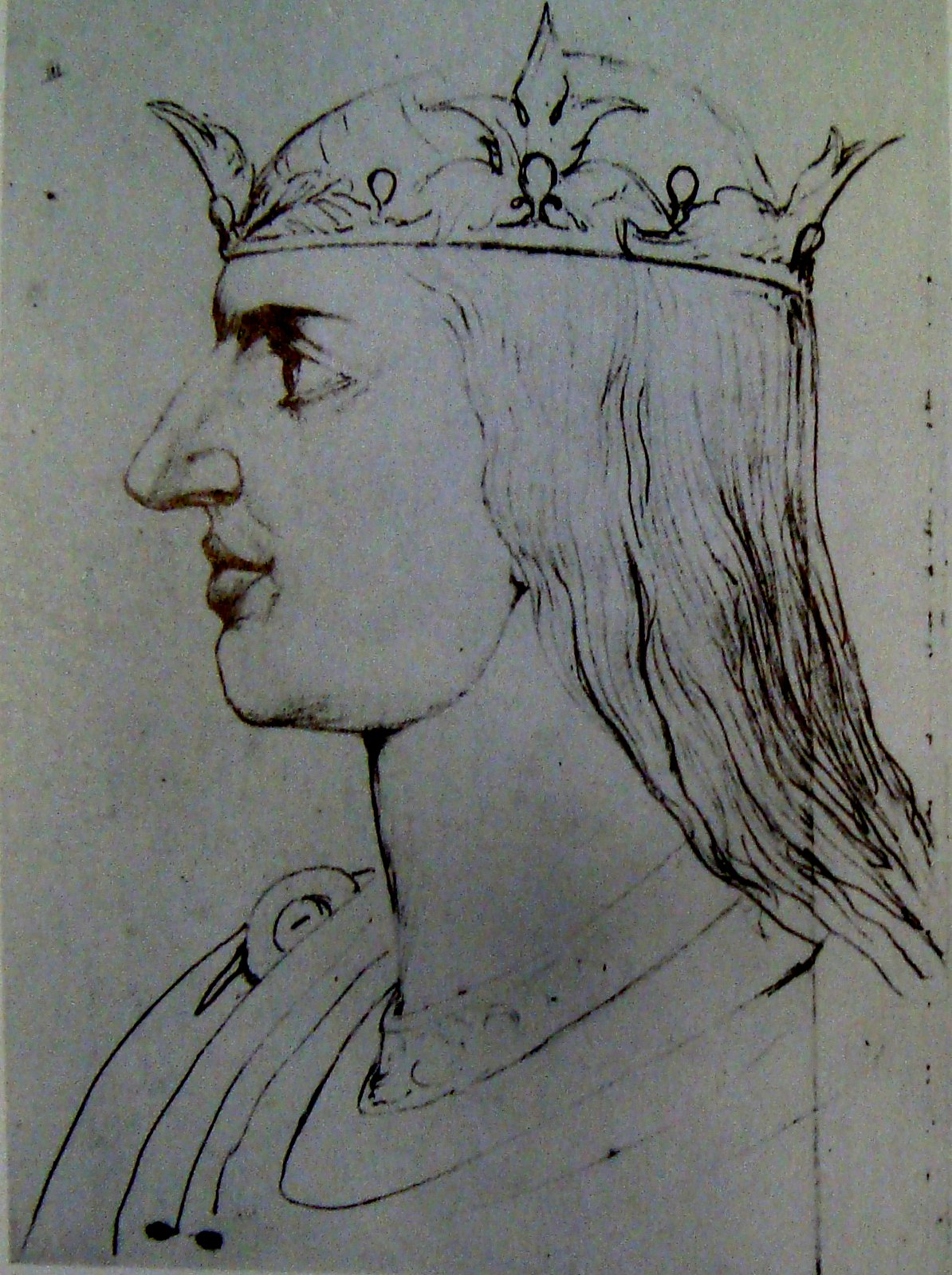
An Anglo-Norman King, Butlin #724 c 1819-20 281x213mm - F Bailey Vanderhoef Jr - Ojai California

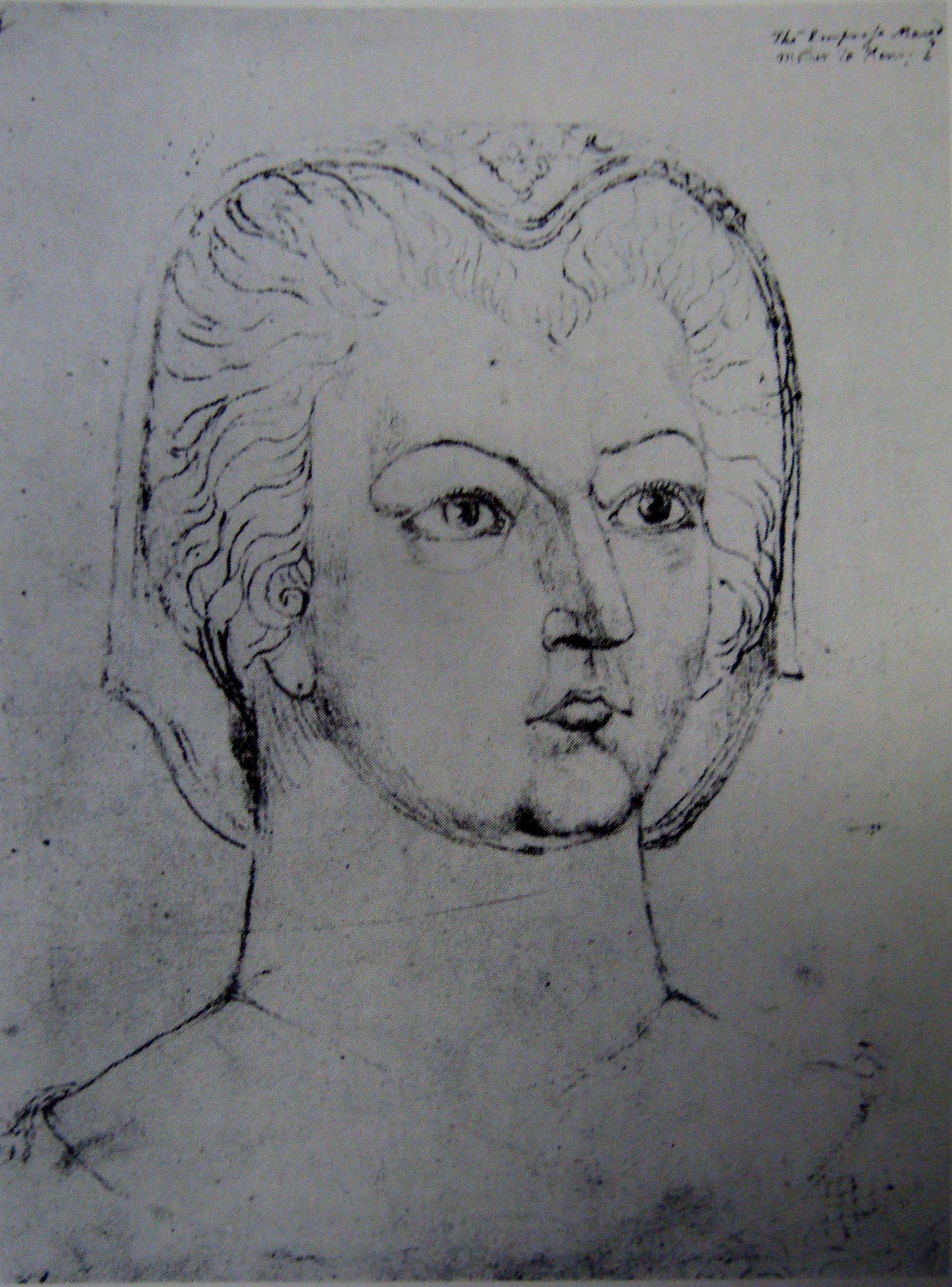
Empress Maud, Butlin #725 c 1819-20 250x182mm - F Bailey Vanderhoef Jr - Ojai California

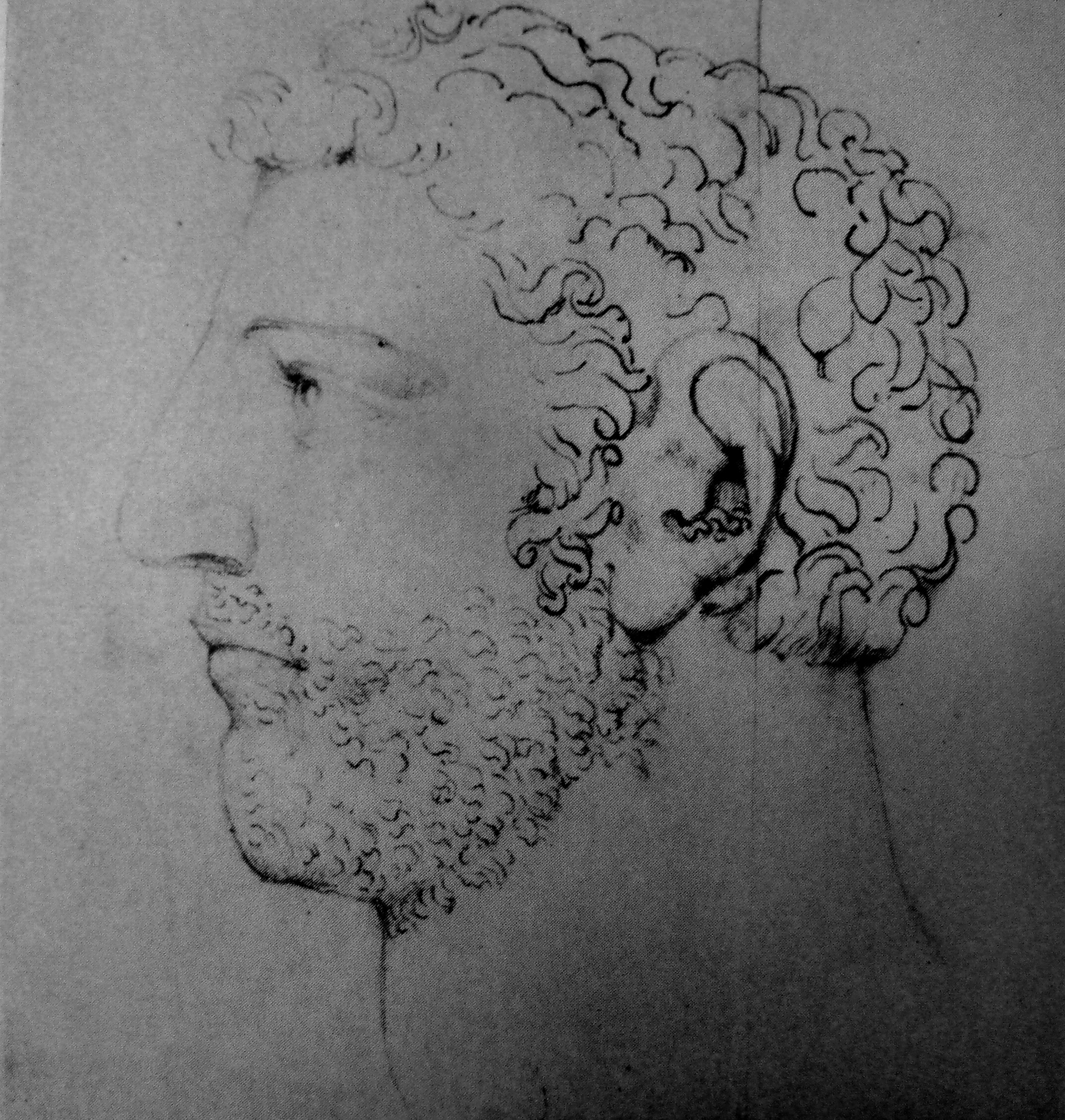
Richard Coer de Lion, Butlin #729 c 1819 178x163mm - Joseph Holland - Los Angeles, California

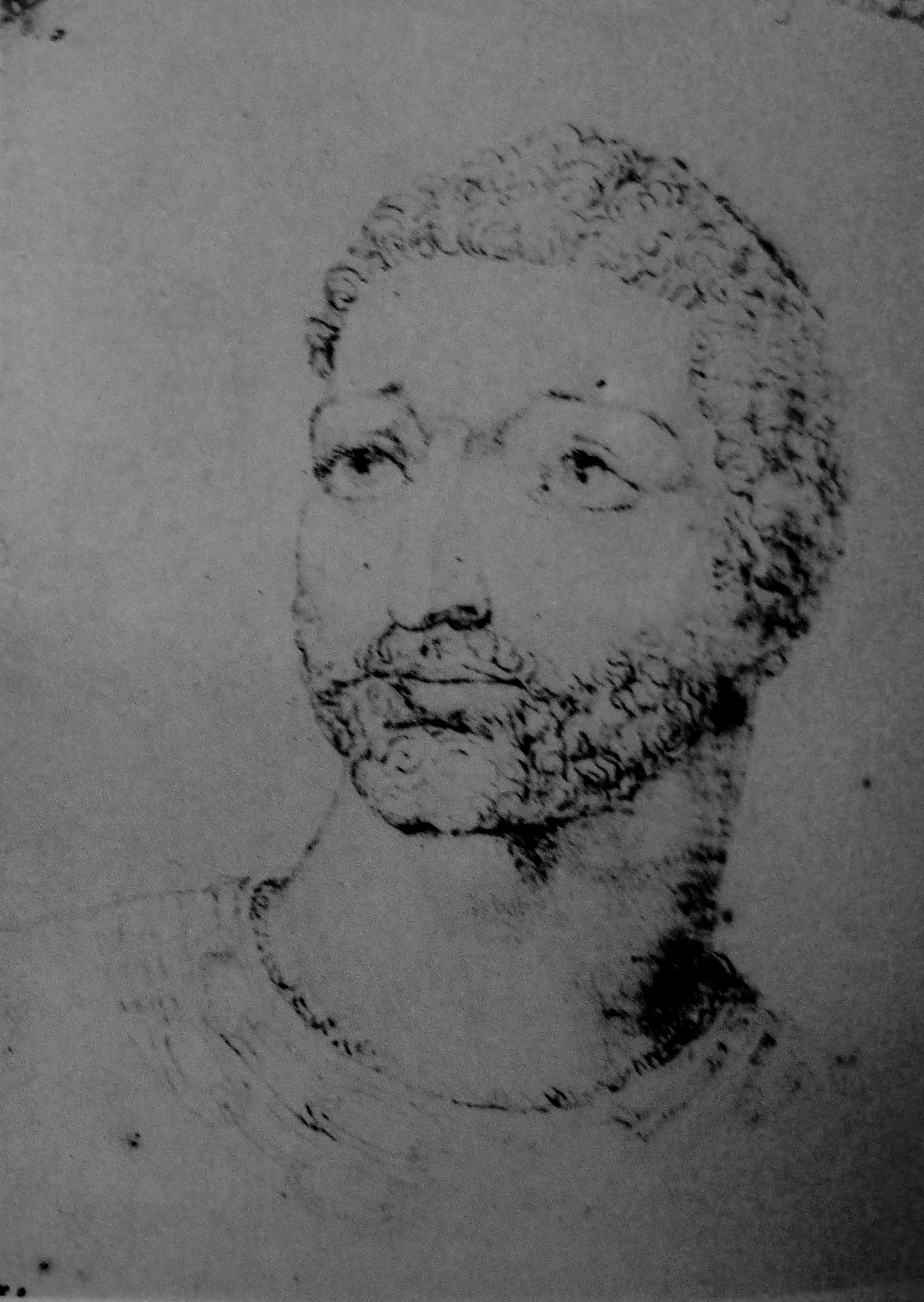
Faulconberg the Bastard, Butlin #730 c 1819-20 249x183mm - Huntington Library and Art Gallery, San Marino, California

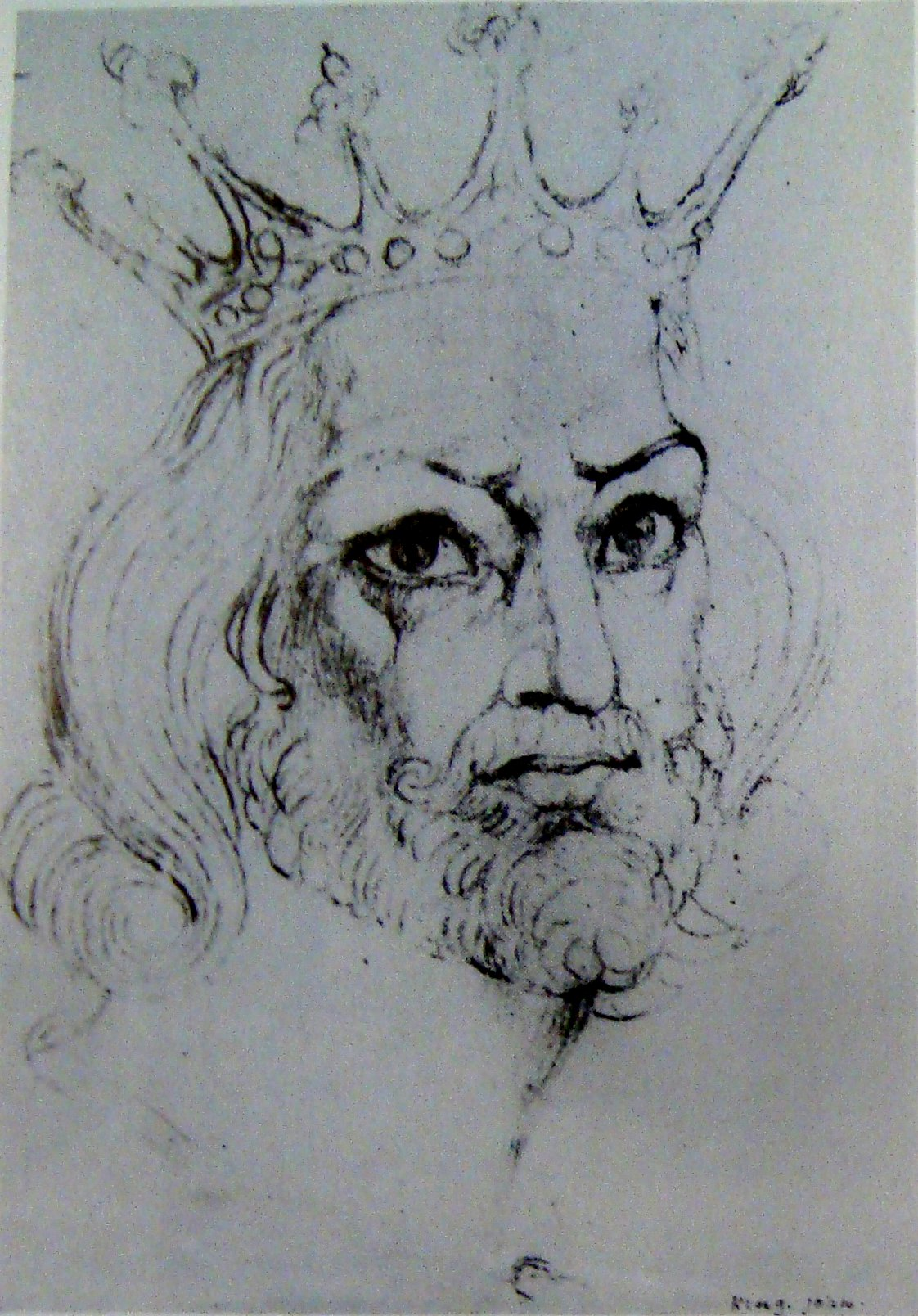
King John, Butlin #731 c 1819-20 248x170mm - F Bailey Vanderhoef Jr - Ojai California

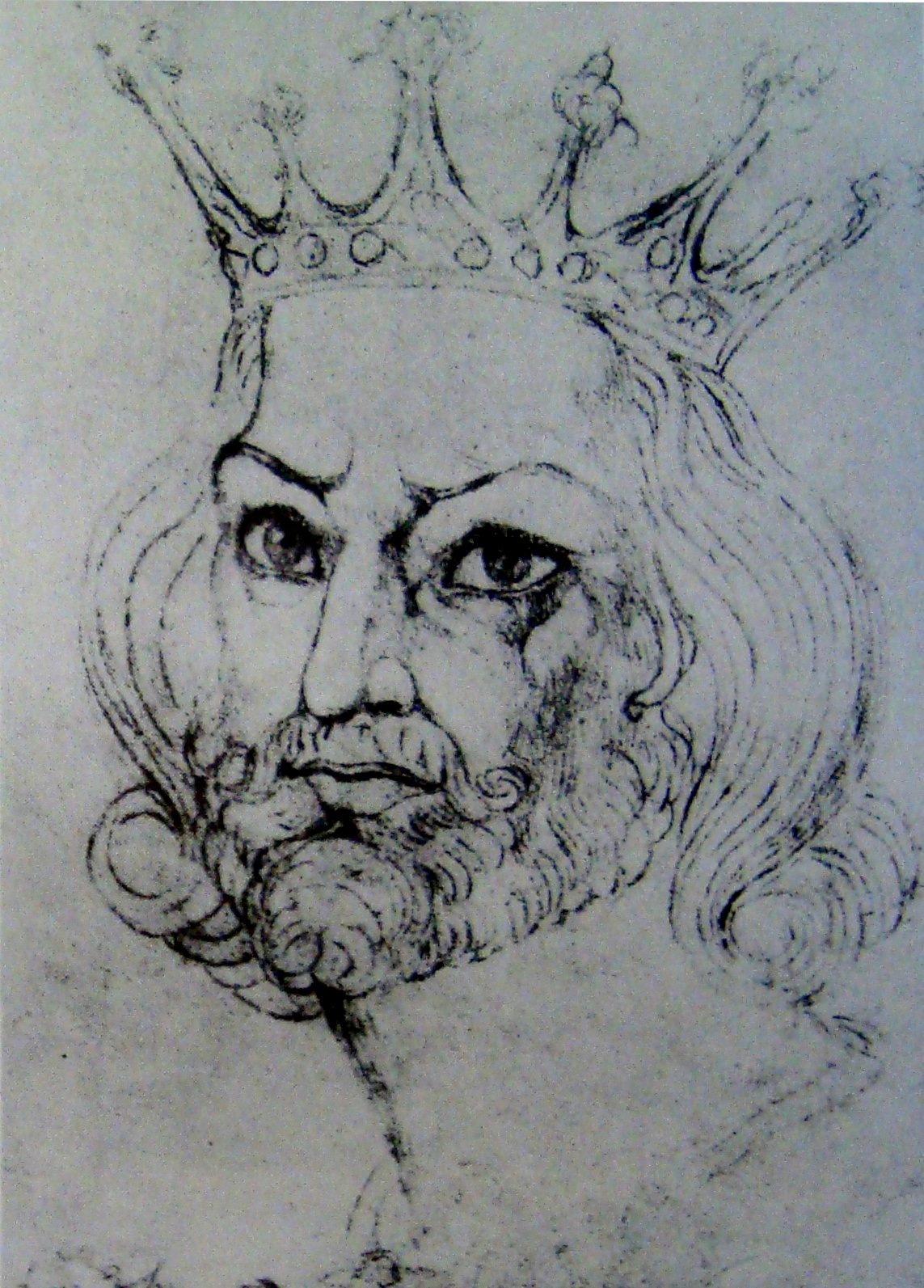
King John - Counterproof - Butlin #732 240x190mm Private - Stamford, Connecticut

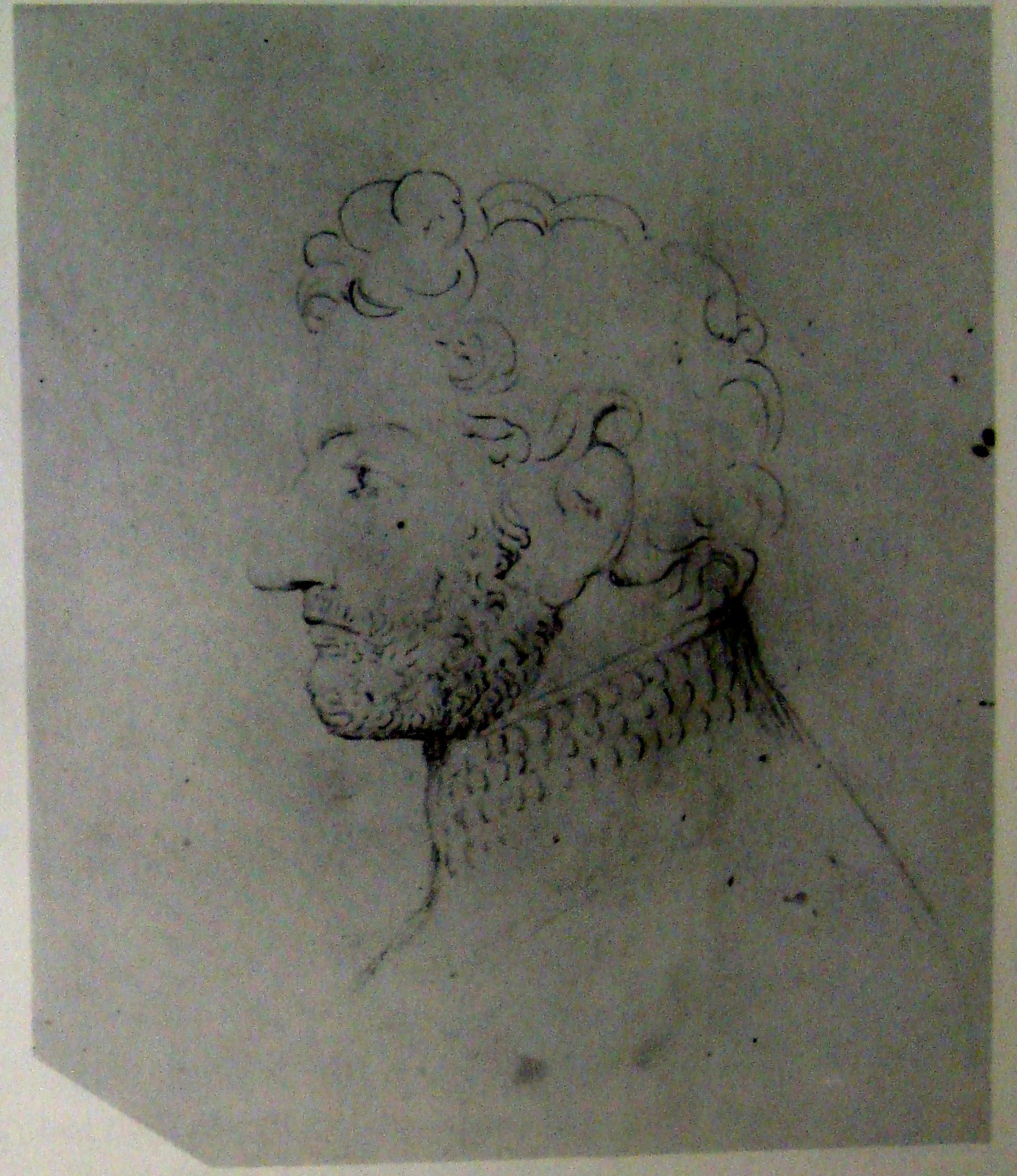
Edward III, 736 c 1819–20, 180x140mm – Private Collection, New York

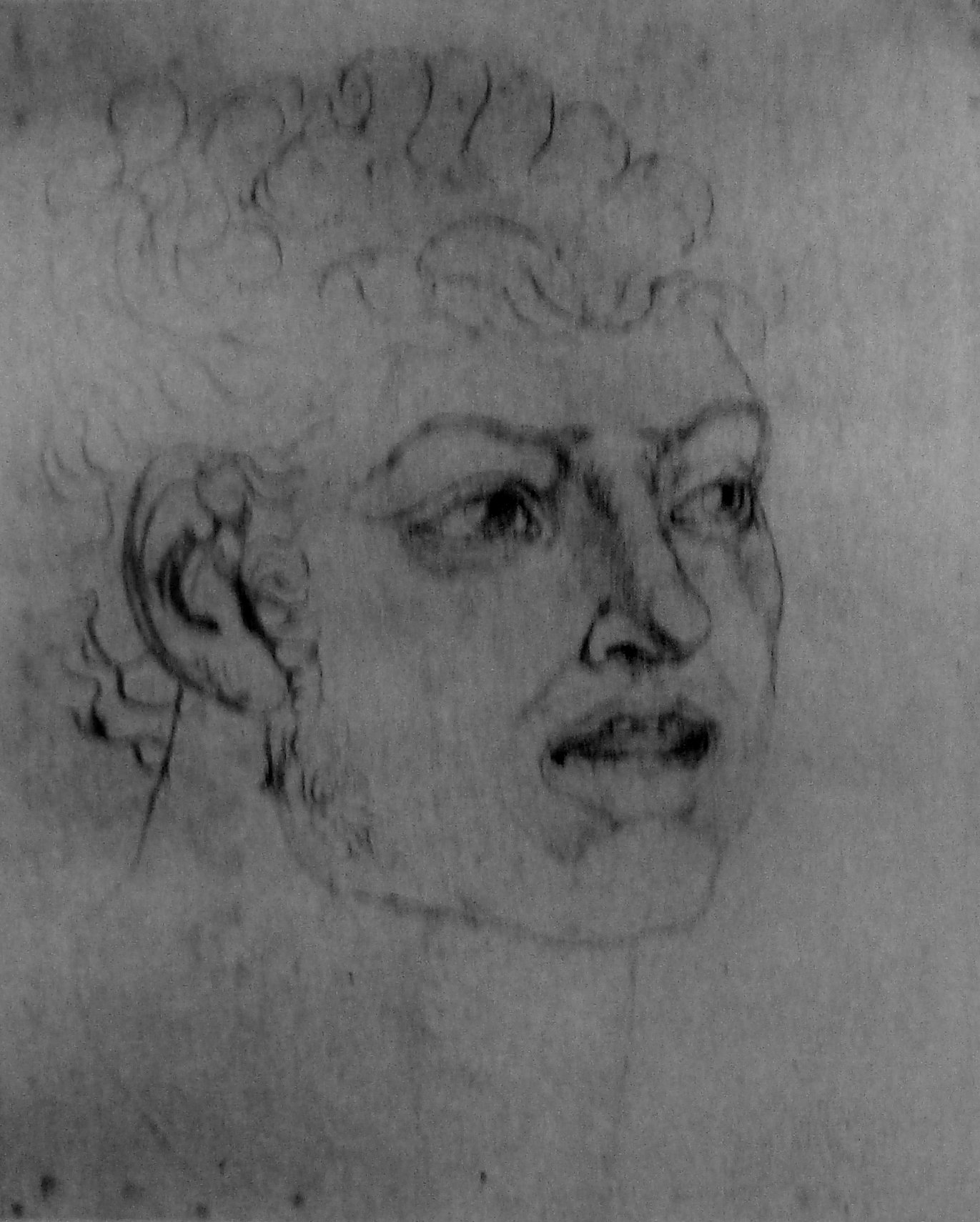
Wat Tyler, Butlin #737, c1819, 242x103mm - Edwin Wolf 2nd, Philadelphia

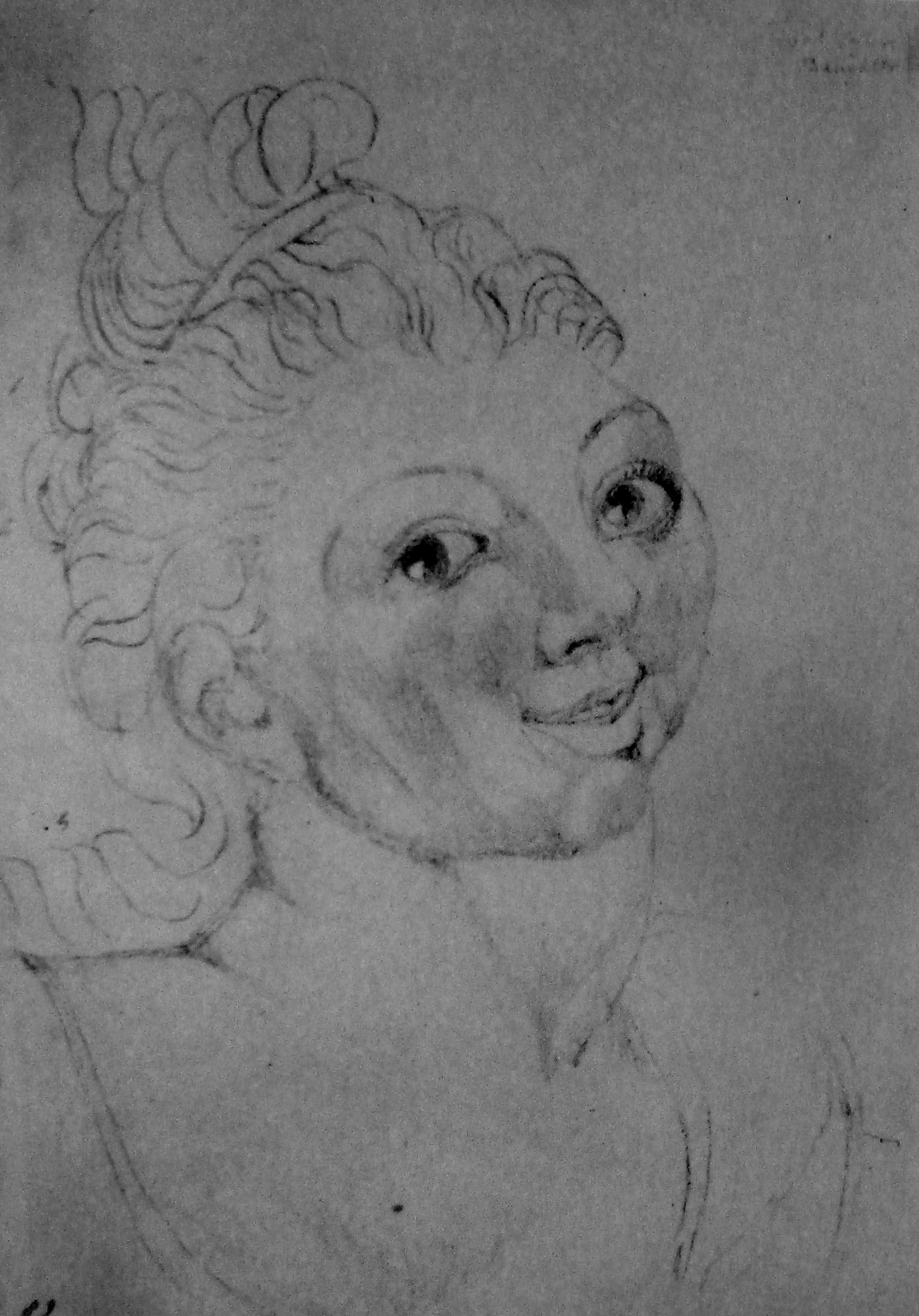
Wat Tyler's Daughter, Butlin #741 c 1819-20 253x188mm – National Gallery of Art, Washington, DC

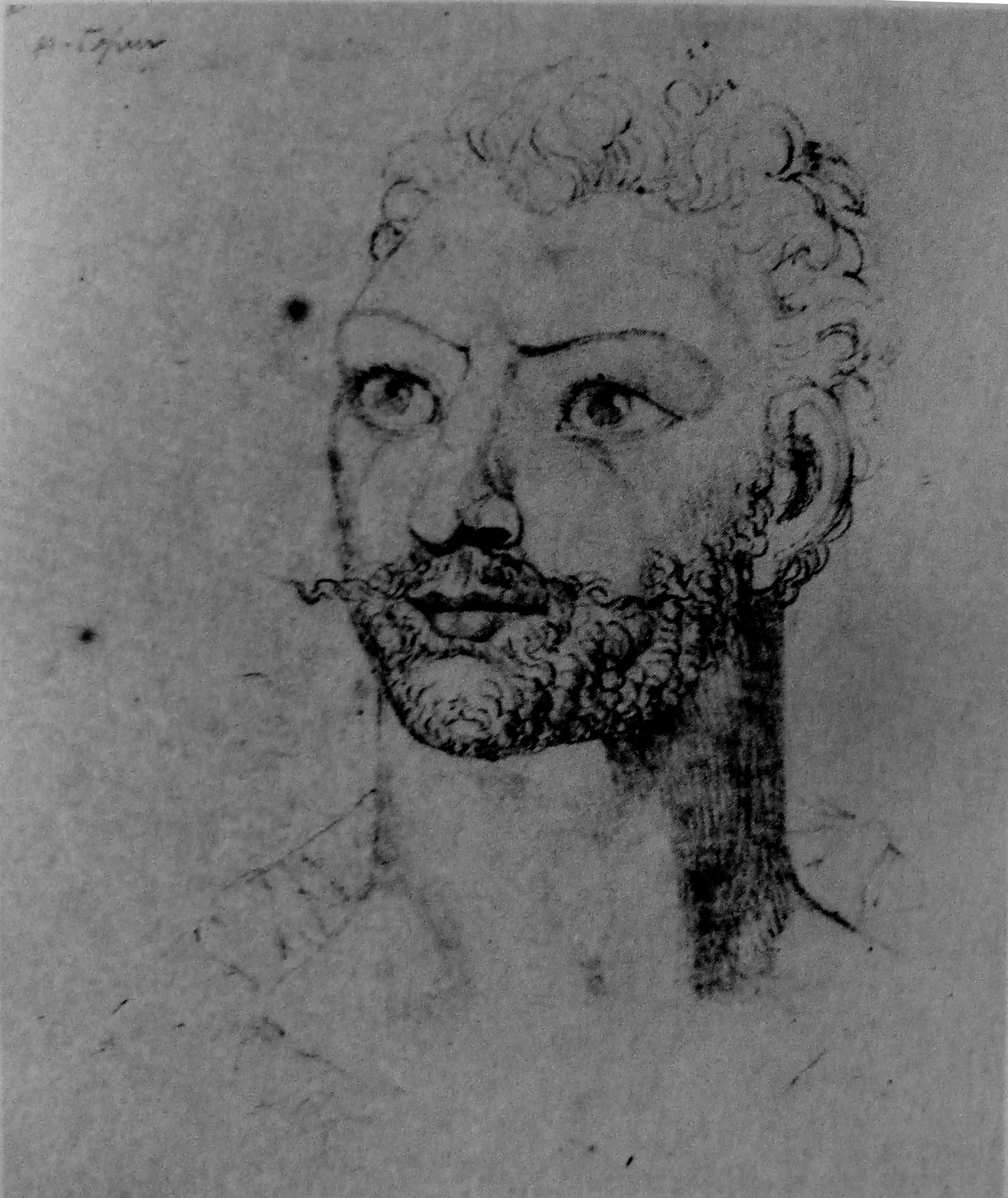
Hotspur, Butlin #745 c 1819-20 322x178mm - F Bailey Vanderhoef Jr - Ojai California.jpg

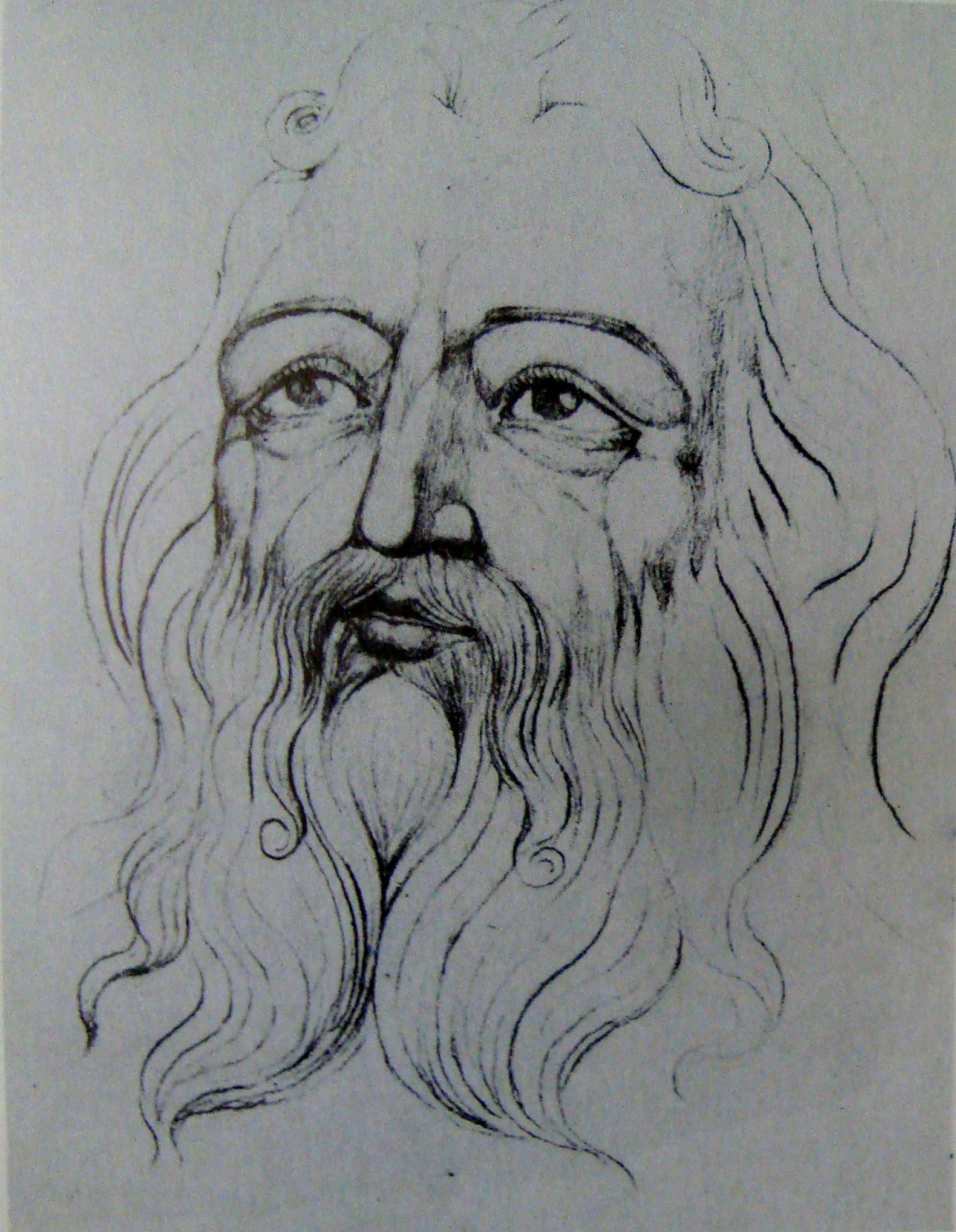
Weish Bard, Job or Moses, Butlin #757 c 1819-20 246x188mm - F Bailey Vanderhoef Jr - Ojai California

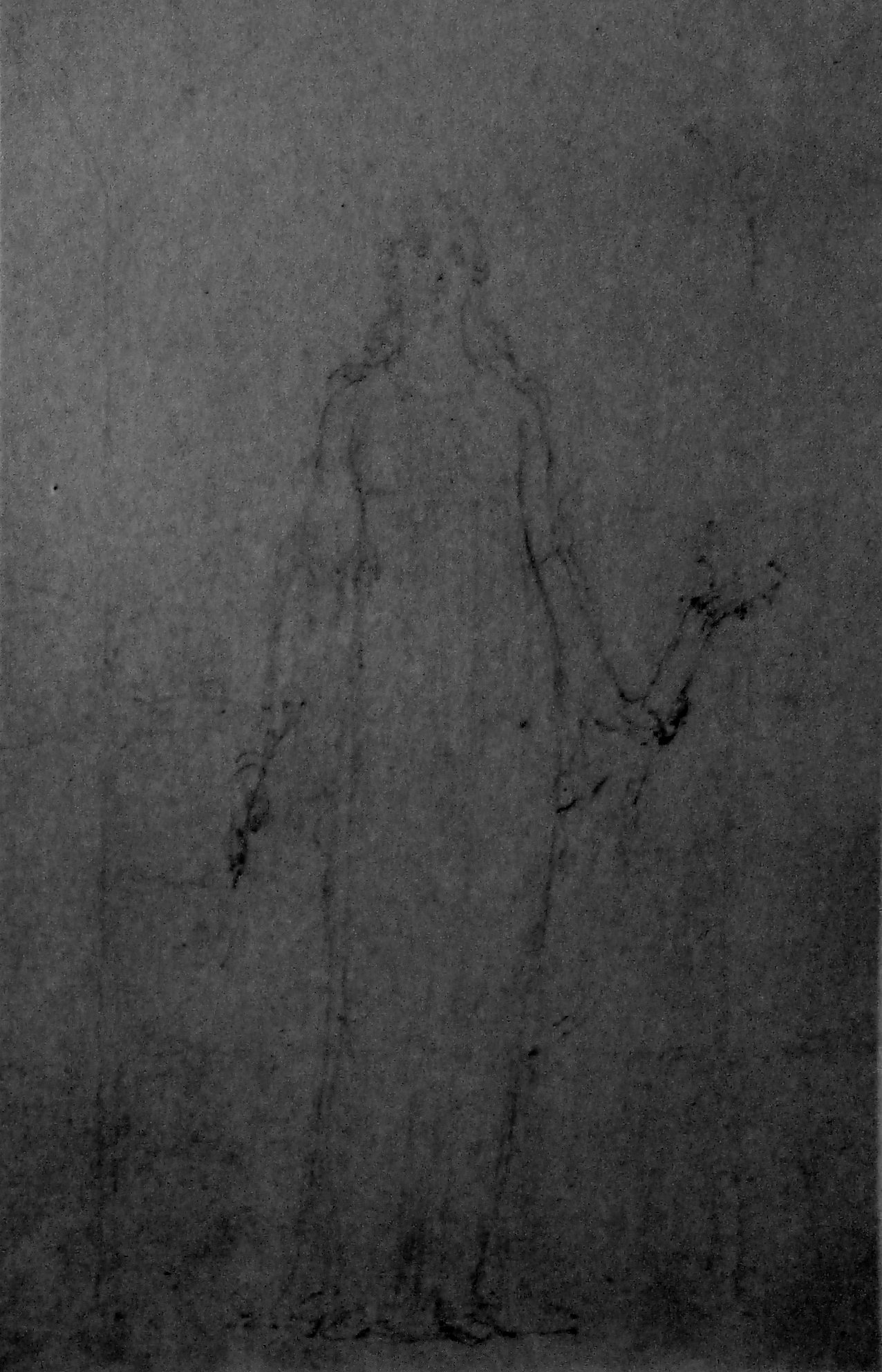
The Lute Player, Butlin #760 recto, c1819-20, 195x120mm - Untraced since 1959

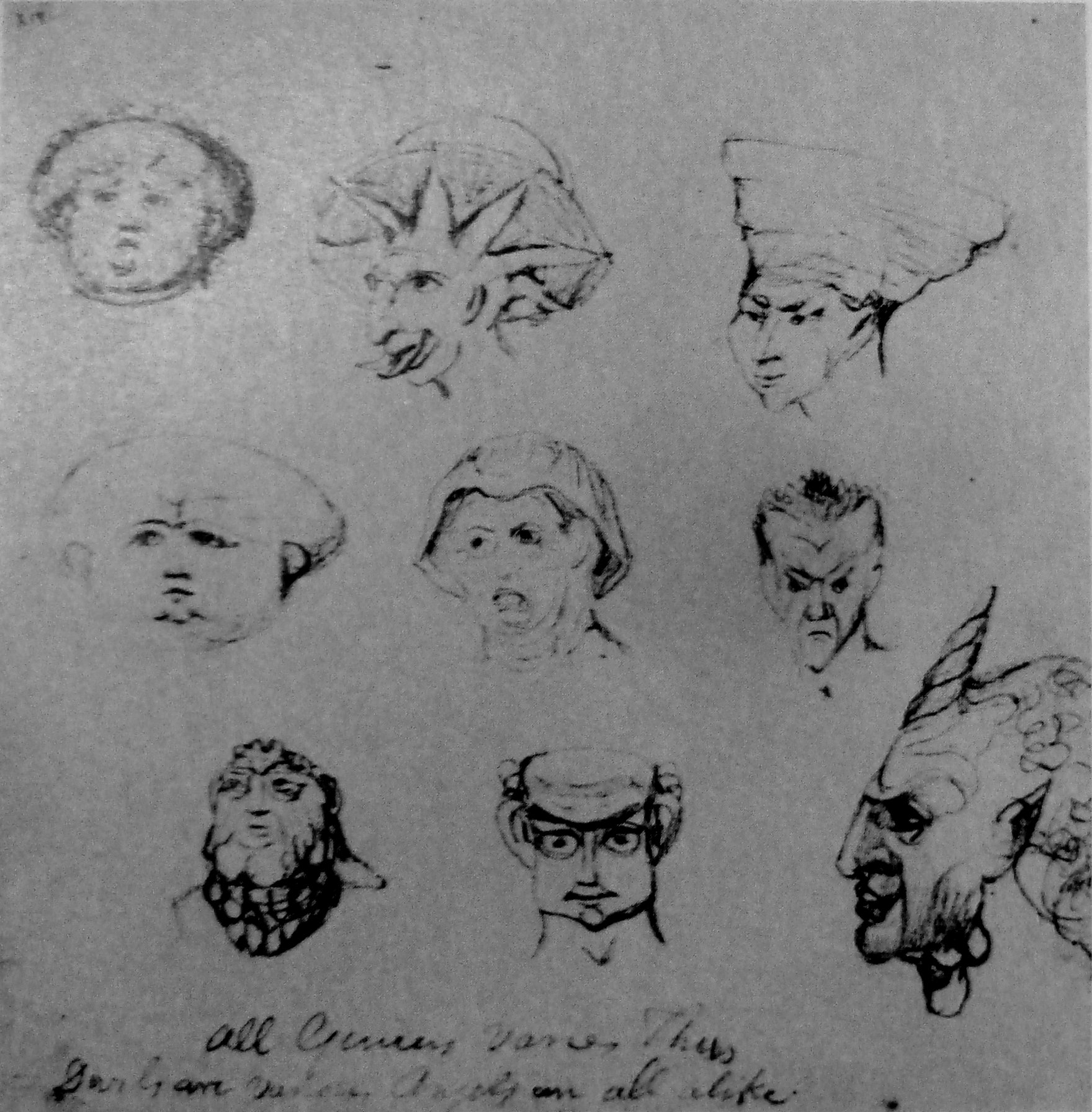
9 Grotesque or Demoniac Heads, Butlin #767 recto c 1819-20 183x188mm - F Bailey Vanderhoef Jr - Ojai California

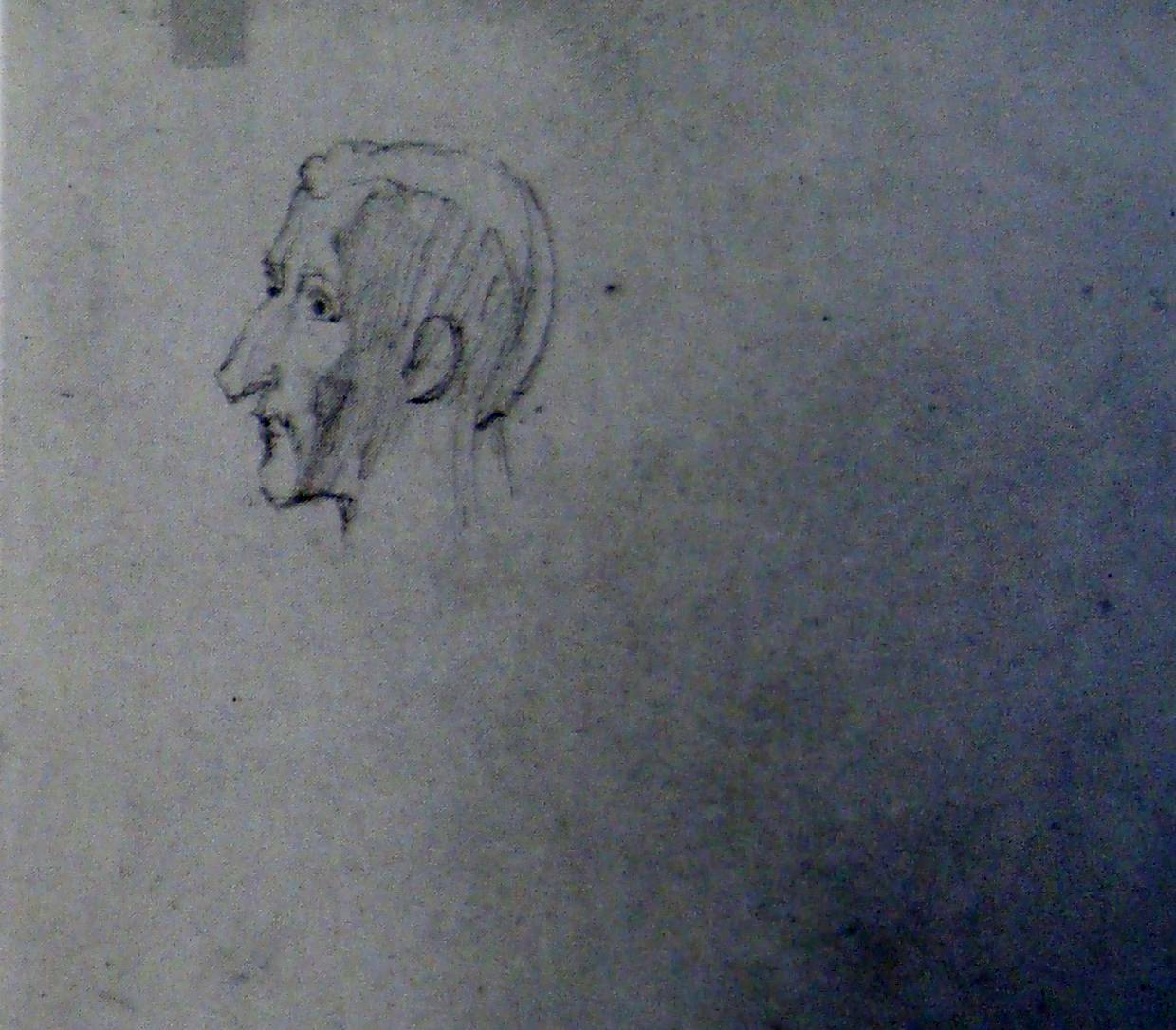
A Head, Butlin #767 verso c 1819-20 183x188mm - F Bailey Vanderhoef Jr - Ojai California

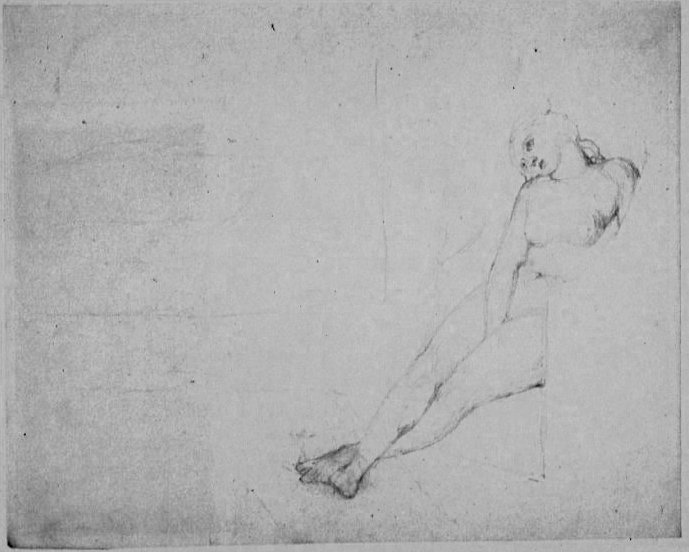
A Seated Nude Woman by a Window, Butlin #768 recto, c1820-25, 181x227mm - British Museum

== See also ==
- The Ghost of a Flea

== Bibliography ==
- A Treatise on Zodiacal Physiognomy, illustrated by engravings of heads and features, and accompanied by tables of the time of rising of the twelve signs of the zodiac; and containing also new and astrological explanations of some remarkable portions of ancient mythological history (published for the author, 10 1/2, Great Tichfield Street, London 1928; sold by Longman) IV, 60pp.: 6 Plates, (8vo), 25 cm; plates engraved by J. Linnell.
- Bentley, Jr, G. E.. Blake Records. Second Edition. New Haven and London: Yale University Press, 2004. Pp. xxxviii+943. Illus. ISBN 0-300-09685-2 (BR2)
- Bentley, Jr, G. E.. Blake's Visionary Heads: Lost Drawings and a Lost Book, in Romanticism and Millenarianism, ed. Tim Fulford (New York: Palgrave, 2002): 183–205. ISBN 0-312-24011-2
- Bentley, Jr, G. E.. The Stranger from Paradise: A Biography of William Blake, Yale University Press, New Haven & London, 2003 ISBN 0-300-10030-2
- Butlin, Martin (ed., and Introduction and Notes). The Blake-Varley Sketchbook of 1819 in the Collection of M. D. E. Clayton-Stamm. [2 vols.]. London: Heinemann, 1969. ISBN 978-0434099306.
- Keynes, Sir Geoffry (ed. incl. Introduction and Commentary). Drawings of William Blake: 92 Pencil Studies. Dover Publications, Inc., New York, 1970 ISBN 0-486-22303-5
- Raine, Kathleen. William Blake, The World of Art Library - Artists, Arts Book Society, Thames and Hudson, London, 1970 (216 pp, 156 illustrations) ISBN 0-500-20107-2

== Visionary Heads in music ==
- Visionary Heads, five pieces for piano after pictures by William Blake Op. 172 (2013) written by Russian/British composer Dmitri N. Smirnov → YouTube
