= Bathsheba at Her Bath (Hayez) =

1834 painting by Francesco Hayez

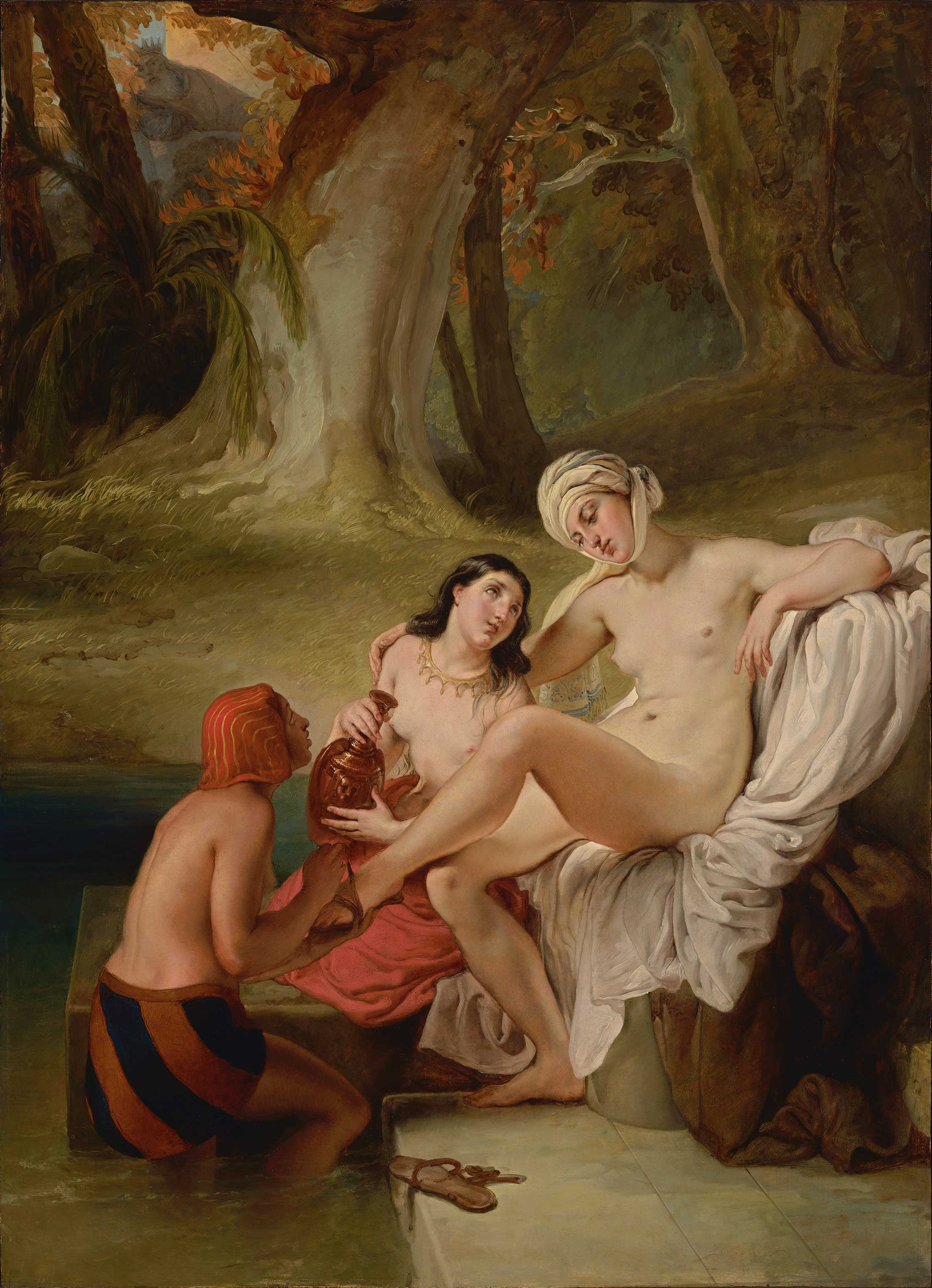
- Artist: Francesco Hayez
- Year: 1834
- Type: Oil on panel, religious art
- Dimensions: 107 cm × 77 cm (42 in × 30 in)
- Location: Pinacoteca di Brera; Milan

Bathsheba at Her Bath (Italian: Betsabea al bagno) is an 1834 history painting by the Italian artist Francesco Hayez. It depicts the biblical story of Bathsheba who is spied bathing by the Israelite king David her future husband. It was a popular theme for artists from the Renaissance era onwards. Hayez painted the scene in the style of the ascendant romanticism of the 1830s. He had earlier produced a painting of Bathsheba for William I of Württemberg featuring a very different composition.

While the original 1834 version of the work is now in a private collection, a second produced in 1845 is now in the collection of the Pinacoteca di Brera in Milan.

== Bibliography ==
- Bietoletti, Silvestra. Neoclassicism and Romanticism. Sterling Publishing Company, 2009.
- Jones, Tom Devonshire, Murray, Linda & Murray, Peter. The Oxford Dictionary of Christian Art and Architecture. OUP Oxford, 2013.
- Mazzocca, Fernando . Francesco Hayez: catalogo ragionato. F. Motta, 1994.
