= Bathsheba at Her Bath (Rembrandt) =

Oil painting by Rembrandt

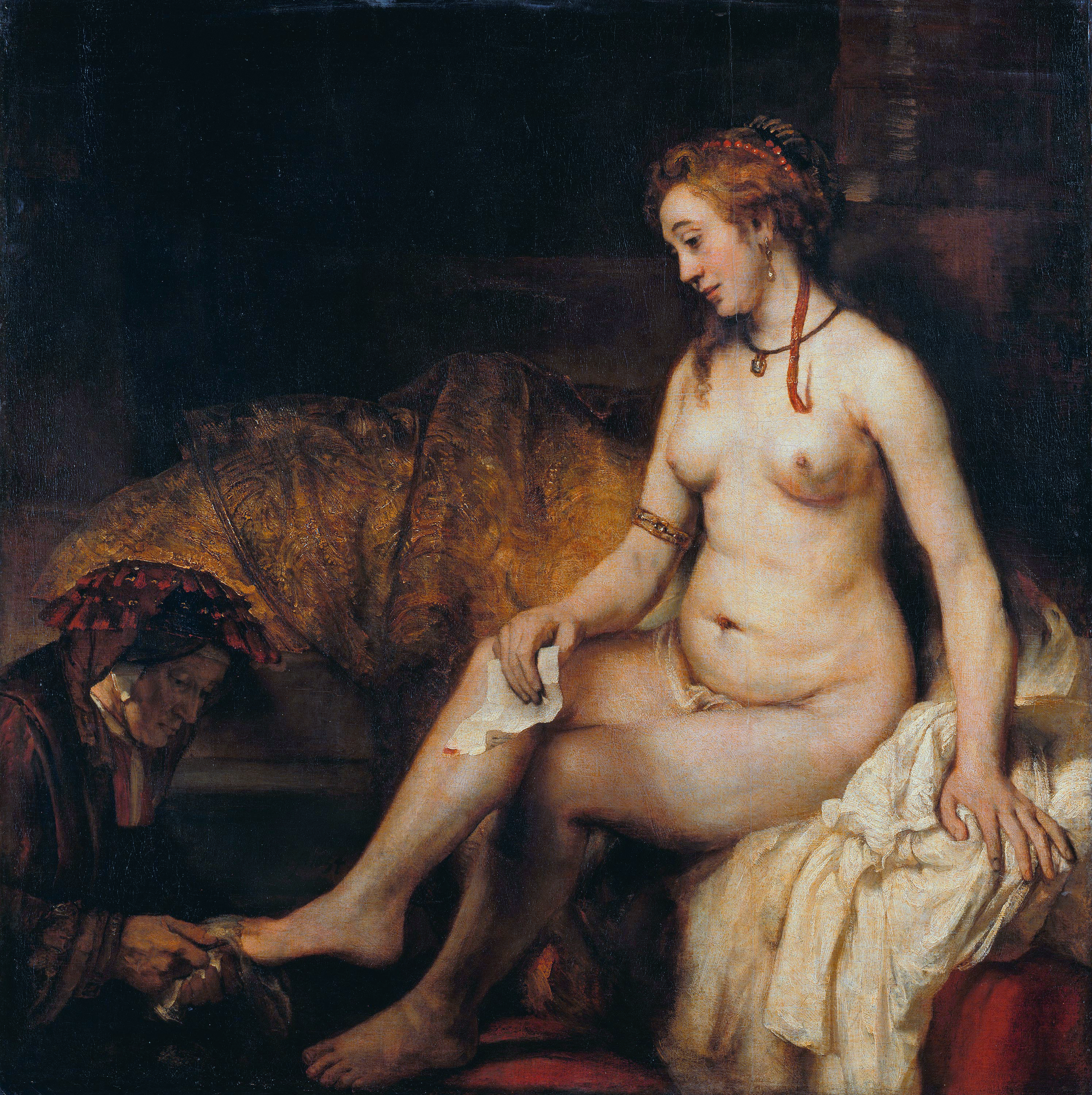
- Artist: Rembrandt
- Year: 1654
- Medium: Oil on canvas
- Dimensions: 142 cm × 142 cm (56 in × 56 in)
- Location: The Louvre, Paris

Bathsheba at Her Bath (or Bathsheba with King David's Letter) is an oil painting by the Dutch artist Rembrandt (1606–1669), finished in 1654.

A depiction that is both sensual and empathetic, it shows a moment from the Old Testament story related in 2 Samuel 11 in which King David sees Bathsheba bathing and, entranced, impregnates her. In order to marry Bathsheba and conceal his sin, David sends her husband into battle and orders his generals to abandon him, leaving him to certain death.

While the scene of David spying on Bathsheba had been painted by earlier artists, Rembrandt's depiction differs in its tight pictorial focus and erotic vitality, achieved through broad, thick brushstrokes and vibrant coloration.

The painting hangs in The Louvre; it is one of 583 works donated by Dr. Louis La Caze in 1869. For Kenneth Clark, the canvas is "Rembrandt's greatest painting of the nude". Its insight into Bathsheba's moral dilemma has been described as "one of the great achievements of western painting."

== Biblical account and variation ==
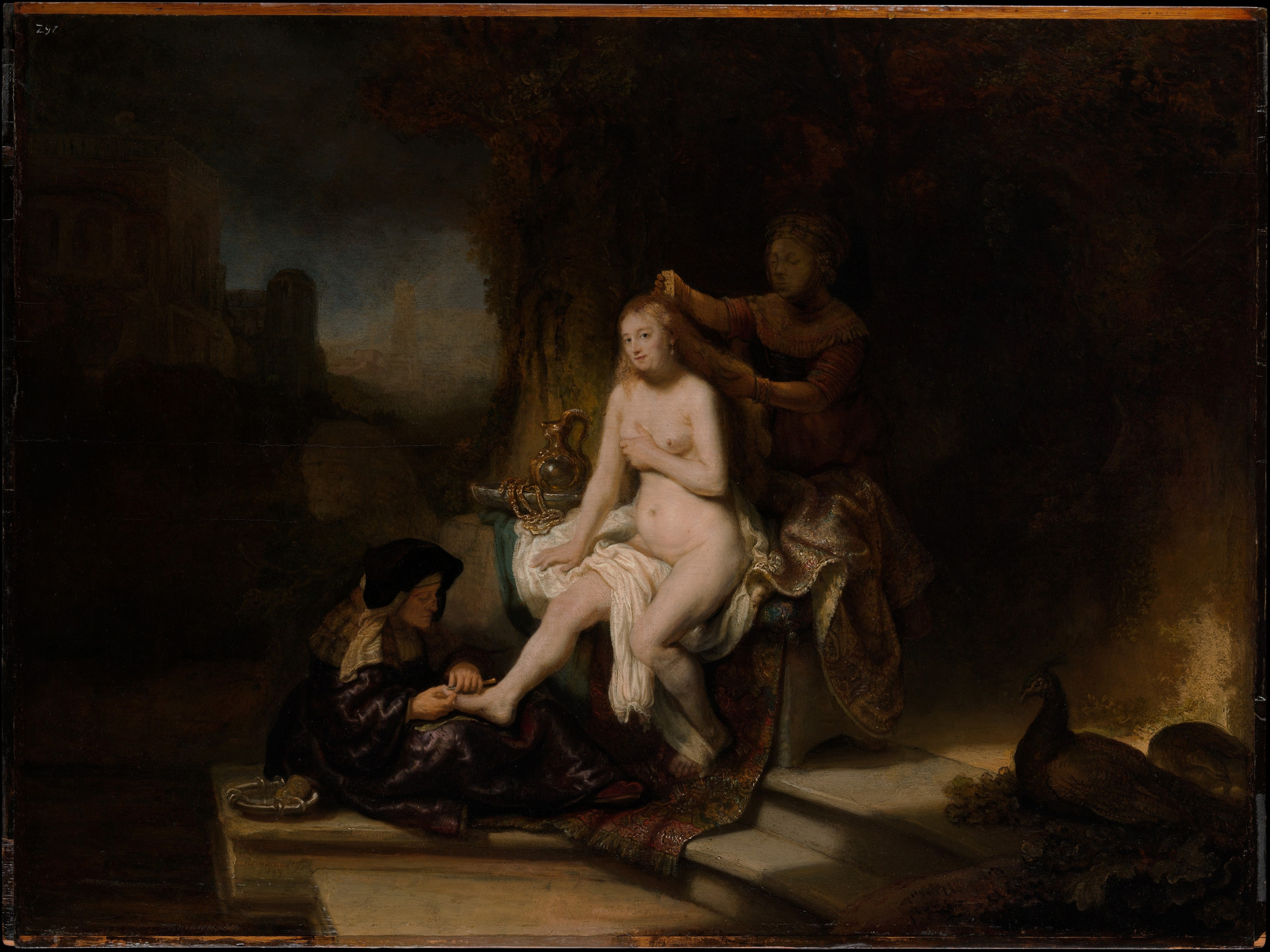
Rembrandt, The Toilet of Bathsheba, 1643, Metropolitan Museum of Art

The Second Book of Samuel (11:2-4) gives the account of King David who saw a woman bathing from his palace roof. When he asked after her, he was told that she was Bathsheba, daughter of Eliam and wife of Uriah the Hittite. David had his messengers retrieve her, and after they slept together she became pregnant with his child. David was able to marry Bathsheba by sending Uriah into battle where he was killed.

Prior to Bathsheba at Her Bath, the standard treatment had been to show Bathsheba bathing out of doors—thus accounting for her visibility to David—and accompanied by maidservants. A tower could usually be seen in the distance, and perhaps a small figure of David, sometimes accompanied by his two courtiers. Such was the design Rembrandt's earlier The Toilet of Bathsheba, dated 1643. By eliminating David, his messengers and most of the traditional narrative elements from the picture—the only anecdotal references included are the letter from David (not actually mentioned in Samuel) and the presence of an attendant drying her foot—Rembrandt's presentation of Bathsheba is both intimate and monumental. As a result, the moralistic theme of previous treatments of the subject is replaced by a direct eroticism in which the viewer supplants David as voyeur.

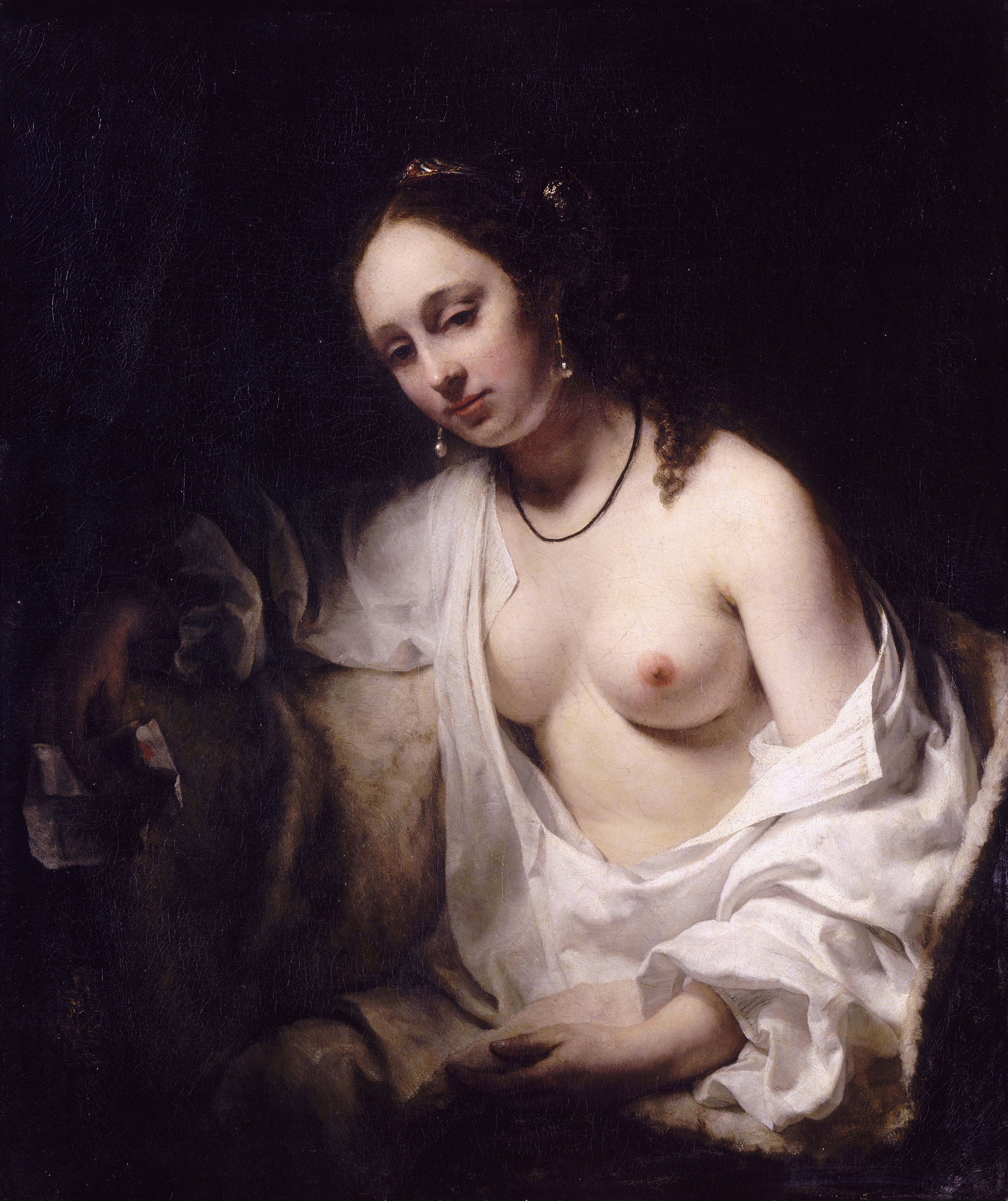
Willem Drost, Bathsheba with David's Letter, 1654

The work is painted as life sized and in a shallow space, with Bathsheba dominating the composition as she had in no other earlier version of the scene. It is not known whether Rembrandt painted Bathsheba for his own reasons, or to satisfy a commission. Presumably in response to Rembrandt's painting, his ex-pupil and close associate Willem Drost painted Bathsheba with David's Letter the same year, which is also in the Louvre.

== Composition ==
Apart from the lack of anecdotal devices, the painting is unusual in other ways. Bathsheba is presented in a space that is difficult to read. The dark background is suggestive of night, while a massive column implies a large architectural structure. Behind her lies a passage of richly painted drapery composed of browns and ochers that impart a golden warmth. Around her rests a thickly painted background of white chemise; set against this her naked flesh stands out for its solid form and the sumptuous application of paint. The paint used to describe her figure is richly nuanced, its broad brushstrokes and strong highlights impart a vibrant tactile quality to the body, rendering her presence palpable.

Bathsheba at Her Bath is a reinterpretation of two antique reliefs familiar to Rembrandt through engravings. A print by Tobias Stimmer may have been influential, as it includes the pillar, a curtain drawn across the background and Bathsheba's downcast gaze. It was begun around 1647 and altered and repainted until its completion in 1654. Originally the canvas may have been larger and of a vertical format. It might have been trimmed some ten centimeters at the left and at least 20 centimeters in height; It is speculated that Rembrandt cut the canvas himself in order to intensify the impact of the figure. X-radiographs show that at some point late in the painting process, he lowered Bathsheba's head from its initial more upward angle, thereby increasing the sense of the figure's withdrawal into reverie. Initially she appeared to be looking out of the corner of her eye, as if watching David; in the present version her gaze is softened, in the general direction of her maid but focused on no particular object, imparting a feeling of solemnity and contemplation. There was no letter in her hand in the original conception, and it is also possible that her lap, thighs, and right arm were once draped.

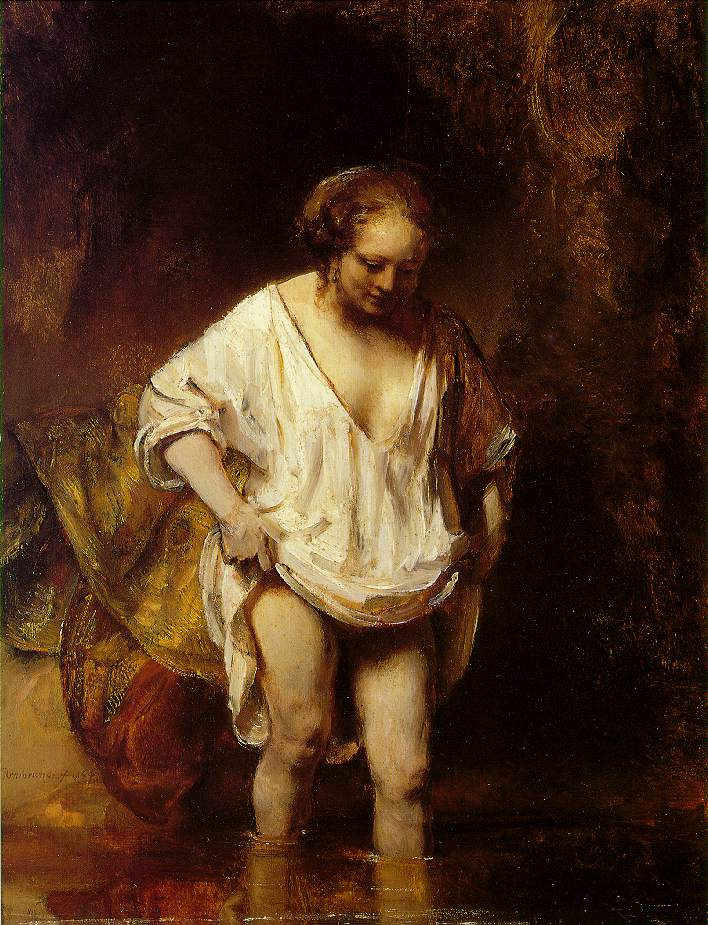
A Woman Bathing in a Stream, 1655, National Gallery, London, was painted by Rembrandt at about the same time as Bathsheba and shares a similar spirit of intimacy.

Despite its classical references, the characterization of the figure is unconventional, and the depictions of her large stomach, hands and feet are derived from observation rather than respect for the idealised form. Alternatively, art historian Eric Jan Sluijter proposed that the figure could not have been painted directly from a posed model, given the anatomical discrepancies (an impossibly twisted left arm, the length of the right arm, an unnatural twist of the torso, and the elongated distance from breast to groin) and inconsistencies in perspective that indicate different parts of the figure are viewed from various vantage points. Yet, the figure appears to repose naturally, without tension or movement. Whatever physical awkwardness the figure may possess when compared to classical sources, the truthfulness of her image has been seen as extraordinarily noble; according to Clark, "this Christian acceptance of the unfortunate body has permitted the Christian privilege of a soul".

The letter shown in her right hand contains a demand from David for her to choose between fidelity to her husband or obedience to her king, and is an anecdotal catalyst for her introspection. In representing this moment, Rembrandt extrapolated from the biblical text, which treated Bathsheba incidentally while focusing on David's sinfulness. As a result, her expression is profound enough to suggest not only her sense of resignation, but the broader narrative as well. As a conception of the nude figure suffused with complexity of thought, Bathsheba at Her Bath is nearly unique in art.

== Model ==
The traditionally accepted identification of the model is of Rembrandt's partner Hendrickje Stoffels, who would have been 28 at the time of the painting. Sluijter has proposed otherwise, stating that the likeness is of an ideal type used by Rembrandt over a long period. Assuming Stoffels as the model, medical researchers have observed deformity in the left breast, and have offered various hypotheses including breast cancer, abscess due to tuberculosis and lactation mastitis following an unsuccessful pregnancy. The diagnosis of breast cancer is unlikely, given that Stoffels lived for another nine years.

In "The medical enigma of Rembrandt's Bathsheba", Paolo Zamboni, a professor of vascular surgery at the University of Ferrara, claims to have solved the mystery of the model's breast. According to Zamboni the model was affected by thrombophlebitis of a superficial vein of the breast, a condition described by Mondor in 1939. Zamboni bases his claim on the similar appearance of the right breast of one of his own patients whose thrombophlebitis was confirmed by ultrasound, and whose mammography was negative for both cancer and mastitis.

The look of sorrow in the subject's face has been interpreted as evidence of Stoffels' illness and pregnancy (she gave birth to a daughter in October 1654), Rembrandt's difficulties with the Church stemming from his cohabitation with Stoffels, and the artist's impending bankruptcy. An alternative hypothesis for the model's identity has suggested that Stoffels' head was placed on the body of another model, which is consistent with the result derived from x-rays that Bathsheba's head had been repainted.

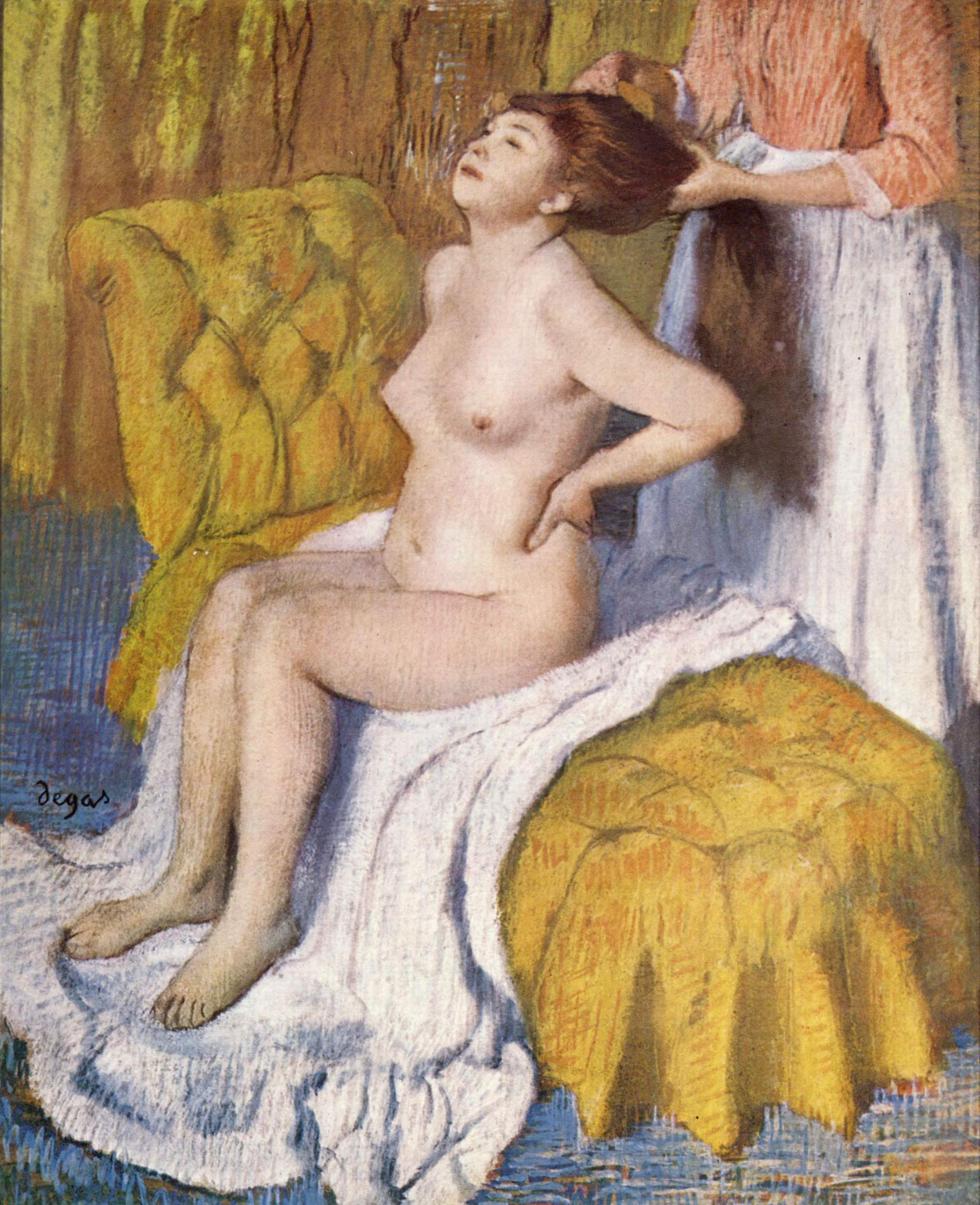
Edgar Degas, Woman Having her Hair Combed, c. 1885, is reminiscent of Rembrandt's painting.

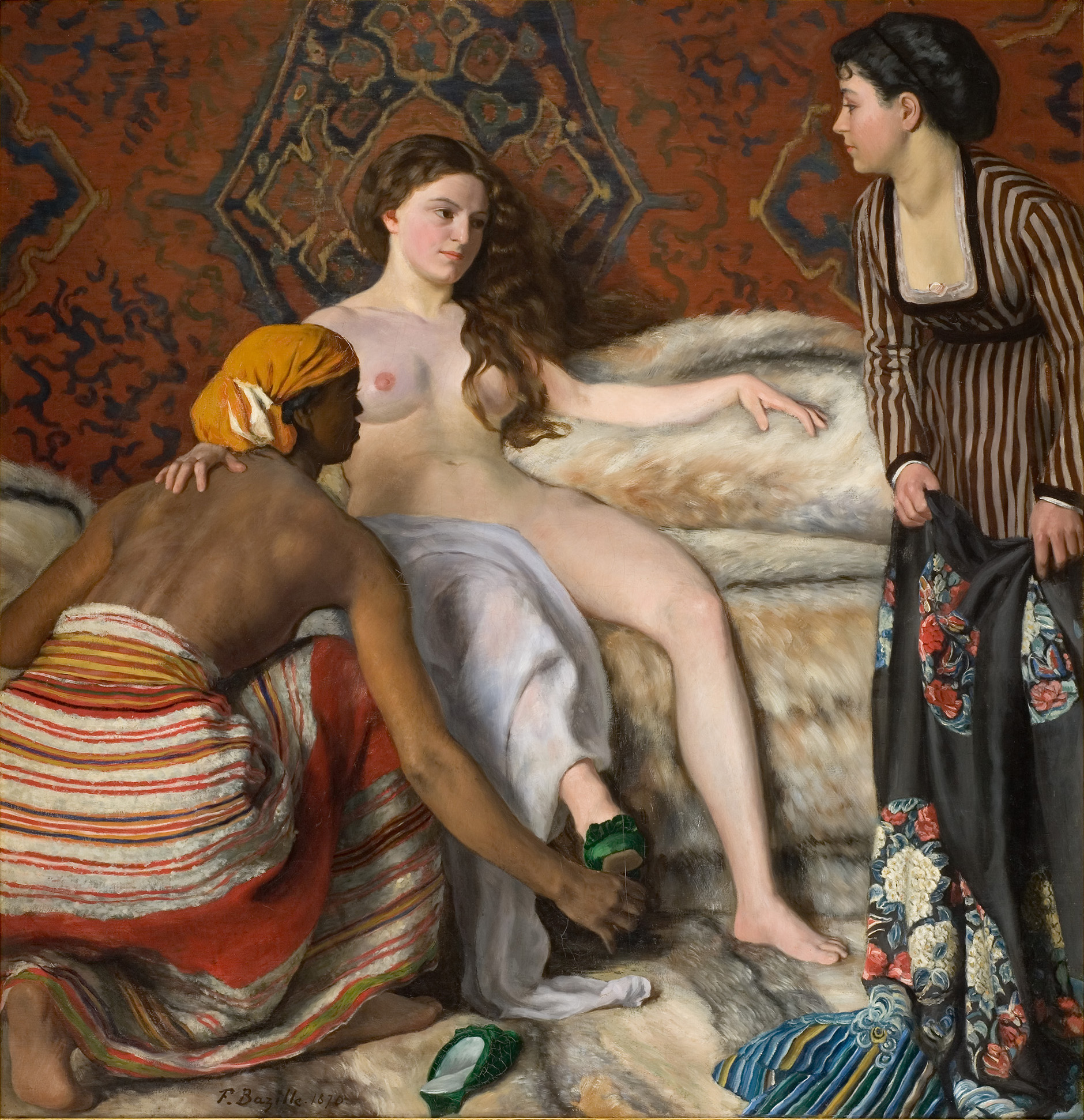
Frédéric Bazille, La Toilette, 1870

== Artistic responses ==
Allusions to Bathsheba at Her Bath have been noted in the works of 19th- and 20th-century artists. It is thought to have inspired The Surprised Nymph (1859–61), an early figure by Édouard Manet that playfully references old master sources. Edgar Degas' pastel Woman Having Her Hair Combed (c. 1885) has been compared to Bathsheba for similarities in the model's attitude; Degas' father was an acquaintance of Louis La Caze, who owned Bathsheba prior to bequeathing it to the Louvre in 1869.

Frédéric Bazille recalled Bathsheba in his La Toilette, painted for the 1870 Paris Salon. Similar in size and format, Bazille's work shares some of the mood of the Rembrandt: according to critic Dianne Pitman, "not the unfolding of a specific narrative but the interplay of sensual effect and solemnity, blending realistic intimacy and dignified remoteness". A 1963 print by Picasso, Seated Nude and Another Figure, refers to the overtly voyeuristic properties of Bathsheba.

== In popular culture ==
The painting and its attempted theft forms the subject of "This One Goes to Eleven", a third-season episode of the Canadian television detective series Murdoch Mysteries.

The painting was depicted in the film Entrapment, where it was stolen from a penthouse by art thief Virginia "Gin" Baker (Catherine Zeta-Jones) who sends it down a mail chute to her buyer, but is stolen from the mailroom by another art thief, Robert "Mac" MacDougal (Sean Connery).

== See also ==
- List of paintings by Rembrandt
