= King David (film) =

1985 film by Bruce Beresford

- Original film poster
- Directed by: Bruce Beresford
- Screenplay by: Andrew Birkin; James Costigan
- Story by: James Costigan
- Based on: Old Testament (Books of Samuel, First Book of Chronicles, and Psalms of David)
- Produced by: Martin Elfand
- Starring: Richard Gere
- Cinematography: Donald McAlpine
- Edited by: William M. Anderson
- Music by: Carl Davis
- Distributed by: Paramount Pictures
- Release date: March 29, 1985
- Running time: 114 minutes
- Country: United States
- Language: English
- Budget: $21 million
- Box office: $5,111,099

King David is a 1985 American Biblical epic film about the life of David, the second King of the Kingdom of Israel, as recounted in the Hebrew Bible. The film is directed by Bruce Beresford, written by Andrew Birkin and James Costigan, and stars Richard Gere in the title role. The ensemble cast includes Edward Woodward and his son Tim, Alice Krige, Denis Quilley, Cherie Lunghi, Hurd Hatfield, John Castle, Jean-Marc Barr, Christopher Malcolm, Niall Buggy, John Hallam, Jack Klaff, and Gina Bellman.

King David was released by Paramount in the United States on March 29, 1985, while in other countries it was released in 1986 and 1987. Upon release, the film received mostly negative reviews for its screenplay writing, pace, some of the acting and the action sequences. However, Gere's performance and the cinematography were praised. In addition to being a critical failure, the film was also a box-office failure, grossing $5.9 million worldwide against its $21 million production budget.

== Plot ==
The film follows the life of David, drawing mainly from biblical accounts, particularly the Books of Samuel, 1 Chronicles, and the Psalms of David.

In 1000 B.C., King Saul of Israel breaks his covenant with God after failing to destroy the Amalekites. The prophet Samuel declares Israel will need a new king, and anoints David, the youngest son of Jesse. David initially rejects the prophecy, asking that God tell him directly.

In the midst of a costly war with the Philistines, Saul summons the young David, per Samuel's dying instructions. When the Philistine army challenges the Israelites to fight their champion, a giant named Goliath, the unassuming David volunteers and handily kills him with a rock and sling, winning the respect of his countrymen and the fear of their enemies. David becomes a champion warrior in Saul's army and eventually marries the King's daughter Michal. But when Saul sees the growing adoration of his people toward David, he fears the young man will usurp him. He orders David be brought to him, but Saul's son Jonathan helps David escape.

David seeks refuge with the High Priest Ahimelech, who teaches him the word of God and shows him the Ark of the Covenant, which David is shocked to learn is hidden in a cave. Saul and his army catch up and Ahimelech helps David escape, but is killed by Saul for harboring a fugitive. David spends the next several years as a nomad, developing a loyal following, marrying three wives, and rearing two sons.

Eventually, tired of living on the run, David faces up to Saul, first by sneaking into his camp and stealing his sword, then by confronting him the next day, showing that he spared his life and doesn't want any more hostility. Saul is humbled, and declares his love for David as a surrogate son. David's men, however, warn him that the peace will be short-lived and urge him to seek refuge with Achish, Lord of the Philistines. David offers his services as a mercenary in exchange for Achish's protection, and on the condition that he not be made to fight Saul. Achish agrees on the condition that when David is king of Israel, he will relinquish all captured Philistine land. David vows to be a just ruler, and gives Achish his oath. Saul and Jonathan are eventually killed in battle at Mount Gilboa, and David is crowned King of Israel.

As king, David displays vanity, egotism, and a disregard for his prophets’ instructions. He unveils plans to build a fanciful temple to house the Ark, which his prophet Nathan opposes on the grounds that it is contrary to God's preference for simplicity and humility. When Michal rebukes him, David falls for a woman named Bathsheba. She petitions him for her abuse at the hands of her husband Uriah and his refusal to give her a child. David arranges for Uriah to be killed in battle, and he and Bathsheba marry.

At the wedding reception, David's son Absalom kills his paternal half-brother Amnon after learning he raped their half-sister Tamar. David's laws deem that Absalom must be put to death, but the King insists he was avenging his sister, and banishes him from the kingdom instead. David's prophet Nathan eventually confronts him about Uriah's death. Fearing God will have her put to death, David pleads with him. Nathan concedes, but tells him that his first-born child with Bathsheba will not live to adulthood. David prays for forgiveness, but their first child dies after seven days. His second-born, Solomon, survives, and is proclaimed by Nathan to be heir to the throne. However, David argues that since Absalom is his eldest son, he is therefore the rightful heir despite his exile.

During his three years of banishment, Absalom develops a following of his own. He campaigns to be made a judge, and fights against injustice on their behalf, against the King. David's advisors warn that Absalom is a traitor, planning an insurrection against him, but David defends his son.

Elsewhere, Absalom is led to believe that his father has forsaken him, and will declare Solomon as his heir. Absalom is advised to attack the kingdom, and organize an army. Against David's wishes, his army rides to fight Absalom's men and is ambushed. While trying to escape, Absalom is killed. David laments the death of his son, and Nathan chastises him for following his own emotions and disobeying God's law. David is apathetic, but eventually follows the commands delivered by the prophets, and successfully drives the Philistines from Israel. He destroys the model of his Ark temple, the final symbol of his vanity, and goes on to rule his kingdom justly.

After forty years, David anoints Solomon to be the next king. On his deathbed, David instructs his son to rule with his heart, before remembering Jonathan.

== Cast ==
- Richard Gere as David
  - Ian Sears as young David
- Edward Woodward as Saul
- Alice Krige as Bathsheba
- Denis Quilley as Samuel
- Niall Buggy as Nathan
- Cherie Lunghi as Michal
- Hurd Hatfield as Ahimelech
- Jack Klaff as Jonathan
- John Castle as Abner
- Tim Woodward as Joab
- David de Keyser as Ahitophel
- Simon Dutton as Eliab
- Jean-Marc Barr as Absalom
  - Shimon Avidan as young Absalom
- Arthur Whybrow as Jesse
- Christopher Malcolm as Doeg the Edomite
- Valentine Pelka as Shammah
- Ned Vukovic as Malchishua
- Gina Bellman as Tamar
- James Coombes as Amnon
- James Lister as Uriah
- Jason Carter as young Solomon
  - Nicholas van der Weide as adult Solomon
- Genevieve Allenbury as Ahinoam
- Massimo Sarchielli as Palastu
- Aïché Nana as Ahinoab
- Ishia Bennison as Maacah
- Jenny Lipman as Abigail
- Marino Masé as Agag
- George Eastman as Goliath
- Roberto Renna as Zabad
- Anton Alexander as Runner
- Michael Müller as Abinadab
- Mark Drewry as Ishbosheth
- John Gabriel as King Jehosaphat
- Lorenzo Piani as Guardian
- John Barrard as Benjamite Elder
- David Graham as Ephraimite Elder
- John Hallam as Philistine Armour Bearer
- Tomás Milián as Akiss (uncredited)

== Production ==
=== Development ===
In July 1978 Michael Eisner of Paramount said he wanted the studio to make a Biblical film for release in 1981. The studio chose the King David script. According to Andrew Birkin, who was one of the later writers, the studio were attracted to the story because of its parallels to Star Wars with David as Luke Skywalker and Samuel as Obi-Wan Kenobi. Jeffrey Katzenberg of Paramount met Bruce Beresford at the 1980 Cannes Film Festival when the director was there with Breaker Morant. He gave Beresford the script. Beresford "liked the story, didn't like the script" so brought in Birkin "who's come up with an outstanding screenplay."

Birkin felt David's story was more ideal for a ten-hour mini series and struggled to include key elements like Samuel. "I found the brutality of the Old Testament hard to take" said Birkin. "I hadn't realized that God's commandments were set out so clearly -there's no pink pages. It was hard to make God a hero. It was also hard in 1984 to write a film about our late lamented Imperialists. This is not a Ten Commandments story of beleaguered people in exile. David was the Cecil Rhodes of Ancient Israel. It was hard to make a case for him, the kind who carved an empire according to the map devised by Abraham."

Beresford said, "The forces that impinged on David, the decisions he had to make, the relationships he had with people and with God and the way he felt about Him – it becomes fascinating when you follow everything that happened to David from his childhood to his death." "What made David fascinating were his strengths and weaknesses", said Beresford. Beresford watched a number of Biblical films and was most impressed by The Gospel According to St. Matthew and Jesus of Nazareth.

In June 1982, Beresford said he would make the film for Paramount, after he made Tender Mercies. In February 1983, he said the budget would be $16 million and "it's got an absolutely wonderful script. I think we've gotten away from all of those old clichés of Hollywood biblical movies." "What I want to do is make a different sort of Biblical film", he said. "The ones Hollywood made in the past were far too reverential. It was as if the moment they got hold of the Bible they became awestruck. The actors fell over themselves to be sententious and all those heavenly choirs and shafts of light... The only way is for actors to speak the lines normally not as if they were inverted commas." "Religion has to come into King David, because it was part of everybody's everyday life then", said Beresford. "People used to talk about God like we talk about going to a restaurant. They'd say: 'God did this. God did that.' But the emotional experiences in the film will be easily recognizable because they're so universal."

Beresford wanted American actors rather than English ones to give the movie a more contemporary feel. The producer said he personally chose Richard Gere to play the lead. However, a later report said Beresford wanted to use an unknown and Gere was forced upon him. "Bruce knew what the reaction would be toward Gere in the role", said the source. "He knew it would be ridiculous, but, once he'd signed on, he couldn't just walk off. He knew that if he did, he'd never work in Hollywood again."

The film was originally going to be shot in Israel. Eventually it was decided this was impractical as Israel did not have any buildings older than the Roman Empire. They considered Morocco and Tunisia before settling on Italy. Beresford wanted to cast Jack Thompson as Saul but was overruled by the producers who wanted Sean Connery. Connery asked for too much money so Edward Woodward was cast.

=== Filming ===
Filming started in May 1984 in England, by which time the budget was $23 million. Locations included Matera and Craco both in Basilicata, and Campo Imperatore in Abruzzo, the Lanaitto valley (Oliena) in Sardinia, Italy, and at Pinewood Studios in England.

It was a difficult shoot. Both Beresford and Gere came down with viruses. Extras went on strike for more pay. Many locations were remote. The script used was the ninth draft. "Normally if you're making an ordinary movie and the weather turns bad you say: 'Oh well, we'll shoot tomorrow'", said Beresford. "But if you've got 2,000 extras there and suddenly it starts snowing-as it did with us-it's useless saying: I can't shoot in this. You've got to because you can't get the people back again."

According to one report "Gere knew Beresford wanted him replaced, and that made for quite a bit of friction on the set. Beresford did what he wanted to do in the scenes where Gere doesn't appear, and Gere did what he wanted to do in his scenes. The film ended up as a multi-million dollar joke that everyone thinks is funny except the people who made it and the Paramount investors."

Beresford later said "The King David script was just never right. We started off on the wrong foot and then it turned into a catalogue of disaster. Really, I don't know how I got mixed up in such a mess – I felt like the captain of the Titanic heading toward a critical iceberg and I hit it. It was inevitable."

== Reception ==
The film was not well received by the critics, with The New York Times calling it "not a good film". Review aggregate Rotten Tomatoes gave the film a 'rotten' 8% rating from 12 reviews.

Audiences polled by CinemaScore gave the film an average grade of "C" on an A+ to F scale. Richard Gere's performance in the film earned him a nomination for the Golden Raspberry Award for Worst Actor, which he lost to Sylvester Stallone for Rambo: First Blood Part II and Rocky IV at the 6th Golden Raspberry Awards.

=== Box office ===
Beresford said "The film cost $22 million and lost it all – and more. And the minute the movie died, I checked out a list of famous directors who also had works that bombed – to see if they ever got back on the right foot again."

=== Beresford's reaction ===
Years later, Bruce Beresford said of the film:

I think there are a few things in it that are interesting. But, I think there are so many things that are wrong. We never liked the script... we never really caught the friendship between David and Jonathan. There weren't enough scenes between them. And David, himself – I think Richard Gere was miscast. He is a wonderful actor but he is much better in contemporary pieces.

== See also ==
- List of historical drama films
- David and Bathsheba
- Kings (U.S. TV series)
