= Bathsheba (Memling) =

Painting by Hans Memling

Bathsheba at her Bath
- Bathseba im Bade (German)
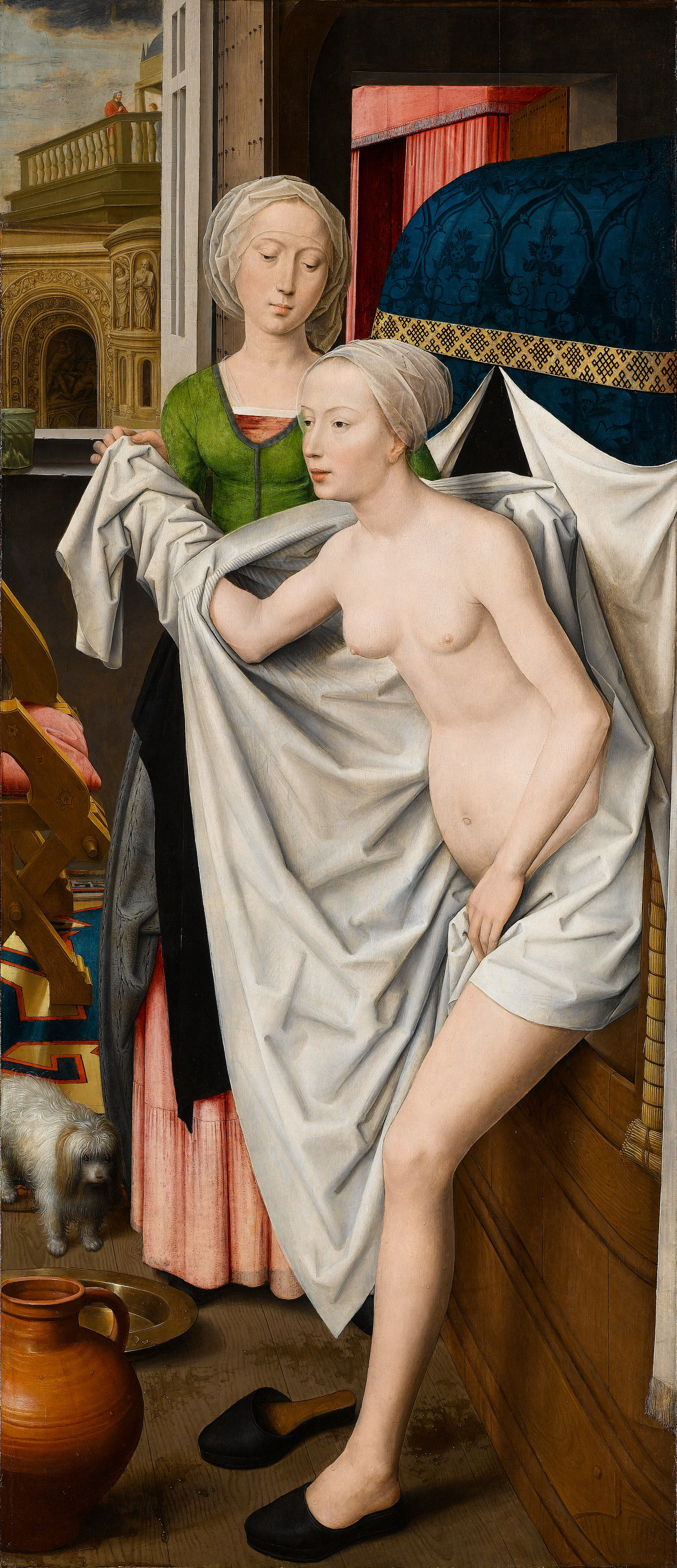
- Artist: Hans Memling
- Year: c. 1485
- Medium: Oil on panel
- Dimensions: 191.5 cm × 84.5 cm (75.4 in × 33.3 in)
- Location: Staatsgalerie Stuttgart

Bathsheba (or The Toilet of Bathsheba After the Bath) is a c. 1485 oil on wood panel painting by the Early Netherlandish artist Hans Memling, now in the Staatsgalerie, Stuttgart. The painting is a rare 15th century depiction of a nude person in Northern Renaissance art; such figures typically only appeared in representations of the Last Judgement, and were hardly as deliberately erotic. Memling is attributed one other secular nude portrait, in the center panel of his c. 1485 Vanitas allegory Triptych of Earthly Vanity and Divine Salvation, at the Musée des Beaux-Arts, Strasbourg.

== Description ==
It shows Bathsheba, wife of Uriah the Hittite and later of David, assisted by her maid as she rises from her indoor bath, as related in 2 Samuel 11. Bathsheba is naked save a robe which the maid is about to wrap but has not quite wrapped around her. The women are indoors but before an open window which leads out to a courtyard and skyscape. The bath from which Bathsheba emerges is pillared, with a roof of cushioned black velvet. There is a small white dog by her right foot. In the background, King David and a boy can be seen standing on the balcony high above.

The maid's facial type, demeanour and clothing bear the strong influence of Rogier van der Weyden's depictions of the Virgin Mary. The figure of Bathsheba has been compared to that in Jan van Eyck's now lost Woman Bathing, although that painting is more allegorical than narrative. As opposed to Bathsheba, she is fully nude.

Its unusually close framing and the fact that many of the details are cut off suggests that it is a fragment of a larger, probably religious, panel or triptych that was broken up.

== Sources ==
- Exum, Cheryl. Cultural Representations of Biblical Women. ISBN 978-0-567-23429-2
- Panofsky, Erwin. Early Netherlandish Painting. London: Harper Collins, 1953. ISBN 978-0-06-430002-5
- Ridderbos, Bernhard; Van Buren, Anne; Van Veen, Henk. Early Netherlandish Paintings: Rediscovery, Reception and Research. Amsterdam: Amsterdam University Press, 2005. ISBN 0-89236-816-0
- De Vos, Dirk. Hans Memling: The Complete Works. Ghent: Harry N Abrams, 1994. ISBN 978-0-8109-3649-2
