= Bathsheba at the Fountain =

Painting by Peter Paul Rubens

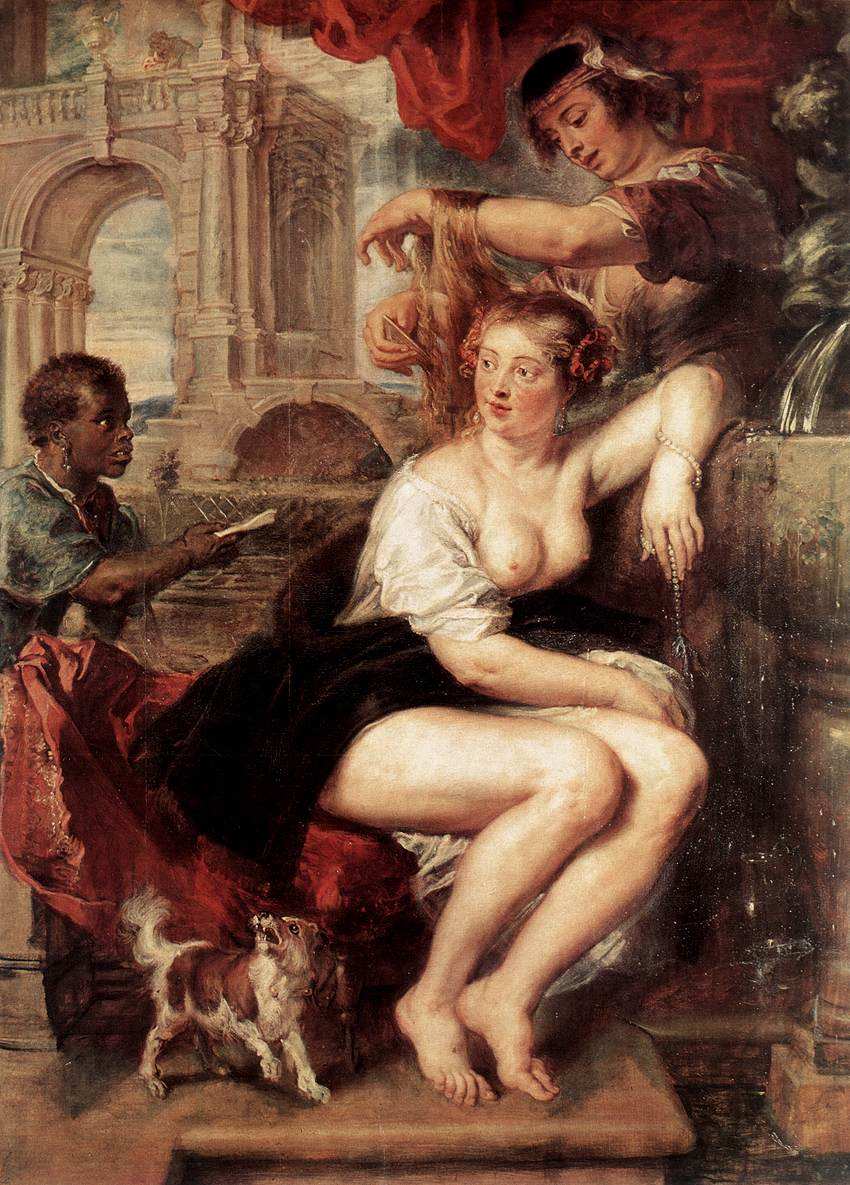
- Artist: Peter Paul Rubens
- Year: c. 1635
- Medium: Oil on oak
- Dimensions: 175 cm × 126 cm (69 in × 50 in)
- Location: Gemäldegalerie Alte Meister, Dresden

Bathsheba at the Fountain is a painting by Peter Paul Rubens completed around 1635.

== Subject ==
The central figure is Bathsheba, a character from the Bible. She was the wife of Uriah the Hittite. The story, related in 2 Samuel 11 describes how King David, who is shown as a small figure on a balcony in the top left corner, saw Bathsheba bathing and fell in love with her. This painting shows her receiving the letter from David, inviting her for a discreet meeting, being delivered.

Bathsheba is attended by a maid who is combing her hair. There is also an African servant who is delivering David's letter. A dog is at her feet. Bathsheba is smiling and looking into the distance.
