= Bathsheba at Her Bath (Ricci) =

Painting by Sebastiano Ricci

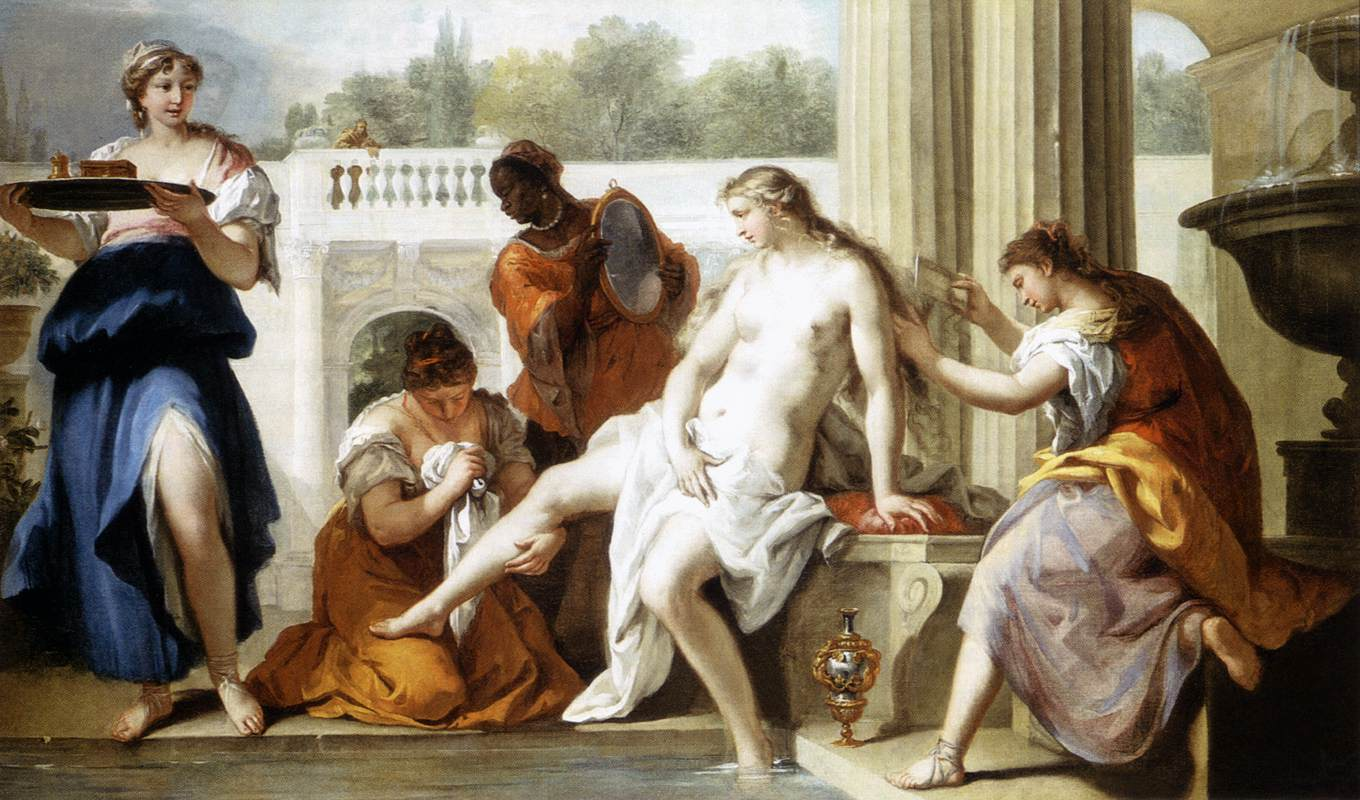
- Artist: Sebastiano Ricci
- Year: c. 1724
- Medium: oil on canvas
- Dimensions: 118.5 cm × 199 cm (46.7 in × 78 in)
- Location: Museum of Fine Arts, Budapest

Bathsheba at Her Bath is an oil painting on canvas of c. 1724 by the Venetian artist Sebastiano Ricci which is in the collection of the Museum of Fine Arts, Budapest. A common subject amongst artists, this was the first of two of Ricci's depictions of the theme.

The painting depicts the Biblical story (as narrated in 2 Samuel 11) of the seduction of Bathsheba, the wife of Uriah the Hittite, by the Israelite king, David. In the painting Bathsheba, attended by four maidservants, is taking a ritual bath in the open air whilst being observed by King David from his nearby palace roof.

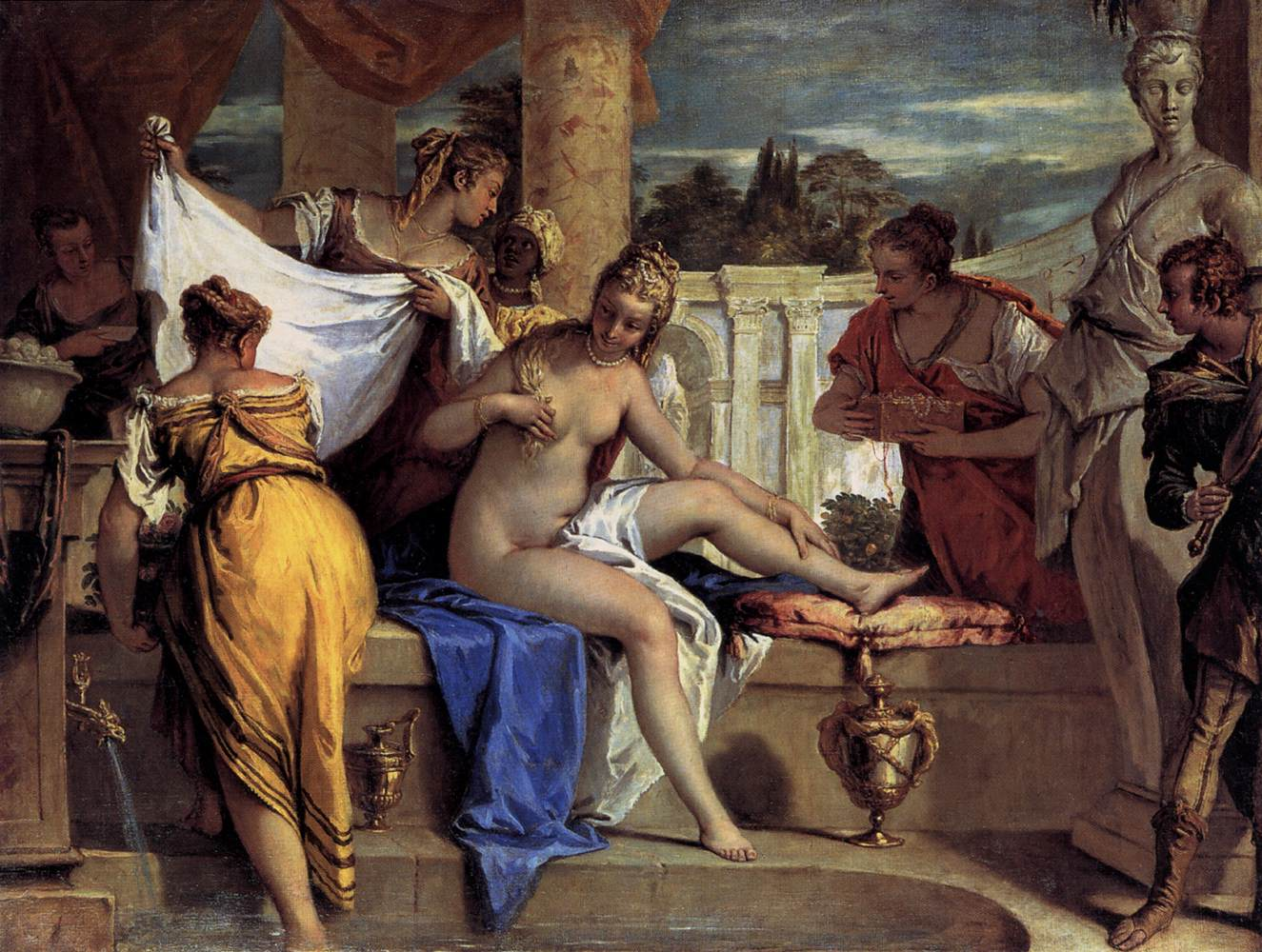
Bathsheba, Sebastiano Ricci, 1725, Gemäldegalerie, Berlin

As in the other Ricci work, the background is composed of columns and balconies and the painting uniformly illuminated with light with very little shade. Bathsheba's vanity is exemplified by the way she is looking into a mirror and David's kingship by the fact that he is wearing a crown.

In Ricci's later reworking of the subject, the image of David is replaced by one of his messenger.

== See also ==
- 100 Great Paintings, 1980 BBC series
