= Bathsheba (Gentileschi) =

Painting by Artemisia Gentileschi

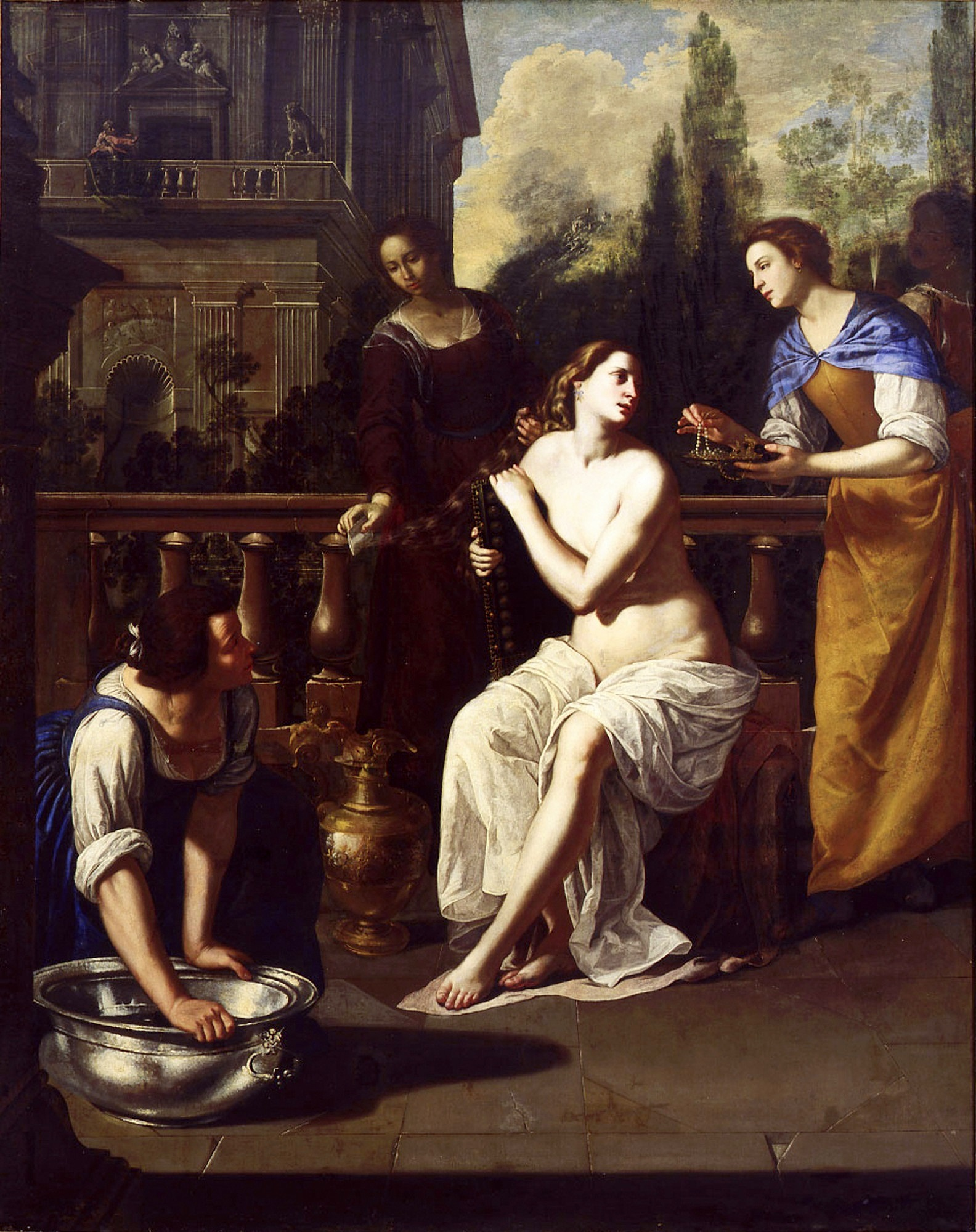
- Artists: Artemisia Gentileschi with Viviano Codazzi and Domenico Gargiulo
- Year: c. 1636–1637
- Type: Oil on canvas
- Movement: Baroque
- Dimensions: 265 cm × 210 cm (104.5 in × 82.5 in)
- Location: Columbus Museum of Art, Ohio

Bathsheba is a painting of 1636–1637 by the Baroque painter Artemisia Gentileschi, with contributions by Viviano Codazzi (who painted the architecture at the top left of the painting) and Domenico Gargiulo (who painted the landscape). It shows the Hittite woman Bathsheba being washed and tended to by her servants. At the top left of the painting, King David sees her from his palace. It was one of seven versions from the story of Bathsheba that Gentileschi painted.

The painting is now in the collection of the Columbus Museum of Art, Ohio.

== Subject ==
The subject, traditionally called Bathsheba at her Bath, is drawn from the Second Book of Samuel, 2 Samuel 11, which recounts that while Bathsheba bathed, King David witnessed the event from his palace balcony. David was instantaneously smitten with Bathsheba. He invited her to his palace chambers and proceeded to seduce and impregnate her. At the time, Bathsheba was married to a soldier in David's army. His death in battle was arranged by King David himself. David then married Bathsheba, and their son was born.

The painting depicts the precise moment that David spots Bathsheba (David is the tiny figure at the top left of the picture). However, the focus of the painting is entirely on the calm Bathsheba as she is attended by her servants.

== Interpretation ==
There is general agreement that this painting is in Gentileschi's latter style, when she was living in Naples and more influenced by the Bolognese classicist school than by the Caravaggist paintings of her earlier career. An eighteenth-century biographer went as far as to make an explicit link between Gentileschi's style and that of the Bolognese painter Guido Reni. Some art historians have been positive about the painting: Keith Christiansen says it "demonstrates the sophisticated construction of one of Artemisia's most accomplished works". Letizia Treves writes that "Artemisia successfully met the challenge of composing a large scene with multiple in figures in different planes, producing one of the most accomplished works of her maturity." However, Jesse Locker (who dates the painting to the 1640s rather than 1630s) says that the Bathsheba is one of her later paintings "that to modern eyes appear anodyne, excessively finished." Another interpretation, written by R. Ward Bissell, proposes that Gentileschi’s first representation of Bathsheba critiques the nature and values of the aristocrats: “she had not yet introduced the aristocratic superficiality of her later versions of the theme, and in the manner in which Bathsheba grips the chair and looks past the maid who offers the jewels there is a psychological strength which they lack.”

== Condition of painting ==
The painting has been restored two times, in 1979 and again in 1996, repairing three tears in the canvas. The quality of the paintwork still reflects the passage of time, however. The colors of some of the figures are flattened and there is much abrasion in the landscape parts of the image.

== Provenance ==
The first recorded owner of the painting was Luigi Rome, Baron of San Luigi, Naples in the 1740s, who also owned a painting of Susannah by Gentileschi. After passing through a series of Roman antique dealers, the painting was purchased by Colnaghi in 1962. The current owners acquired the work from Colnaghi in February 1967.

== See also ==
- List of works by Artemisia Gentileschi
