= Bathsheba (Hayez) =

Painting by Francesco Hayez

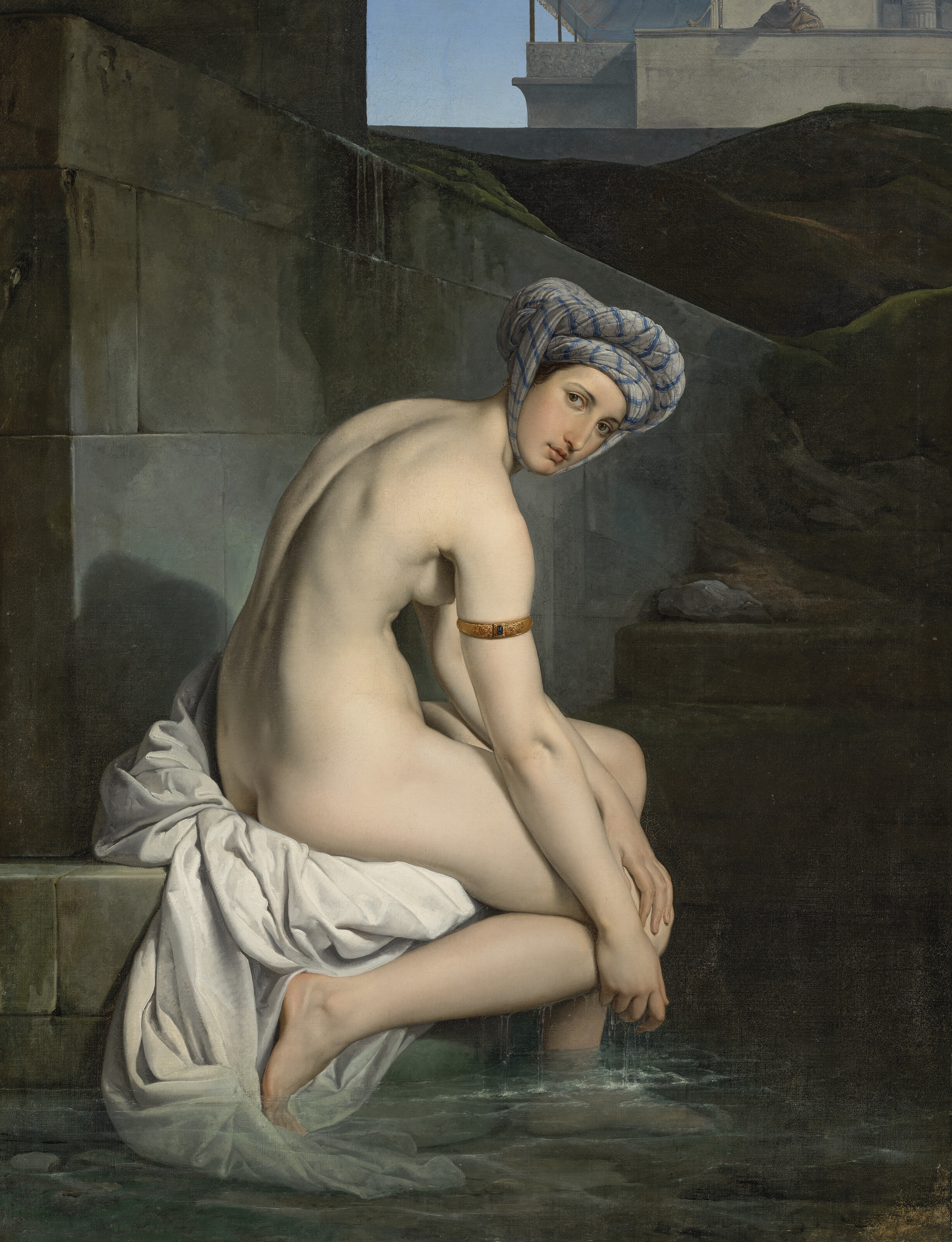
- Artist: Francesco Hayez
- Year: 1827
- Type: Oil on canvas, religious art
- Dimensions: 149.9 cm × 115.6 cm (59.0 in × 45.5 in)
- Location: Private collection

Bathsheba (Italian: Betsabea) is an 1827 history painting by the Italian artist Francesco Hayez. It features the biblical figure of Bathsheba in a nude scene, who is watched bathing by the Israelite king David. She is shown facing away from the viewer and wearing a single bangle on her arm while David can be seen at a high vantage point at the top of the painting. Numerous paintings had been produced from the Renaissance era onwards featuring the scene. It was the first of three paintings Hayez would produce featuring Bathsheba.

Hayez appears to have produced the work on his own initiative without a commission. It was exhibited at the Brera Academy in Milan the same year and acquired by William I of Württemberg. Its rediscovery in 1998 was described by Fernando Mazzocca as "one of the most sensational rediscoveries in the history of nineteenth century Italian art".

== Bibliography ==
- Androsov, Sergej (ed.) Canova: l'ideale classico tra scultura e pittura. Silvana, 2009.
- Jones, Tom Devonshire, Murray, Linda & Murray, Peter. The Oxford Dictionary of Christian Art and Architecture. OUP Oxford, 2013.
- Mazzocca, Fernando. Francesco Hayez: catalogo ragionato. F. Motta, 1994.
