= Bathsheba at Her Bath (Veronese) =

Painting by Paolo Veronese

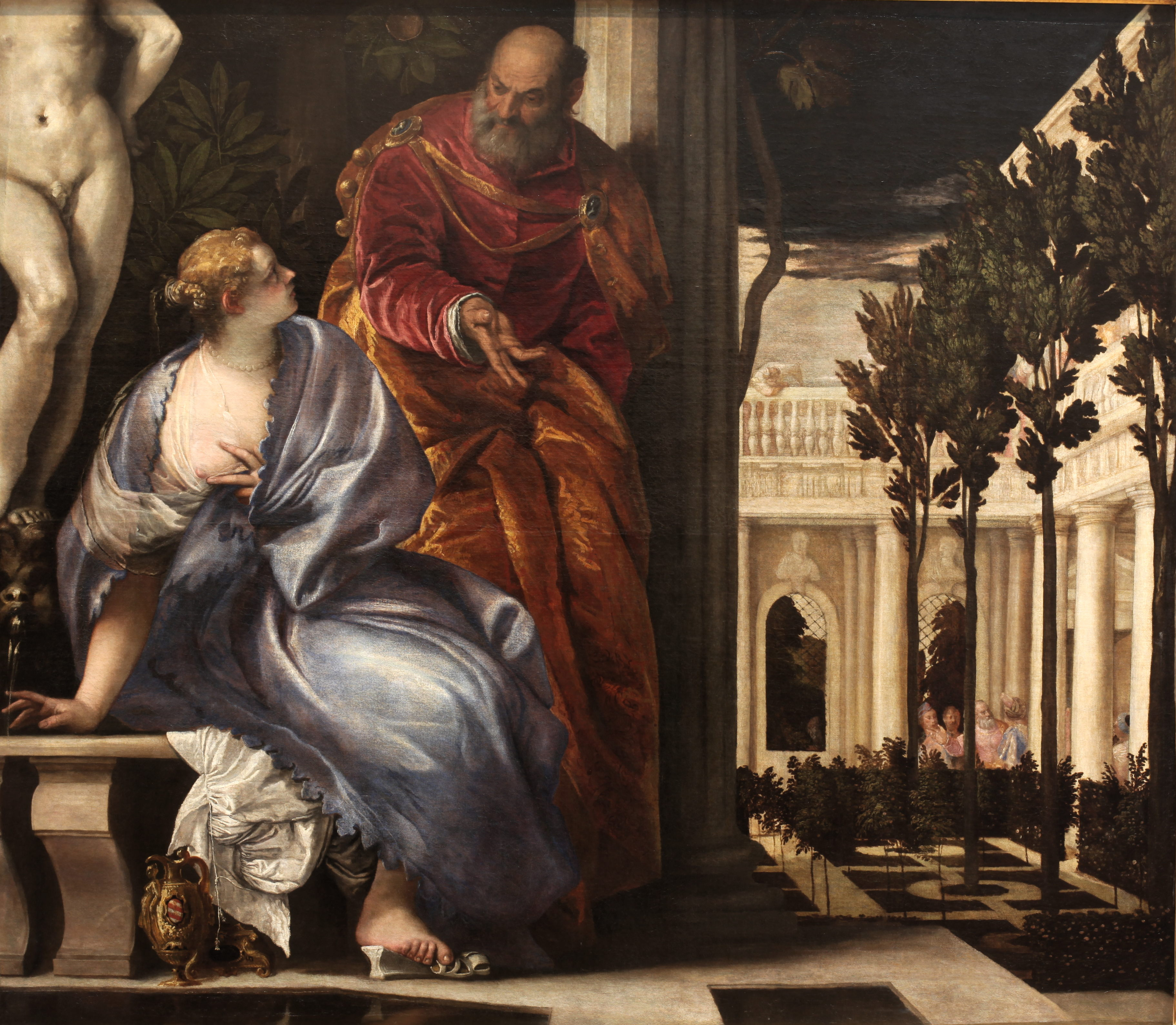
- Artist: Paolo Veronese
- Year: 1575
- Type: oil painting
- Dimensions: 191 cm × 224 cm (75 in × 88 in)
- Location: Musée des Beaux-Arts; Lyon

Bathsheba at Her Bath is an oil painting on canvas by the Italian Renaissance painter Paolo Veronese, dated to around 1575 and now in the Musée des Beaux-Arts de Lyon, France.

== History ==
This work is a marriage painting ordered by a Venetian customer. It arrived in France in the seventeenth century in the royal collections. It was then kept at the Palace of Versailles, enlarged atop and on the left side to match the woodwork. It was sent to Lyon by the State in 1811, and is currently at the Musée des Beaux-Arts de Lyon. Its original format was restored in 1991, keeping the extension behind the new guidelines.

== Composition ==
The painting depicts a biblical scene. It is generally agreed that the episode depicted is 2 Samuel 11, in which Bathsheba is seen by King David from the terrace of his palace while she bathes in the evening. Some sources have identified a different biblical story, namely Susannah and the Elders, as the painting's subject. In this story, Susannah bathes on a hot day and is watched by two old men (the characters in the arcades in the background) whose sexual demands Susannah refuses and who avenge themselves by unjustly accusing her of adultery.

In this painting, one of his many masterpieces, Veronese vertically divided the space into two separate parts linked by agreements in the colors and a powerful chiaroscuro. The old man wears the cloak of gold buttons which is characteristic of the Doges of Venice. The arms represented on the pitcher may reflect the celebration of a marriage or an alliance between two powerful Venetian families.

== Analysis ==
The painting deals with the theme of adultery linked to that of Justice. According to art historians Daniel Arasse and Joséphine Le Foll, two biblical stories are intertwined in this painting:

- The theme of Susanna is suggested by the presence of the fountain and an old man, but there is only one (if one considers that the elders are the ones in the arcades, while the presence of man in red in the foreground is inexplicable).
- The theme of David and Bathsheba has an old David, and this is unusual especially as artists generally follow the Bible, in which David sent a young messenger to Bathsheba rather than going to meet her in person, as in the painting by Jan Matsys in the Louvre. However, in other paintings of this subject it is sometimes David himself who comes to see Bathsheba, which would be the case here.
