= David and Bathsheba (film) =

1951 film by Henry King

- Theatrical release poster
- Directed by: Henry King
- Written by: Philip Dunne
- Based on: Second Book of Samuel
- Produced by: Darryl F. Zanuck
- Starring: Gregory Peck; Susan Hayward; Raymond Massey; Kieron Moore; James Robertson Justice
- Cinematography: Leon Shamroy
- Edited by: Barbara McLean
- Music by: Alfred Newman; Edward Powell
- Distributed by: 20th Century-Fox
- Release dates: August 14, 1951 (New York City); August 30, 1951 (Los Angeles)
- Running time: 116 minutes
- Country: United States
- Language: English
- Budget: $2.17 million
- Box office: $4.72 million (U.S. and Canada rentals)

David and Bathsheba is a 1951 American epic film produced by 20th Century-Fox and starring Gregory Peck as King David. It was directed by Henry King and produced by Darryl F. Zanuck, with a screenplay by Philip Dunne and cinematography by Leon Shamroy.

The film follows King David's life and his relationship with Uriah's wife Bathsheba, played by Susan Hayward. Goliath is portrayed by 6 ft 8 in (2.03 m) Lithuanian wrestler Walter Talun.

== Plot ==
David ben Jesse, the second king of Israel, returns to Jerusalem after a military victory over the Philistines. En route, a cart bearing the Ark of the Covenant nearly capsizes. Uzzah, a captain in David's army, attempts to prevent the Ark from falling and abruptly dies touching it. While the prophet Nathan declares it the will of God, a skeptical David pronounces it as natural causes. David is attracted to Bathsheba, wife of his captain Uriah the Hittite.

The attraction is mutual, although both know an affair would break the law of Moses. When Bathsheba becomes pregnant, David sends for Uriah, hoping his spending time with Bathsheba will cover her pregnancy. David's wife Michal, who knows about the affair, tells David that Uriah did not return home; he slept at the castle, as a sign of loyalty to his king. David orders Uriah to the front line while withdrawing his own troops, leaving Uriah to die. David sends Bathsheba word of her husband's death, and the two plan their marriage.

Nathan informs David that the Israelites are dissatisfied with his leadership; they want David's sons to rule. Nathan says David has forgotten he is the Lord's servant. Shortly after David marries Bathsheba, a drought hits Israel and the couple's newborn child dies. Nathan returns to tell David that God is displeased with him. However, he will not die as the law demands, but will be punished through family misfortune. David takes full responsibility, insisting Bathsheba is blameless, but the people want her killed. David plans to save Bathsheba, but she tells David they are both equally at fault.

David is reminded of the Lord and quotes Psalm 23 while playing his harp. David tells Bathsheba she will not die; he accepts God's justice for himself. A repentant David, seeking relief from the drought as well as forgiveness, enters the Holy of Holies. He begs God not to punish Israel for his sins. David touches the Ark as a suicide attempt. There is a clap of thunder, followed by flashbacks to David's youth, depicting his anointing by Samuel, his battle with Goliath, and the like.

King David removes his hands from the Ark. Outside, rain falls on the dry land.

== Cast ==
- Gregory Peck as King David
- Susan Hayward as Bathsheba
- Kieron Moore as Uriah
- Raymond Massey as Nathan
- James Robertson Justice as Abishai
- Jayne Meadows as Michal
- John Sutton as Ira
- Dennis Hoey as Joab
- Walter Talun as Goliath
- Francis X. Bushman as King Saul
- Leo Pessin as Young David
- Paul Newlan as Samuel
- Holmes Herbert as Jesse (uncredited)
- William Severn as Shepherd Boy
- Gwen Verdon as Specialty Dancer
- George Zucco as Egyptian Ambassador

== Production ==
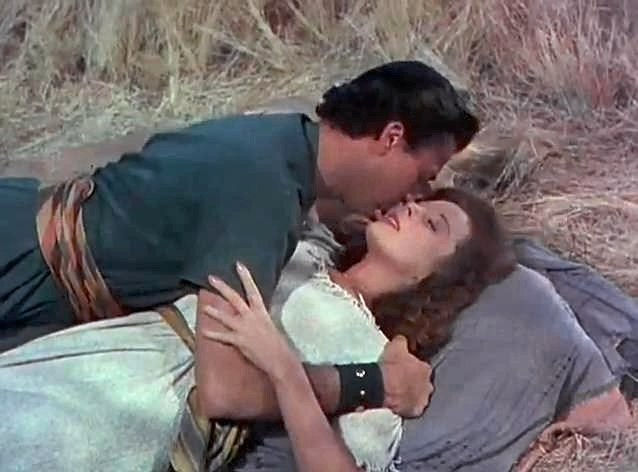
Gregory Peck and Susan Hayward

While Twentieth Century-Fox owned the rights to the 1943 book David written by Duff Cooper, the film was not based on that book. Darryl F. Zanuck had owned the rights to a 1947 Broadway play called Bathsheba. After the success of Cecil B. DeMille's Samson and Delilah (1949) for Paramount Pictures, Zanuck commissioned Philip Dunne to write a script based on King David.

Dunne's original concept was for a film that would encompass David's life in three main chapters: David as a boy fighting Goliath; a more mature David and his friendship with Jonathan ending with his affair with Bathsheba; and an older David and his relationship with his son Absalom. Dunne estimated that his treatment would make a four-hour film, but Zanuck was not enthusiastic. Dunne then pitched the idea of a film solely based on David and Bathsheba, which Zanuck loved. Dunne conceived the story as a modern play exploring the corruption of absolute power. The film is noticeably devoid of the epic battles and panoramas frequently seen in biblical movies. Zanuck opted to use stars already under contract with Twentieth Century-Fox. Filming took place entirely in Nogales, Arizona from November 24, 1950 until January 1951 (with some additional material shot in February).

The musical score was written by Alfred Newman. For the bucolic scene with the shepherd boy, Newman used a solo oboe in the Lydian mode, drawing on long-established conventions linking the solo oboe with pastoral scenes and the shepherd's pipe. To underscore David's guilt-ridden turmoil in the Mount Gilboa scene, Newman employed a vibraphone, which Miklós Rózsa had used in scoring Peck's popular Spellbound (1945).

== Release ==
David and Bathsheba premiered at the Rivoli Theatre in New York City on August 14, 1951. The film subsequently opened in Los Angeles on August 30 before opening widely in September. During the film's worldwide release, the film was banned in Singapore as the country's censorship board were troubled by the unflattering portrait of David, an important prophet in Islam, as a hedonist susceptible to sexual overtures.

== Reception ==
David and Bathsheba earned $4.72 million in theater rentals from the United States and Canada.

A. H. Weiler of The New York Times described the film as "a reverential and sometimes majestic treatment of chronicles that have lived three millennia." He praised Dunne's screenplay and Peck's "authoritative performance" but found that Hayward "seems closer to Hollywood than to the arid Jerusalem of the Bible." Abel Green of Variety wrote: "This is a big picture in every respect. It has scope, pageantry, sex (for all its Biblical background), cast names, color—everything. It's a surefire boxoffice entry, one of the really 'big' pictures of the new selling season." Philip K. Scheuer of the Los Angeles Times wrote that the film "leaves little to be desired" from the standpoint of production values with Peck "ingratiating" as David and Hayward "a seductress with flaming tresses, in or out of the bath, and only her final contrition is a little difficult to believe."

Richard L. Coe of The Washington Post wrote: "On the whole, the picture suggests a Reader's Digest story expanded into a master's thesis for the Ecole Copacabana." Harrison's Reports wrote, "The outstanding thing about the production is the magnificent performance of Gregory Peck as David; he makes the characterization real and human, endowing it with all the shortcomings of a man who lusts for another's wife, but who is seriously penitent and prepared to shoulder his guilt. Susan Hayward, as Bathsheba, is beautiful and sexy, but her performance is of no dramatic consequence." The Monthly Film Bulletin commented that the film had been made "with restraint and relative simplicity" compared to other historical epics, "and the playing of Gregory Peck in particular is competent. The whole film, however, is emotionally and stylistically quite unworthy of its subject." Philip Hamburger of The New Yorker wrote that "the accessories notwithstanding, something is ponderously wrong with 'David and Bathsheba.' The fault lies, I suppose, in the attempt to make excessive enlargements of an essentially-simple story."

=== Commentary ===
Jon Solomon, author of The Ancient World in the Cinema, found the film rather slow-paced in the first half before gaining momentum, and Peck "convincing as a once-heroic monarch who must face an angry constituency and atone for his sins." He noted that this was different from other biblical epics in that the protagonist faced a religious and philosophical issue rather than the overdone military or physical crisis.

Theologian David Garland and his wife Diana argued: "Taking remarkable license with the story, the screenwriters changed Bathsheba from the one who is ogled by David into David's stalker. ... [T]he movie David and Bathsheba, written, directed and produced by males, makes the cinematic Bathsheba conform to male fantasies about women." However, religious historian Adele Reinhartz found that by giving Bathsheba a more active role, "it reflects tensions and questions about gender identity in America in the aftermath of World War II, when women had entered the work force in large numbers and experienced a greater degree of independence and economic self-sufficiency. ...[Bathsheba] is not satisfied in the role of neglected wife and decides for herself what to do about it." Susan Hayward was later quoted as having asked why the film was not called Bathsheba and David.

== Awards and nominations ==
| Award | Category | Nominee(s) | Result |
|---|---|---|---|
| Academy Awards | Best Art Direction – Color | Lyle R. Wheeler, George Davis, Thomas Little and Paul S. Fox | Nominated |
| Academy Awards | Best Cinematography – Color | Leon Shamroy | Nominated |
| Academy Awards | Best Costume Design – Color | Charles LeMaire and Edward Stevenson | Nominated |
| Academy Awards | Best Scoring of a Dramatic or Comedy Picture | Alfred Newman | Nominated |
| Academy Awards | Best Story and Screenplay | Philip Dunne | Nominated |
| Bambi Awards | Best Actor – International | Gregory Peck | Won |
| Directors Guild of America Awards | Outstanding Directorial Achievement in Motion Pictures | Henry King | Nominated |
| Picturegoer Awards | Best Actor | Gregory Peck | Nominated |
| Picturegoer Awards | Best Actress | Susan Hayward | Nominated |
