= Bathsheba =

Biblical figure and wife of David

Bathsheba בַּת־שֶׁבַע
- Queen consort of Israel
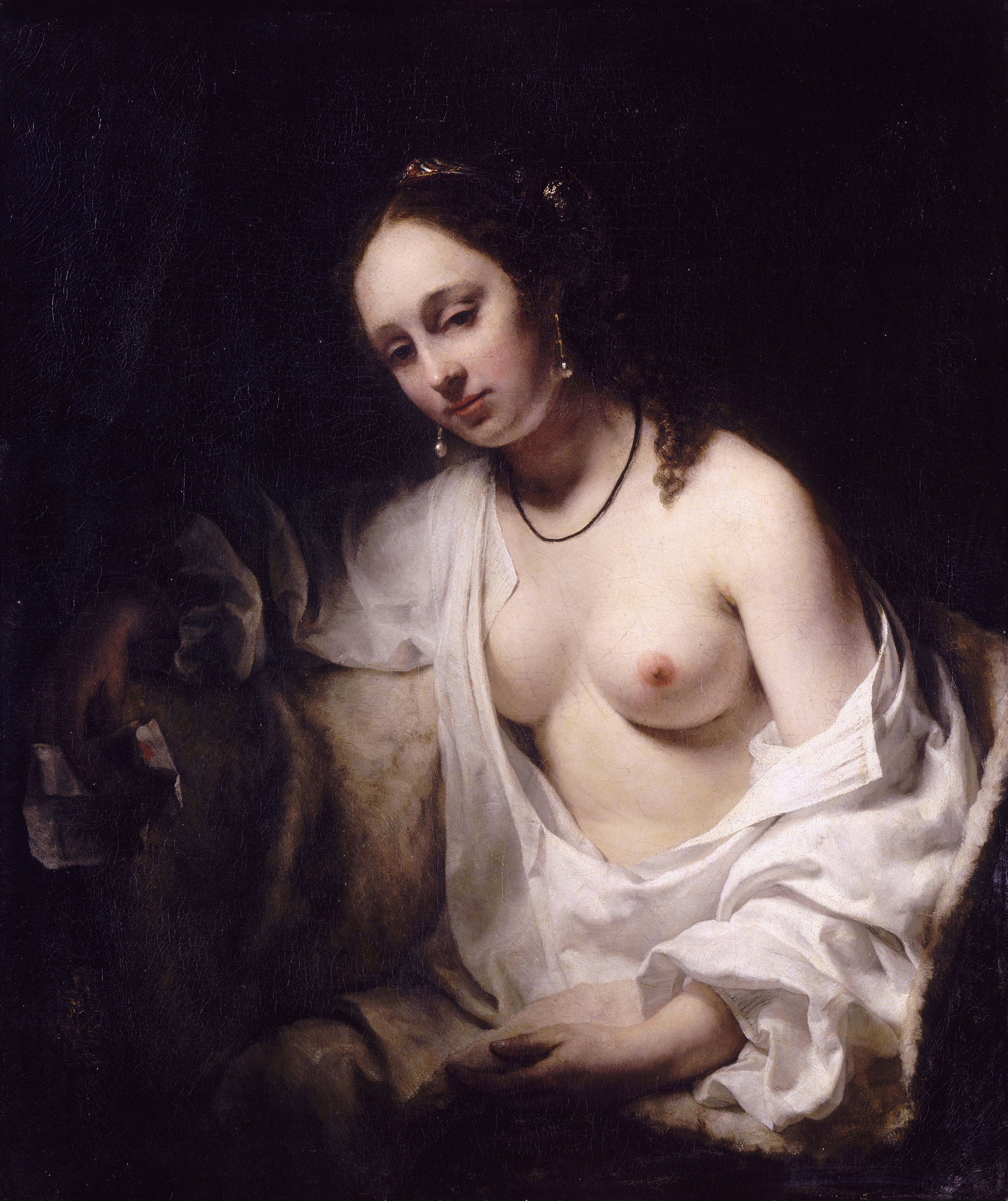
- Bathsheba with King David's Letter (1654) by Willem Drost
- Spouse: Uriah the Hittite; David ben Yishai
- Issue: Shammua; Shobab; Nathan; Solomon
- Dynasty: House of David
- Father: Eliam
- Mother: Unknown
- Religion: Judaism

Bathsheba (/bæθˈʃiːbə, ˈbæθʃɪbə/; Hebrew: בַּת־שֶׁבַע Baṯ-šeḇaʿ, lit. 'Daughter of Sheba' or 'Daughter of the Oath') was an Israelite queen consort. According to the Hebrew Bible, she was the wife of Uriah the Hittite and later of David, with whom she had all of her five children. Her status as the mother of Solomon, who succeeded David as monarch, made her the Gebirah (גְּבִירָה) of the Kingdom of Israel.

Bathsheba is best known for her appearance in the Book of Samuel, which recounts how she was summoned by David's royal messengers after he witnessed her bathing and lusted after her; David has Uriah killed and then marries Bathsheba, incurring the wrath of God, who strikes down the couple's first child in infancy before plunging the House of David into chaos and anguish.

Jewish tradition often identifies her as the granddaughter of Ahithophel, while rabbinic lore describes Satan's role in her encounter with David. In Christianity, Bathsheba appears in Jesus' genealogy (Matthew 1:6) and is linked typologically to the Virgin Mary; Ethiopian Orthodoxy venerates her as a saint. In Islam, her story is rejected as incompatible with prophetic infallibility, with traditions explaining David's marriage to her differently.

Scholars debate whether she was a victim of David's abuse of power or an active participant, and her story influenced views of David's later decline. Bathsheba became a prominent figure in art, literature, music, and film, often depicted bathing as David watches, symbolizing themes of power, desire, and divine judgment.

== Biblical account ==
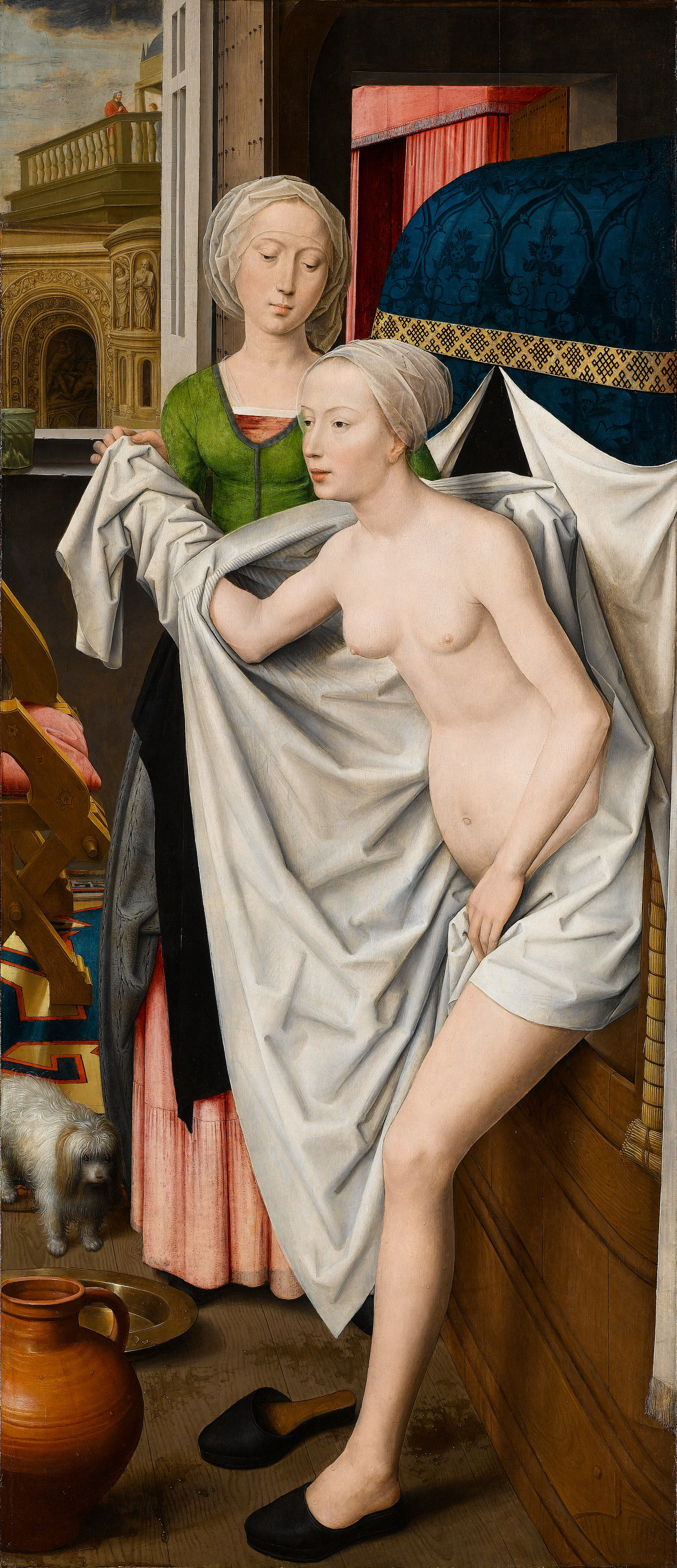
Bathsheba at her Bath by Hans Memling, c. 1485

Bathsheba was either the daughter of Eliam, according to 2 Samuel 11:3, or of Ammiel, according to 1 Chronicles 3:5. And Eliam is mentioned in 2 Samuel 23:34 as the son of Ahithophel the Gilohite. Bathsheba was Uriah the Hittite's wife.

David's initial interactions with Bathsheba are described in 2 Samuel 11. While walking on the roof of his palace, David sees a beautiful woman bathing. He inquires about her, discovering her identity as Uriah's wife. Still desiring her, David later sleeps with Bathsheba, impregnating her.

While the army was on campaign, David summoned Uriah in the hope that Uriah would have sex with Bathsheba, and in turn be convinced that the child she would eventually bear belonged to him. However, Uriah was unwilling to disregard rules applying to warriors on campaign, preferring to remain with the palace troops rather than sleep in his own bed.

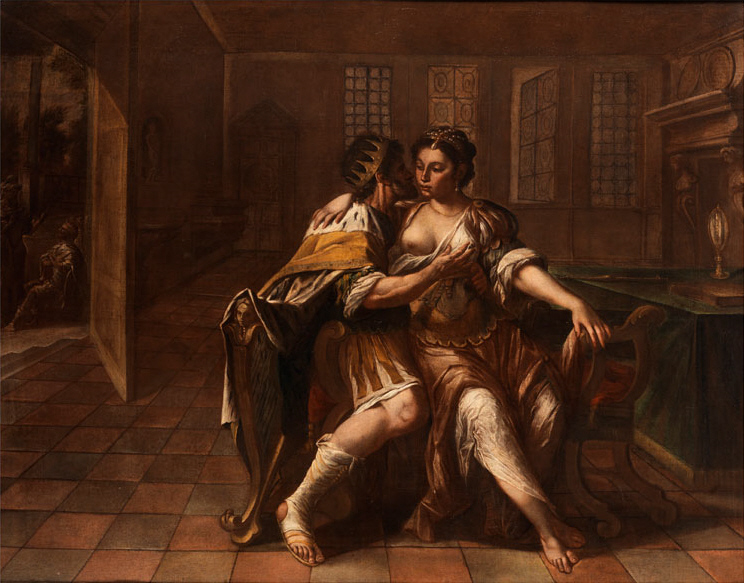
David and Bathsheba depicted in an anonymous 17th-century painting

After repeated efforts to convince Uriah to sleep with his wife failed, David gave an order to his general Joab that Uriah should be placed on the front lines in battle, where he would be in much greater danger. Additionally, David had Uriah himself carry this message back to the army. Uriah was ultimately killed during the siege of Rabbah, and Bathsheba mourned him. Then, David made her his wife, taking her into his house where she gave birth to his child.

David's actions displeased God, who sent the prophet Nathan to reprove the king. In relating a parable describing a rich man who took away the lamb of his poor neighbor, he incited the king's righteous anger, and Nathan then analogized the case directly to David's actions regarding Bathsheba. Nathan declared that God would punish the house of David for Uriah's murder and the taking of his wife. In turn, he would let someone close to David seize all David's wives, and having him lie with them in broad daylight for everyone to see. David at once confessed his sins, expressing sincere repentance. Shortly after Bathsheba's first child by David was born, God struck it with a severe illness. David pleaded with God to spare his child, fasting and spending the nights lying in sackcloth on the ground, but after seven days the child died. David accepted this as his punishment, and then went to the house of God to worship him.

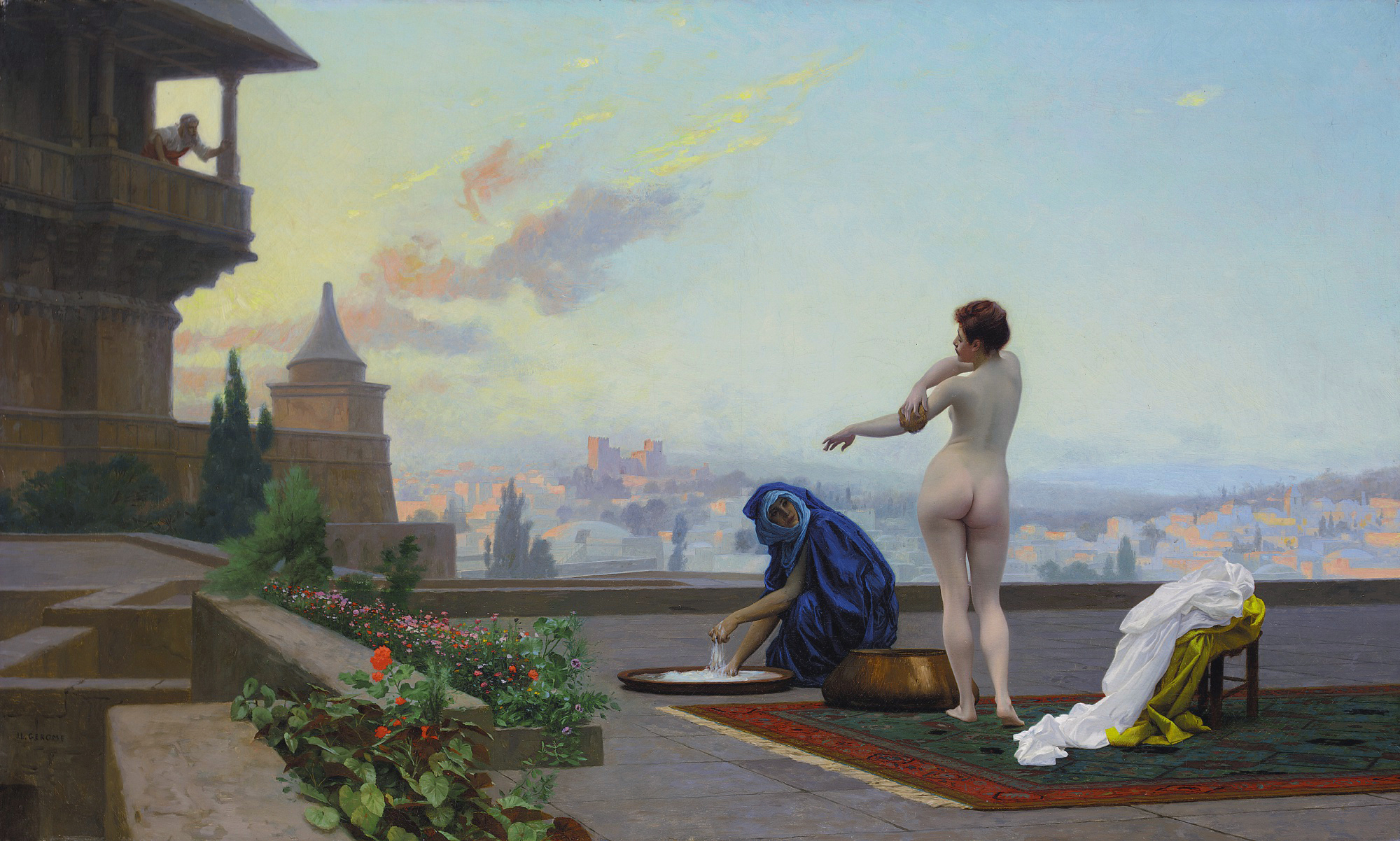
Jean-Léon Gérôme's depiction of Bathsheba bathing watched by David

David and Bathsheba would later have another son, Solomon. In David's old age, Bathsheba secured Solomon's succession to the throne instead of David's older surviving sons by other wives, based on promises David made to her. Nathan's prophecy came to pass years later when another of David's sons, the much-loved Absalom, led an insurrection that plunged the kingdom into civil war. To manifest his claim as the new king, Absalom had sex in public with ten of his father's concubines (2 Samuel 16), considered to be a direct, tenfold divine retribution for David's taking of another man's woman in secret.

== Judaism ==
=== Relationship to Ahithophel ===
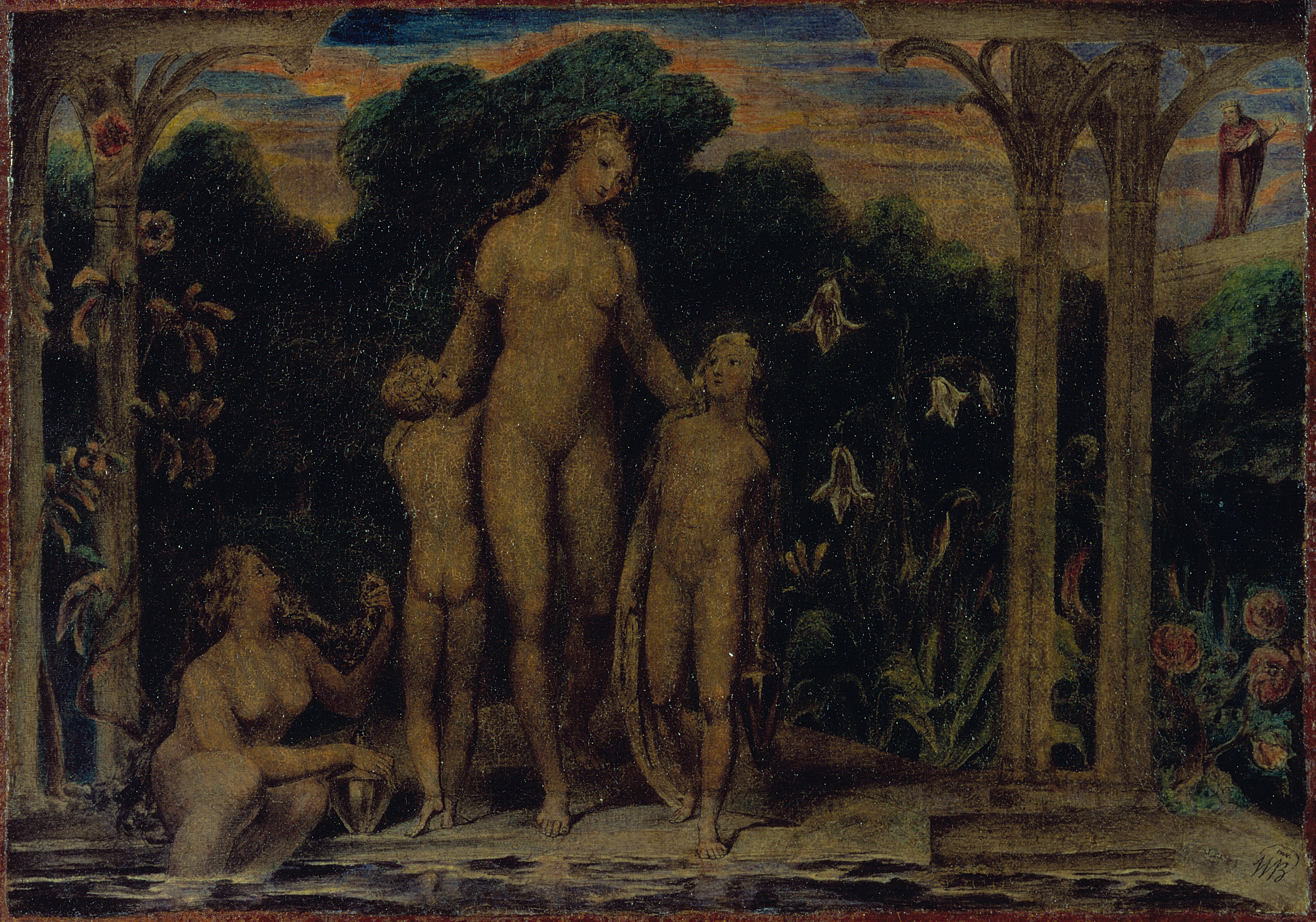
William Blake's painting Bathsheba at the Bath, Tate Britain

Several scholars see Bathsheba as the granddaughter of Ahitophel, as do passages in the Talmud. The argument is that she is called the daughter of Eliam in 2 Sam. 11:3, and 2 Sam 23:34 mentions an Eliam, the son of Ahithophel the Gilonite, one of David's "thirty". The assumption is then that these two Eliams are the same person.

However, in 1 Chronicles the names are very different: Bathsheba is called Bathshua the daughter of Ammiel in 1 Chronicles 3:5. And in the list of David's thirty in 1 Chronicles 11:36 we have Ahijah the Pelonite. Some have also questioned whether Ahithophel would have been old enough to have a granddaughter.

=== Rabbinic literature ===
Bathsheba was the granddaughter of Ahithophel, David's famous counselor. The Aggadah states that Ahithophel was misled by his knowledge of astrology into believing himself destined to become king of Israel. He therefore induced Absalom to commit an unpardonable crime (2 Sam. 16:21), which sooner or later would have brought with it, according to Jewish law, the penalty of death; the motive for this advice being to remove Absalom, and thus to make a way for himself to the throne. His astrological information had been, however, misunderstood by him; for in reality it only predicted that his granddaughter, Bathsheba, the daughter of his son Eliam, would become queen.

Bath-sheba, the granddaughter of Ahithophel, David's famous counselor was much younger than David.

The influence of the evil tempter of humanity brought about the sinful relation of David and Bathsheba. The Midrash portrays the influence of Satan bringing about the sinful relation of David and Bathsheba as follows: Bath-sheba was making her bathing on the roof of her house behind a screen of wickerwork, when Satan came in the disguise of a bird; David, shooting at it, struck the screen, splitting it; thus Bathsheba was revealed in her beauty to David (ib. 107a). Bath-sheba was providentially destined from the Creation to become in due time the legitimate wife of David; but this relation was immaturely precipitated, and thus he became Bath-sheba's partner in sin (ib.).

According to rabbinic tradition, when Bath-sheba saw the attempted crowning of Adonijah, she teamed up with the prophet Nathan to ensure Solomon's role as David's successor. At that juncture, she gained an audience with the king (who was consorting with Abishag in his old age and had been presumed impotent). During this meeting, the king engaged in 13 acts of intercourse with Bath-sheba before affirming his decision that her son Solomon should succeed him. The significance of that exact number of coituses and the meaning of their multi-coital encounter has been discussed in modern Biblical scholarship.

Bath-sheba is praised for her share in the successful effort to secure the succession to Solomon. Thus the verse in Eccl. iv. 9, "Two are better than one," is applied to David and Bath-sheba; while "the threefold cord" which shall not be quickly broken (ib. verse 12) is applied to the activity of Nathan the prophet, who joined in the effort (Eccl. R. iv. 9).

== Christianity ==
In Matthew 1 (Matthew 1:6), "the wife of Uriah" is mentioned as one of the ancestors of Jesus.

In medieval typology, Bathsheba is recognized as the antetype foreshadowing the role of Ecclesia, the church personified, as David was the antetype for Jesus. As a queen and mother, she was also associated with the Blessed Virgin Mary as Queen of Heaven. Bathsheba's son, King Solomon, rises to greet her, bows down in veneration, and furnishes her a seat at his right hand. This demonstrates her exalted status and share in the royal kingdom. Bathsheba acts as intercessor for her subjects, delivering their petitions to the King: "Pray ask King Solomon—he will not refuse you—to give me Abishag the Shunammite as my wife".

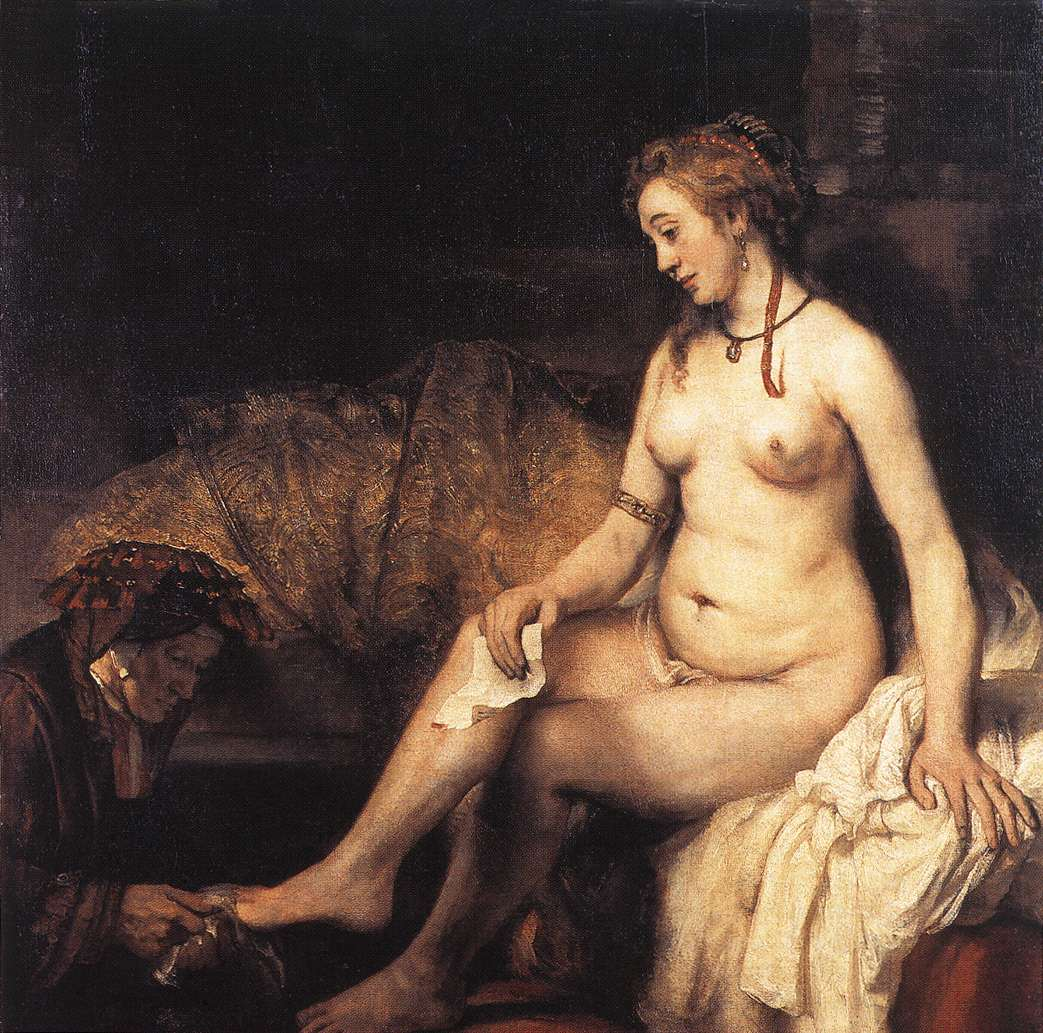
Bathsheba at Her Bath by Rembrandt

Bathsheba (Barsabeh, Bathsabeh) is venerated in the Ethiopian Orthodox Tewahedo Church as a saint. Her feast day is 27 November (01 Tahsas).

== Islam ==
In Islam, David is considered to be a prophet; Bathsheba is not mentioned in the Quran, and some Islamic tradition views the Bible story as incompatible with the principle of infallibility (Ismah) of the prophets. A hadith quoted in Tafsir al-Kabir and Majma' al-Bayan expresses that Ali ibn Abi Talib said: "Whoever says that David, has married Uriah's wife as the legends are narrate, I will punish him twice: one for qazf (falsely accusing someone of adultery) and the other for desecrating the prophethood (defamation of prophet David)".

Another hadith narrated from Shia scholars states that Ali Al-Ridha, during the discussions with the scholars of other religions about prophets' infallibility, asked one of them, "What do you say about David?" he said "David was praying, when a beautiful bird appeared in front of him, and David left his prayer and went after the bird. While David was walking on the roof of his palace, he saw Bathsheba having a bath... so David placed her husband in the front lines of the battlefield, in order to get killed, so that he could marry Bathsheba." Ali Al-Ridha got upset and said: "Inna Lillahi wa inna ilaihi raji'un, you assign sluggishness in prayer to the prophet of God, and then accuse him of unchastity, and then charge him with the murder of an innocent man!" He asked "so what is the story of Uriah?" and Ali Al-Ridha said "At that time, women whose husbands passed away or got killed in the war would never get married again (and this was the source of many evils). David was the first person to break this tradition. So after Uriah was incidentally killed in the war, David married his wife, but people could hardly accept this anomalous marriage (and subsequently legends were made about this marriage.)

== Critical commentary ==
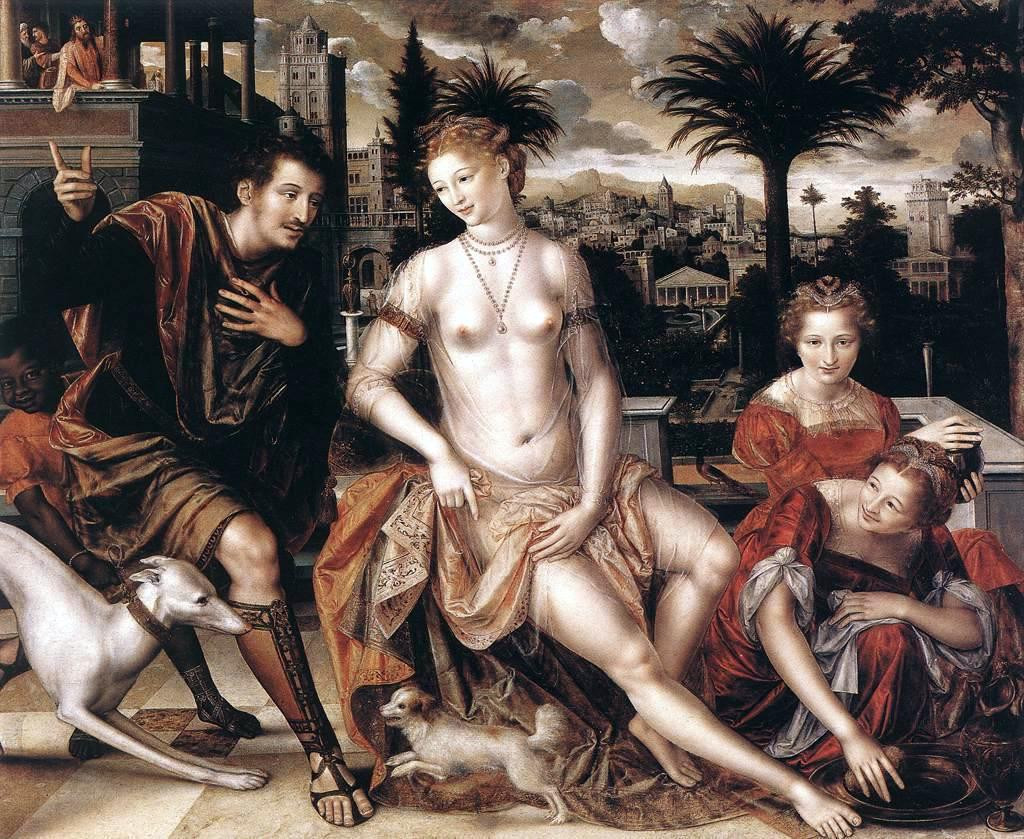
Bathsheba with David's messenger, as the king watches from his roof, 1562 Jan Massys

Bathsheba's name appears in 1 Chronicles 3:5 spelled "Bath-shua", a variant reading of "Bath-sheba". The passage in which Bath-sheba is mentioned is 2 Samuel 11:2–12:24, which is part of the oldest stratum of the book of Samuel, part court history of David, written by someone who stood very near the events and who did not idealise David. The material contained in it is of higher historical value than that in the later strata of these books. Budde later connected it with the Jahwist document of the Hexateuch.

The only interpolations that concern the story of Bathsheba are some verses in the early part of the twelfth chapter, that heighten the moral tone of Nathan's rebuke of David. According to Karl Budde the interpolated portion is 12: 7, 8, and 10–12; according to Friedrich Schwally and H. P. Smith, the whole of 12: 1–15a is an interpolation, and 12:. 15b should be joined directly to 11: 27. This does not directly affect the narrative concerning Bathsheba herself. 1 Chronicles omits all reference to the way in which Bathsheba became David's wife, and gives only the names of her children in 1 Chronicles 3:5—Shimea, Shobab, Nathan, and Solomon.

The father of Bathsheba was Eliam ("Ammiel" in 1 Chronicles 3:5). As this was also the name of a son of Ahithophel, one of David's heroes (2 Samuel 23:34), perhaps Bathsheba was a granddaughter of Ahithophel and that the latter's desertion of David at the time of Absalom's rebellion was in revenge for David's conduct toward Bathsheba.

Kenneth E. Bailey interprets the passage from a different perspective: he says that David's Jerusalem was tightly packed and Bathsheba's house may have been as close as twenty feet away from David's rooftop; people in ancient times were exceptionally modest about their bodies, so he suggests that Bathsheba displayed herself deliberately, so that instead of being an innocent victim, it was actually she who seduced David in order to rid herself of Uriah, and move in with King David.

David summoned Bathsheba for sex. Lawrence O. Richards states that the biblical text supports the innocence of Bathsheba, that David took the initiative to find out her identity and summon her, and that she was alone at the time and had no way to refuse the requests of a King. David J. Zucker writes that "[s]he is a victim of 'power rape'". Andrew J. Schmutzer stated that "David's 'taking' Bathsheba makes him responsible for her coming to him." Antony F. Campbell states "The 'violation of Bathsheba' may be the least unsatisfactory terminology, especially given the ambivalence of the text's storytelling." According to Michael D. Coogan, the faulting of David is made clear in the text from the very beginning: "It was springtime, the time when kings go forth to war... but David remained in Jerusalem" (2 Samuel 11:1); if David had been away at war, the incident would not have taken place.

The Bathsheba incident leads to a shift in the book's perspective; afterwards David "is largely at the mercy of events rather than directing them". He is no longer able to control his family, and ends up being overthrown by Absalom. And in 2 Samuel 13 the story of David's son Amnon's rape of his sister Tamar, told so soon after the incident of Bathsheba, seems to draw a parallel between the sexual misconduct of father and son.

== Depiction in arts and culture ==
=== Art – Bathsheba in her bath ===
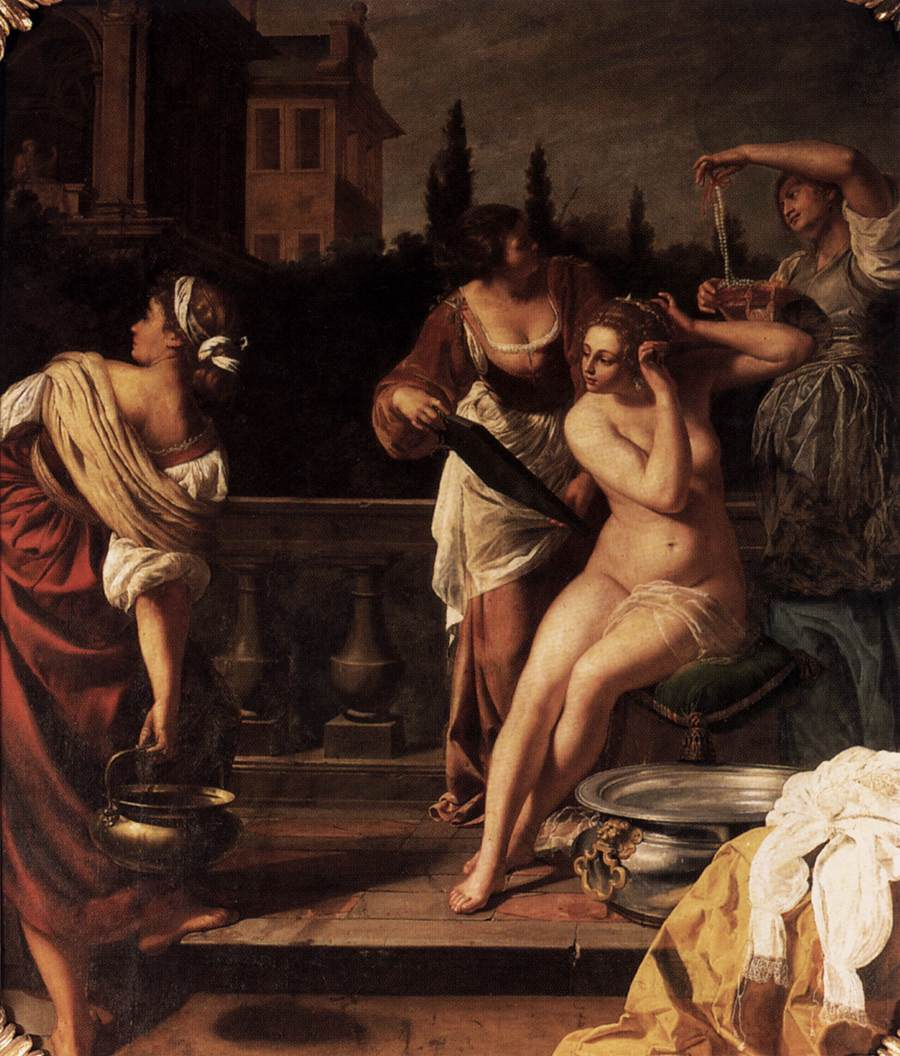
Painting by Artemisia Gentileschi (more in Commons).

Along with Eve, Bathsheba was almost the only female whose nude depiction could easily and regularly be justified in Christian art, and she is therefore an important figure in the development of the nude in medieval art. Though sometimes shown clothed at other points in her story, the most common depiction, in both medieval and later art, was Bathsheba at her Bath, the formal name for the subject in art showing Bathsheba bathing, watched by King David. This could be shown with various degrees of nudity, depending on the pose and the placing of clothes or towels. One of the most common placements in the 15th century, perhaps surprisingly, was in miniatures illustrating a book of hours, a personal prayer book, that overtook the psalter as the most popular devotional book for laypeople. This was especially the case in France.

In art the subject is one of the most commonly shown in the Power of Women topos. As an opportunity to feature a large female nude as the focus of a history painting, the subject was popular from the Renaissance onwards. Sometimes Bathsheba's maids or the "messengers" sent by David are shown, and often a distant David watching from his roof. The messengers are sometimes confused with David himself, but most artists follow the Bible in keeping David at a distance in this episode.

Paintings with articles include:

- Bathsheba, Hans Memling, c. 1485
- Bathsheba at Her Bath (Rembrandt), Louvre, the most famous painting of the subject.
- Bathsheba at her Bath (Veronese), 1575, Musée des Beaux-Arts de Lyon, France. Atypically, Bathsheba is clothed in this.
- Bathsheba at the Fountain, Rubens, c. 1635. Bathsheba receives David's letter
- Bathsheba (painting), Artemisia Gentileschi (and Viviano Codazzi, Domenico Gargiulo, 1637
- Bathsheba at her Bath (Ricci), 1720s, Museum of Fine Arts, Budapest
- Bathsheba at Her Bath (Hayez), 1834, Pinacoteca di Brera, Milan

=== Literature ===
- 1588 David and Bethsabe, a play by George Peele
- 1874 The story of Bathsheba, David and Uriah is echoed in Thomas Hardy's novel Far from the Madding Crowd.
- 1893 The Sherlock Holmes story The Adventure of the Crooked Man uses the David/Bathsheba story as its main structure.
- 1984 The tragicomedic novel God Knows written by Joseph Heller. Narrated by king David, purports to be his deathbed memoirs; however, not recounted in a straightforward fashion, the storyline is often hilariously fractured, exploring David's childhood herding sheep, the prophet Samuel, Goliath, King Saul, Jonathan (and homosexual innuendoes), Bathsheba and Uriah, the Psalms, the treachery of Absalom, Solomon, with even the occasional display of David betraying a knowledge of the future and Heaven.
- 2000 The biblical commentary anthology Really Bad Girls of the Bible by Liz Curtis Higgs contains a contemporary-setting story based on the first part of 2 Samuel 11, then discusses the biblical story in the following commentary segment.
- 2011 Jill Eileen Smith's Bathsheba: A Novel (The Wives of King David),
- 2015 The life of King David, as narrated by the prophet Nathan, and including the story of Uriah and Bathsheba, is the subject of the novel The Secret Chord by Geraldine Brooks.
- 2015 Angela Hunt's Bathsheba: Reluctant Beauty (A Dangerous Beauty Novel)
- 2018 Jenifer Jennings's A Stolen Wife
- 2019 Francine River's A Lineage of Grace
- 2020 Elizabeth Cook's novel Lux compares David and Bathsheba to Henry VIII and Anne Boleyn through the eyes of Thomas Wyatt.
- 2022 Amanda Bedzrah's novel Becoming Queen Bathsheba

=== Film ===
Bathsheba has been portrayed by:

- Susan Hayward in the 1951 film David and Bathsheba
- Maruchi Fresno in the 1959 film Solomon and Sheba
- Rosalind Elias in the TV premier of Ezra Laderman's opera/cantata And David Wept (1971)
- Jane Seymour in the 1976 TV film The Story of David (1976)
- Alice Krige in the 1985 film King David
- Anouk Aimée in the 1997 TV film Solomon
- Melia Kreiling in the 2013 TV miniseries The Bible
- Moriah Smallbone in the 2017 series The Chosen

=== Musical ===
- David and Bathsheba (who is unnamed) are referenced in the Leonard Cohen song "Hallelujah" (released 1985) ("you saw her bathing on the roof, her beauty in the moonlight overthrew you").
- Bathsheba, David, and Uriah are referenced in the Bastille song Bathsheba & Him (released 2025)
- Sting says that his song "Mad About You" is about the story of David and Bathsheba.
- Pixies singer Frank Black stated in an 1989 interview with NME that the song "Dead" off the Doolittle album is about the story of David and Bathsheba.

== See also ==
- King Lemuel, perhaps connected to Bathsheba
- Susanna (Book of Daniel), also spied on while bathing
