= Uriah the Hittite =

Character in the Hebrew Bible

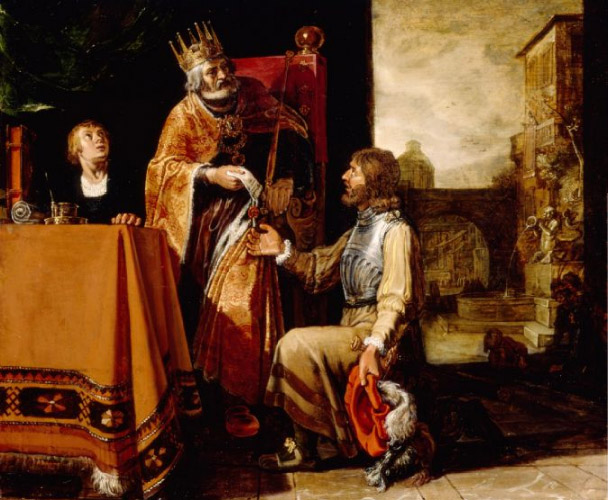
Pieter Lastman, David handing over a letter to Uriah, 1619.

Uriah the Hittite (Biblical Hebrew: אוּרִיָּה הַחִתִּי, romanized: ʾŪrīyyā haḤīttī) is a minor figure in the Hebrew Bible, mentioned in the Books of Samuel and the Books of Kings, an elite soldier in the army of David, king of Israel and Judah, and the first husband of Bathsheba, the daughter of Eliam. While Uriah was serving in David's army abroad, David, from the roof of his palace, looked down on his city and spied upon Bathsheba bathing in the privacy of her courtyard. Moved by lust at the sight of her, David called for Bathsheba to be brought to him and slept with her, impregnating her. To hide his misdeeds, David called Uriah home from war, hoping he and Bathsheba would sleep together and that he could pass the child off as Uriah's. However, Uriah, being a disciplined soldier, refused to visit his wife. So David murdered him by proxy by ordering all of Uriah's comrades to abandon him in the midst of battle, so that he ended up getting killed by an opposing army. Following Uriah's death, David took Bathsheba as his eighth wife.

== Biblical account ==
=== Name ===
The name Uriah was of uncertain origin. Early on it was suggested to be of Hebrew origin, a theophoric name referencing Yahweh, meaning "the LORD (Yahweh) is my light". Later several possible sources from Anatolian languages have been suggested until in 2018 it was identified as a probable loan from Luwian uriia- "commander".

Based on the Biblical account, Uriah was likely of the ethnic Hittite minority living in Israel that had lived in and around the region, "the Land of Canaan", since before the time of Abraham. The Hebrews upon their entry into Canaan had been commanded (Deuteronomy 20:16–17) to kill "anything that breathes ... in the cities of the nations the Lord your God is giving you as an inheritance," with the explanation that "otherwise, they will teach you to follow all the detestable things they do in worshiping their gods, and you will sin against the Lord your God" (Deuteronomy 20:18). Even so, some of the earlier inhabitants were spared, in some cases for cooperating with the Hebrews (Joshua 2:12–14, 6:23, Judges 1:24–25) in other cases from failure to carry out the extermination order (Joshua 15:63, 16:10, Judges 1:19, 21, 27–36).

The era of David's rule was generations after this time and by his day, many residents of non-Israelite descent who followed the Israelite religion had come to be accepted as Israelites, Uriah might have been among these. In addition, his status as an officer in the army and as one of David's "mighty men" would indicate acceptance within the ethnic community.

The Talmud states two opinions as to who Uriah was: 1) He was a convert to Judaism. 2) He lived among Hittites and so is known as a Hittite despite his being born Jewish. (Kiddushin 76b) Either way, he was not actually part of the Hittite nation because he would have been forbidden to marry Bathsheba had he been a Gentile.

=== David's Mighty Warriors ===
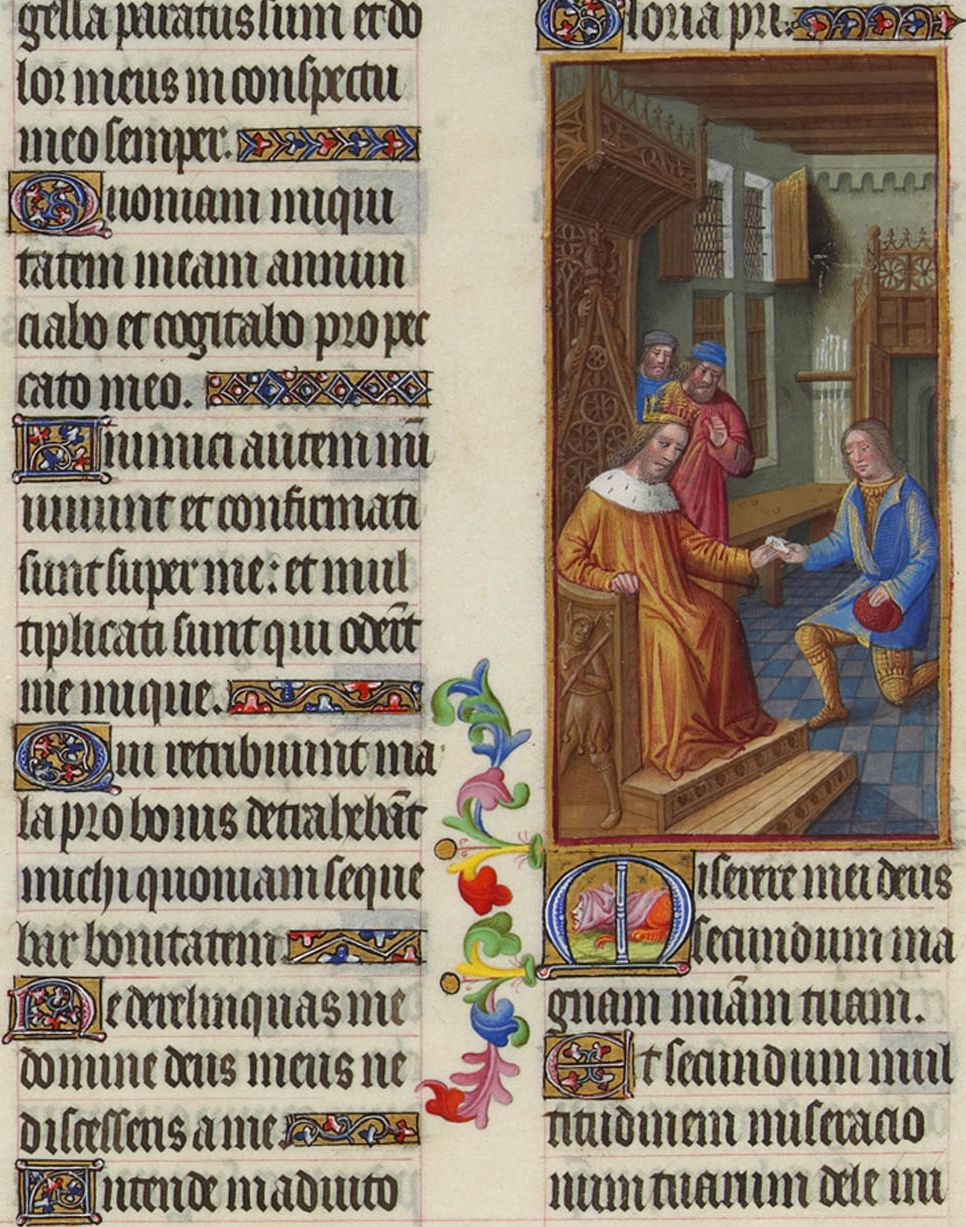
"David Entrusts a Letter to Uriah." In the Musée Condé, Chantilly.

David's mighty men were a group of his best 37 fighters (later expanded to around 80). Although the lists of his mighty men (2 Samuel 23:8–39 & 1 Chronicles 11:10–47) are given after David has become king, many of them may have been the loyal followers who stayed with him when he was fleeing King Saul. At the very least, they fought side by side with him. Uriah's closeness to David is illustrated by how closely he lived to the palace, and his position as one of the mighty men at the front battle lines allowed David to formulate and carry out his plot.

=== David and Bathsheba ===
According to Second Samuel, King David was tempted upon seeing Bathsheba bathe in her courtyard from the roof of his palace. He had her brought to his chambers and had sex with her, resulting in a pregnancy. Informed that her husband was Uriah, David summoned Uriah from battle to meet him, suggesting that he go home and "wash his feet," meaning to spend time at home and attend to his wife.

Uriah refused, claiming a code of honor with his fellow warriors while they were in battle. It was common for warriors in preparation for battle to abstain from sex, as a practice of discipline. After Uriah repeatedly refused to see his wife Bathsheba, David sent him to his commanding officer Joab with a letter that ordered Joab to put Uriah on the front lines of the battle and have the other soldiers move away from him so that he would be killed by enemy soldiers.

Despite Uriah's status as one of David's mighty men, British rabbi Jonathan Magonet observes that Uriah refers to Joab, not David, as "my lord (or commander)" (2 Samuel 11:11). Joab is, Magonet notes, a kingmaker who dispatches ruthlessly his own military rivals, Abner and Amasa. He is sufficiently powerful that David, on his deathbed, advises Solomon to arrange his death (1 Kings 2:5–6). This statement prompts Magonet to speculate that David saw some deeper political threat from Joab through his entanglement with Uriah's wife.

=== Nathan's prophecy ===
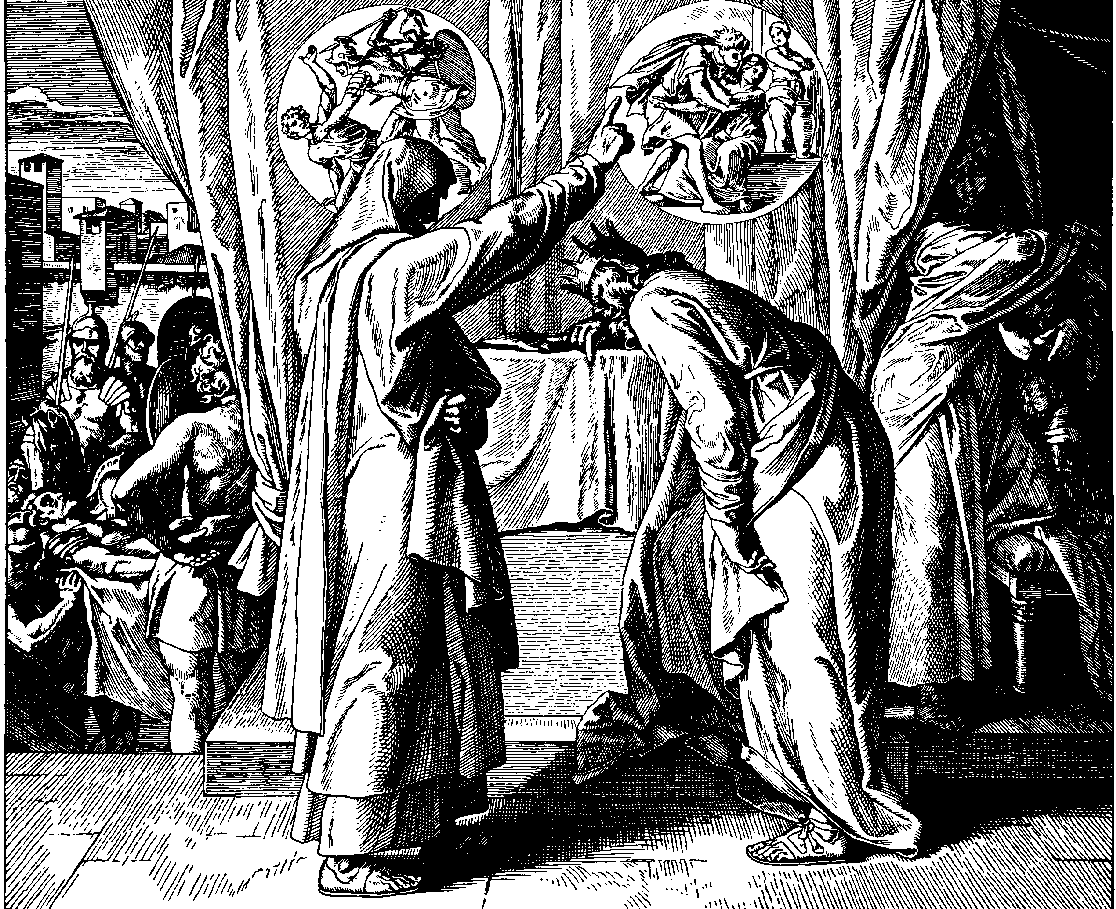
Nathan Confronts David, 1860 woodcut by Julius Schnorr von Karolsfeld

The prophet Nathan soon after confronted David about this murder, by first telling him a parable of a rich man and a poor man: The rich man had many sheep, while the poor man had only one little ewe, whom he cared for greatly. A traveler approached the rich man for food, whereby the man took the poor man's ewe and dressed it to give to the traveler.

Hearing this story, David grew angry and replied: "As surely as the Lord lives, the man who did this deserves to die! He must pay for that lamb four times over, because he did such a thing and had no pity."

Nathan replied, "You are the man! This is what the Lord, the God of Israel, says: 'I anointed you king over Israel, and I delivered you from the hand of Saul. I gave your master's house to you, and your master's wives into your arms. I gave you the house of Israel and Judah.

"And if all this had been too little, I would have given you even more. Why did you despise the word of the Lord by doing what is evil in His eyes? You struck down Uriah the Hittite with the sword and took his wife to be your own.

"You killed him with the sword of the Ammonites. Now, therefore, the sword will never depart from your house, because you despised Me and took the wife of Uriah the Hittite to be your own.'" NIV - Bible Gateway passage: 2 Samuel 12:5-10 - New International Version

Nathan then informs David that his child with Bathsheba must die. Indeed, their first child dies after seven days. David and Bathsheba later had a second son, the future King Solomon.

== Rabbinic literature ==
Because, as the Jewish Encyclopedia notes, the Rabbis "could not admit the existence of any flaw in David's character," their writings tend to paint Uriah as the one at fault: They contended that when he defied David's order to go home, he disregarded a royal bidding (Shab. 56a; Tos. to Ḳid. 43a, above).

== Biblical texts mentioning Uriah the Hittite ==
All references from the JPS translation (1917) unless otherwise stated.

- 2 Samuel 23:8–39: These be the names of the mighty men whom David had: [...] 39: Uriah the Hittite: thirty and seven in all.
- 1 Chronicles 11:10–11:41: These also are the chief of the mighty men whom David had, who strengthened themselves with him in his kingdom, and with all Israel, to make him king, according to the word of the LORD concerning Israel. [...] 41: Uriah the Hittite, Zabad the son of Ahlai,
- 2 Samuel 11:3–4: And David sent and inquired after the woman. And one said, Is not this Bath-sheba, the daughter of Eliam, the wife of Uriah the Hittite? 4: And David sent messengers, and took her; and she came in unto him, and he lay with her; for she was purified from her uncleanness: and she returned unto her house. ["Uriah the Hittite" named four more times in this chapter.]
- 2 Samuel 12:9–10: [Nathan:] Wherefore hast thou despised the commandment of the LORD, to do evil in his sight? thou hast killed Uriah the Hittite with the sword, and hast taken his wife to be thy wife, and hast slain him with the sword of the children of Ammon. 10: Now therefore the sword shall never depart from thine house; because thou hast despised me, and hast taken the wife of Uriah the Hittite to be thy wife.
- 1 Kings 15:5: Because David did that which was right in the eyes of the LORD, and turned not aside from any thing that he commanded him all the days of his life, save only in the matter of Uriah the Hittite.
- Matthew 1:6 (NAB): As the first husband of the mother of Solomon (i.e., Bathsheba) in the genealogy of Jesus.

== Film portrayals ==
Uriah is portrayed in the American films David and Bathsheba (1951) by Kieron Moore, King David (1985) by James Lister and Mark Burnett's and Roma Downey's The Bible: The Epic Miniseries (2013) by Dhaffer L'Abidine.

== Sources ==
- Uriah in The Jewish Encyclopedia
