= Marie-Jo Thiel =

French ethics academic (born 1957)

- Born: 7 May 1957 (age 69); Etting, Moselle, France
- Occupations: Theologian, professor, doctor, ethicist, author

Marie-Jo Thiel (born 7 May 1957, Etting) is a French theologian, medical doctor, and professor of ethics. She is a professor of moral theology, specialising in ethics and bioethics, at the University of Strasbourg. Her research focuses on topics such as ageing, death, medical ethics, and sexual abuse in the Catholic Church. She is also the founder and former director of the European Centre for Studies and Research in Ethics and former president of the European Society for Catholic Theology.

== Biography ==
Thiel was born on 7 May 1957 in Etting, Moselle, France. She studied Medicine at the University of Strasbourg and became an intern at the Roman Catholic Diocese of Nancy in 1980. She obtained her PhD in medicine in 1983 from Strasbourg, followed by a PhD in Catholic Theology from the University of Metz in 1989. Her second doctoral thesis was called "Au clair obscur de la vie : pour un statut de l'embryon humain" (In the chiaroscuro of life: Status of the human embryo). This was given très honorable avec félicitations by the jury. She then began teaching ethics and bioethics at Metz and Nancy; at Metz, she became a maître de conférence. While a lecturer, she finished a diploma in European Health Policies in 1993 at the Seminary in Nancy, followed by a Habilitation in Ethics and Moral Theology at University of Strasbourg in 1998. Her habilitation thesis was called "Atouts de l'éthique systématique" (Assets of Systematic Ethics), which would inform her academic focus moving forward.

== Career ==
Thiel joined the Faculty of Catholic Theology at Strasbourg in 1999, where she quickly established an interdisciplinary program in ethics. A master's degree in ethics was also started, with her serving as director. This research formed the basis for the European Centre for Studies and Research in Ethics (CEERE), which she founded in 2005 in connection to Strasbourg's Faculty of Social Sciences.

Her contacts and research activities in collaboration with Yale University in the United States led Thiel to begin a summer school on interdisciplinary European Ethics in the summer of 2013. The summer school drew 41 students from 22 countries over five continents.

Thiel has been studying sexual abuse in the Catholic Church since the 1990s. Her work as a physician and a theologian meant she was approached by sexual abuse victims; this inspired her to look more deeply at the issue. In 2017, her work led Pope Francis to appoint her a member of the Pontifical Academy for Life as part of the organisation's reform. New statues were introduced to change the lifetime membership into 5-year renewable terms, and to allow appointments to people regardless of religion. She has also advised the French Episcopal Conference for more than 20 years in its efforts to fight sexual abuse within the Church. In 2018, she published a 700-page, in-depth study on sexual abuse of minors within the Catholic Church. This book is called The Catholic Church facing sexual abuse and was published by Bayard Presse. Throughout her studies, she has stressed the importance of supporting and believing victims of sexual abuse, and uses their accounts in her writing.

Thiel started the Journées Internationales d'Ethique (International Symposium on Ethics) in Strasbourg in about 2008. She also edits the CEERE newsletter. In addition to her books, she has published articles in several international journals. Thiel teaches and writes in English, German, and French. Though she mainly teaches in France, she has also taught in the United States, Canada, and Germany.

Throughout her work at the intersection of ethics and the Church, she has stepped forward to share her beliefs: she has criticised the Church's ban on contraceptives and classifying homosexuality as a sin, and supported vaccines to help prevent the COVID-19 pandemic. Thiel believes the Church has to be adaptive in the face of changing issues and firmly believes the Church does not intend to be "behind the times." She has also expressed support for assisted suicide, for which she was criticised by other Pontifical Academy members.

== Honours and awards ==
Year	Award	Issuing body	Notes	Ref
2003	Maurice Rapin Prize		Book: Où va la médecine ? Sens des représentations et pratiques médicales	
2008	Teaching Ethics in France trophy	European Centre for Studies and Research in Ethics	This was the first time this honour had been awarded	
2013	Légion d'honneur Knighthood	President of France	Awarded at the Palais Universitaire by Hubert Haenel	
2022	Honorary doctorate in Theology	University of Fribourg	In recognition of her studies on sexual abuse within the Catholic Church	

== Memberships ==
Organization	Membership year	Position (yrs)	Notes	Ref
Association Herrade de Landsberg. About Ethics in Alsace		President		
Association of Theologians for the Study of Morality	2000	Vice-President (2000-?)		
Committee of the Wise, Regional Experts Committee	2008	Member (2008-2011)		
Ethics Research Group of the Hospital Team of Saint Vincent (Strasbourg)		Member		
Ethics Committee of the Faculty of Medicine, University of Strasbourg		Member		
European Democracy Forum		Member		
European Group of Ethics for Sciences and New Technologies	2011	Member (2011-2016)	Nominated by the European Commission	
European Society for Catholic Theology - Europe		Member		
European Society for Catholic Theology - France	2015	Vice-President (2015-2017), President (2017-2019)		
French Catholic Academy		Member		
French Society of Thoracic and Cardiovascular Surgery Ethics Committee	2010	Member (2010-?)		
Hospital and University Department of Medical Ethics, University of Strasbourg		Vice-President		
Institute of Social Liaisons		Member		
Orientation Council of the Regional Space for Ethical Reflection in Alsace, France		Member		
Pontifical Academy for Life	2017	Member (2017-2022, 2022-2027)	Appointed by Pope Francis	
Regional Observatory Agency for the Quality of Hospital Facilities		Member		
Societas Ethica	2006	Member		
Society of Friends of the University Academy of Strasbourg		Member		
Supervisory Board of the Regional Agency for Health in Alsace	2010	Member (2010-2014, 2015-2019)		

== Selected publications ==
- 1992: Avancer en vie. Le troisième âge. ISBN 2220033864
- 1999: Pratiquer l'analyse éthique. Étudier un cas, examiner un texte. with X. Thévenot. ISBN 9782204062497
- 2006: Entre malheur et espoir. Annoncer le handicap, la maladie, la mort. ISBN 2868202926
- 2009: Donner, recevoir un organe. Droit, dû, devoir. ISBN 2868203868
- 2010: Quand la vie naissante se termine. ISBN 9782868204523
- 2011: Semences de vie. Trente ans d’expérience en assistance médicale à la procréation with André Clavert. ISBN 9782868204691
- 2012: Ethical Challenges of Ageing. ISBN 9781853159787
- 2013: Au nom de la dignité de l'être humain. ISBN 978-2227486263
- 2014: La santé augmentée : réaliste ou totalitaire? ISBN 9782227487444
- 2016: Souhaitable vulnérabilité? ISBN 9782868205315
- 2019: L'église catholique face aux abus sexuels sur mineurs. ISBN 9782227496033
- 2022: Abus sexuels – Ecouter, enquêter, prévenir with Anne Danion-Grilliat and Frederic Trautmann. ISBN 9782868207623
- 2023: Laure Blanchon, Isabelle de La Garanderie, Véronique Margron, Anne-Marie Pelletier, Lucetta Scaraffia, Anne Soupa et Marie-Jo Thiel. Se réformer ou mourir. Sept théologiennes prennent la parole sur l'avenir de l'Église. Paris, Salvator, 2023. EAN 9782706724152
- 2023: Plus forts, car vulnérables. Ce que nous apprennent les abus dans l’Église. Suivi d’un dialogue avec Patrick C. Goujon. Paris, Salvator, 2023. Traduction anglais en cours pour Wipf and Stok Publishers. EAN 9782706723780
- 2024: C. Casalone, M. Chiodi, R. Dell’Oro, P.D. Guenzi, A.-M. Pelletier, P. Sequeri, M.-J. Thiel, A. Thomasset, La Gioa della Vita. Un percorso di etica teologica : Scrittura, tradizione, sfide pratiche. Introduzione di V. Paglia, Roma, Libreria Editrice Vaticana, 2024 ISBN 978-8826608501.
- 2024: C. Casalone, M. Chiodi, R. Dell’Oro, P.D. Guenzi, A.-M. Pelletier, P. Sequeri, M.-J. Thiel, A. Thomasset, La joie de la vie. Un parcours d’éthique théologique : Écriture, tradition, défis pratiques, Introduction V. Paglia, Paris, Ed. Salvator, 2024. ISBN 978-2706726927
- 2024: C. Casalone, M. Chiodi, R. Dell’Oro, P.D. Guenzi, A.-M. Pelletier, P. Sequeri, M.-J. Thiel, A. Thomasset, La Alegría de Vivir. Un camino de ética teológica : Escritura, Tradición y desafíos prácticos. Introducción de V. Paglia, San Pablo & Libreria Editrice Vaticana, 2024. ISBN 978-8428571142
- 2024: La grâce et la pesanteur. Le célibat obligatoire des prêtres en question. Paris, DDB, 2024. EAN 9782220098579 (traduction italienne en cours pour Ed. Queriniana).
- 2025 : Laure Blanchon, Isabelle de La Garanderie, Véronique Margron, Anne-Marie Pelletier, Lucetta Scaraffia, Anne Soupa et Marie-Jo Thiel, Reform or Die. Seven Women Theologians Speak, New York / Mahwah, NJ, Paulist Press, 2025. Marie-Jo Thiel, “Women in the Church: From Guardianship to Empowerment”
- 2025 : Académie Pontificale pour la Vie, Le Petit lexique de la fin de vie, traduction (depuis l'italien) et présentation-adaptation au public français, Marie-Jo Thiel et Agata Zielinski. Paris, Salvator, 2025 EAN 9782706729669
