= Lieven (given name) =

Lieven is a Dutch language masculine given name. A Germanic name, it derives from Lief-win, meaning "dear friend" (lief / lieve still means "dear" in Dutch). The name was popular in the Low Countries through the Anglo-Saxon missionary Liafwin (Lieven in some sources and Latinized Lebuinus) who died around 775 in Deventer. Veneration of Saint Livinus of Ghent (supposedly c.580–657), who was probably invented in the 10th or 11th century and modeled after Lebuinus, made the name popular in Flanders and especially Ghent. Alternative spellings are Lieve, Lievin and the French-appearing Liévin. People with the name include:

- Lieven Bauwens (1769–1822), Flemish entrepreneur and industrial spy
- Lieven Ferdinand de Beaufort (1879–1968), Dutch biologist
- Lieven Bertels (born 1971), Belgian musicologist, impresario and festival curator
- Lieven Boeve (born 1966), Belgian Catholic theologian
- Lieven Willemsz van Coppenol (1598–1667), Dutch calligrapher portrayed by Rembrandt
- Lievin Cruyl (1634–bef.1720), Flemish priest, architect, designer and engraver
- Lieven De Cauter (born 1959), Belgian philosopher, art historian, and writer
- Liévin De Winne (1821–1880), Belgian portrait painter
- Lieven Dehandschutter (born 1958), Belgian N-VA politician
- Lieve Geelvinck (1676–1743), Dutch administrator of the Dutch East India Company, mayor of Amsterdam
- Lieven Gevaert (1868–1935), Belgian industrialist
- Lieven de Key (1560–1627), Dutch architect
- Lieven van Lathem (1430–1493), Flemish painter and manuscript illuminator
- Lieven Lemse (1505–1568), Dutch physician and author
- Liévin Lerno (1927–2017), Belgian cyclist
- Lieven Maesschalck (born 1964), Belgian physiotherapist
- Lieven Scheire (born 1981), Belgian comedian
- Lieve Verschuier (1627–1686), Dutch maritime painter
- Lieven de Witte (c.1503–aft.1578), Flemish painter and architect

== See also ==
- Lieven, surname of a noble family named after Livonia
- Jan Lievens (1607–1674), Dutch painter, son of Lieven Hendricx
- Lievens (surname), Dutch patronymic surname
- Liévin, a town in Northern France
