= Lieve =

Lieve is a Dutch language feminine name derived from the Godelieve ("dear to God"), a female 11th-century Flemish saint. The masculine given name is probably a form of Lieven. Both names contain the Germanic element "lief-" ("dear") and lief and lieve still retain that meaning in Dutch. People with the name include:

Feminine

- Lieve Fransen (born 1950), Belgian HIV/AIDS activist
- Lieve Joris (born 1953), Belgian non-fiction writer
- Lieve van Kessel (born 1977), Dutch field hockey player
- Lieve Maes (born 1960), Belgian N-VA politician
- Lieve Slegers (born 1965), Belgian long-distance runner
- Lieve Van Ermen (born 1948), Belgian politician and cardiologist
- Lieve Wierinck (born 1957), Belgian VLD politician and MEP

Masculine

- Lieve Geelvinck (1676–1743), Dutch administrator of the Dutch East India Company, mayor of Amsterdam
- Lieve Verschuier (1627–1686), Dutch maritime painter

== See also ==
- Lieve Hugo (1934–1975), stage name ("Dear Hugo") of the Surinamese singer J.T. Hugo Uiterloo
- Ons' Lieve Heer op Solder, 17th century canal house, house church, and museum in the city center of Amsterdam, Netherlands
- Onze Lieve Vrouweplein, square in the centre of Maastricht in The Netherlands
- Onze-Lieve-Vrouw ten Troost, simply known as the Troostkerk, is a basilica in Vilvoorde, Belgium
- Onze-Lieve-Vrouw-Waver, Belgian village roughly 10 km east of Mechelen
