= Ermen =

Ermen is a name and a surname. It may be a Turkish ethnonymic surname literally meaning "Armenian"

- Ermen Benítez (born 1961), Ecuadorian footballer
- Arzu Ermen (born 1968), German film and stage actress
- Lieve Van Ermen (born 1948), Flemish politician and cardiologist
- Hugh Ermen (1928–2009), British horticulturalist
- Reinhard Ermen (born 1954), German art critic, musicologist and publicist

== See also ==
- Ermeni
