= Bathsheba with King David's Letter =

1654 painting by Willem Drost

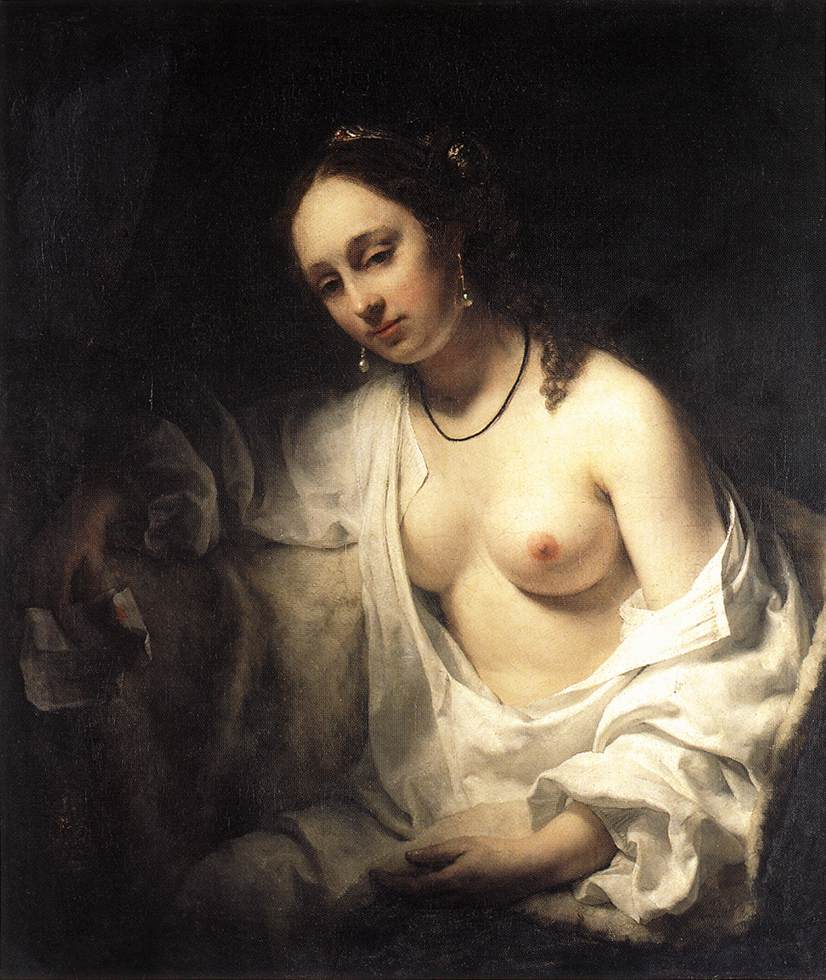

Bathsheba with David's Letter is a 1654 oil on canvas painting by Willem Drost, showing the Biblical character Bathsheba. It was produced just before the artist set out for Italy and at the same time as his teacher Rembrandt's Bathsheba at Her Bath - both works opt not to show King David witnessing her bathing but her receiving his letter afterwards, giving a more introspective feel focused on Bathsheba's psychological conflict over the adultery to which David invites her.

It is known to have been in the collection of Jean-Jacques-Joseph Leroy d'Etiolles, a renowned 19th-century surgeon, and then that of Louis Alfred Caroillon de Vandeul, mayor of Soisy-sur-Seine, who bequeathed it to the Louvre, where it still hangs.

== Analysis ==
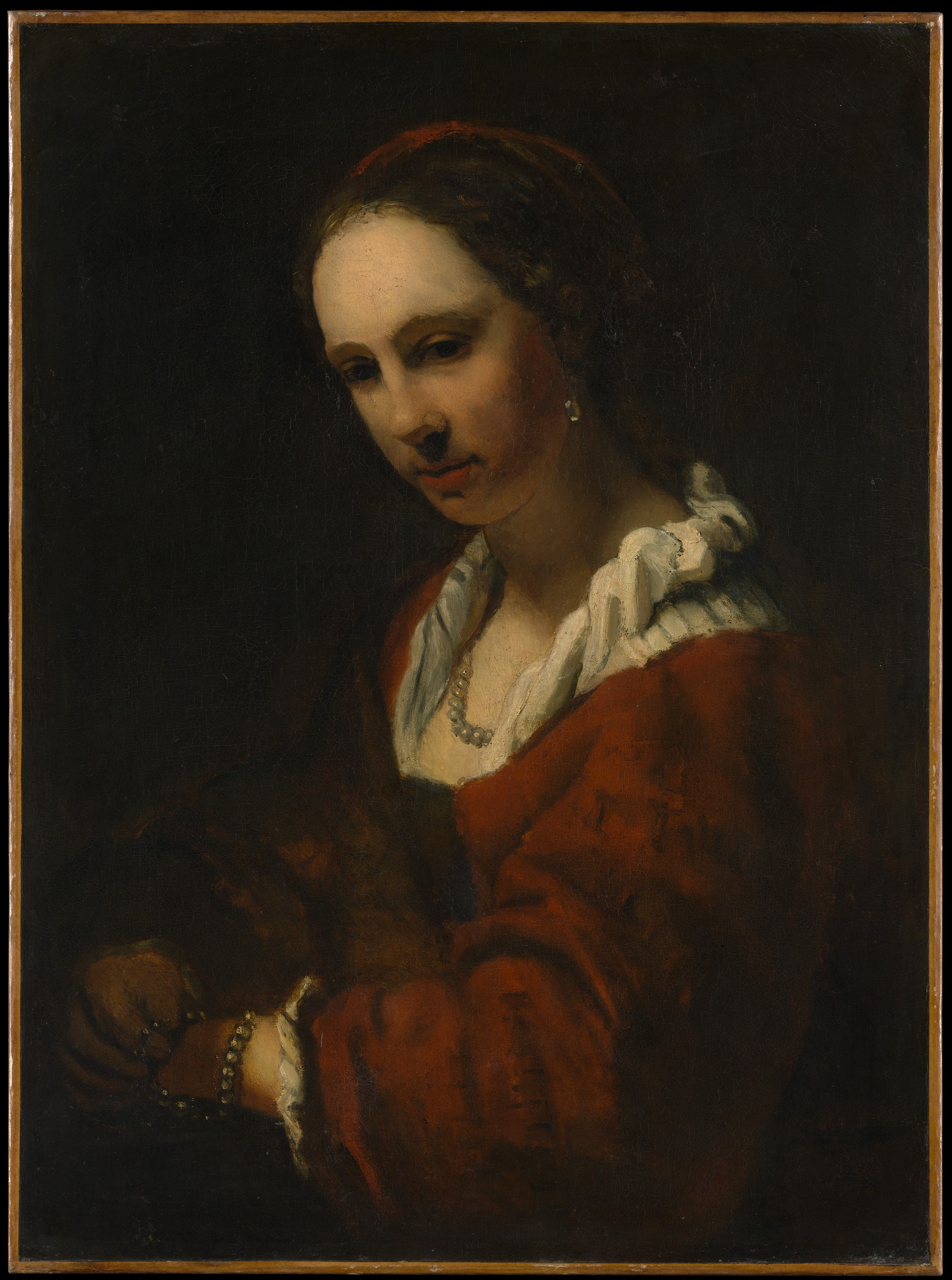
Young Woman with a Pearl Necklace after Drost (Metropolitan Museum of Art) - a copy of a work in Dresden showing the same woman as Bathsheba but previously thought to have shown Hendrickje Stoffels.

Many art historians hold it to be the painter's masterpiece, but others disagree - Wilhelm Valentiner called it sentimental, while Kunoth-Leifels considered it merely a pupil's attempt to imitate Rembrandt's introspective work which succeeded only as far as the limitations of Drost's technique allowed. Werner Sumowski and Bruno Fucard argue that Drost was not trying to imitate Rembrandt's intensely introspective Bathsheba, but rather to produce a more purely aesthetic work without retreating from his master's style.

Drost uses a smaller canvas than Bathsheba at Her Bath and bases the composition on an earlier 1643 depiction of Bathsheba by Rembrandt. He places her in a darker room than Rembrandt's 1645 treatment of the subject and only shows her upper body, but removes the background figures of the maids and limits his palette to just white, black and flesh tones. He uses strong chiaroscuro effects to highlight her whilst keeping the contrast even and her skin smooth. Indeed, Rembrandt's only direct influences are her seated pose, her holding the letter in the same hand and her wearing similar jewellery. The differences suggest Drost was influenced by Rembrandt but intended to take a more aesthetic approach than his master. The depiction of movement was important to Rembrandt and his pupils, as seen here in the tilt of the earrings, suggesting that Bathsheba is not standing still and gazing at the viewer, but is about to turn around.

The concentric circles formed by the curves of Bathsheba's arms, the most important and fundamental element of the work, resonate with the circular motifs and soft textures of her undergarment, black necklace and round breasts. Her circular pose draws on a portrait of a woman by Palma il Vecchio, previously in the Berlin Museums but now lost. The style of her upper body is also similar to Vecchio's A Blonde Woman and Titian's Flora, clearly reminding the viewer that Rembrandt (and through him Drost) was strongly influenced by Venetian painters through prints and (in the case of Flora) through a copy of the work then in a private Dutch collection. Drost's work is also similar to Rembrandt's c.1656 portrait of Hendrickje Stoffels, which itself was influenced by Vecchio. Even later Drost was influenced by Venetian art, painting his own Flora in the 1650s.

== Bibliography ==
- "Larry Silver, review of Jonathan Bikker, Willem Drost: A Rembrandt Pupil in Amsterdam and Venice, The Art Book, 2006".
