= Boeve =

Boeve is a surname. Notable people with the surname include:

- Henk Boeve (born 1957), Dutch racing cyclist
- Lieven Boeve (born 1966), Belgian Catholic theologian
- May Boeve, American environmental activist
- Mike Boeve (born 2002), American baseball player
- Peter Boeve (born 1957), Dutch footballer and coach
