= Young Woman in a Pearl Necklace (New York City) =

Painting by an unknown painter

Young Woman with a Pearl Necklace
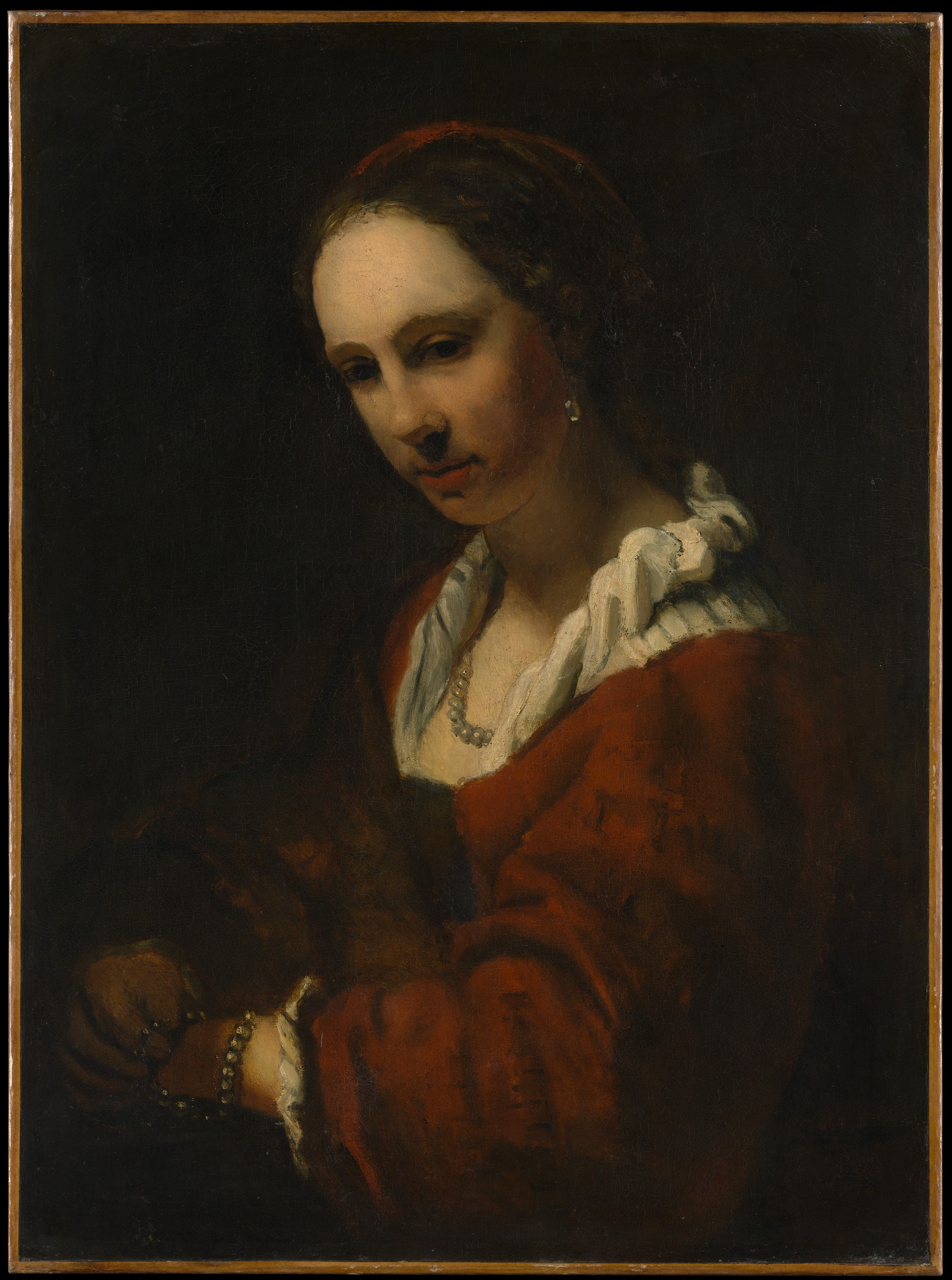
- Artist: Anonymous 17th-century artist after Willem Drost
- Year: after 1655
- Dimensions: 84.1 cm × 62.2 cm (33.1 in × 24.5 in)
- Location: Metropolitan Museum of Art; New York City
- Accession: 14.40.629
- Website: Metropolitan Museum of Art

Young Woman in a Pearl Necklace (after 1655) is an oil on canvas painting by an unknown painter, after a painting by the Dutch painter Willem Drost. It is an example of Dutch Golden Age painting and is part of the collection of the Metropolitan Museum of Art.

The woman is looking at the viewer and is wearing a red bodice that is slightly open to reveal a pearl necklace.

This painting was documented in 1914 by Hofstede de Groot as a Rembrandt. It had just been acquired the year before through the Benjamin Altman bequest and was considered one of the gems of the collection. Hofstede de Groot thought he saw a portrait of Rembrandt's wife Hendrickje Stoffels and wrote; "719. HENDRICKJE STOFFELS. Half-length. She sits, inclined to the right, bending her head and looking at the spectator. With the right hand she puts a string of pearls on her left wrist. Her red gown is cut out at the bosom, and the pleated chemisette is open; on her bare breast lies a pearl necklace. In the left ear, which is alone visible, is a pendant with a pearl. On her hair is a cap. Painted about 1658. A copy is in the Dresden Gallery, 1908 catalogue, No. 1591, as the work of Bernaert Fabritius. Mentioned by Hofstede de Groot, Onze Kunst, 1999, p. 181. In the possession of L. Lesser, London. In the possession of Duveen Brothers, London. In the collection of B. Altman, New York; bequeathed in 1913 to the Metropolitan Museum. In the Metropolitan Museum, New York. "

The Rembrandt attribution was not an invention by Hofstede de Groot. Apparently Wilhelm von Bode had seen the painting in London at the Duveen brothers and was convinced it was a Rembrandt. After Hofstede de Groot's publication however, the attribution was challenged by John Charles Van Dyke, who felt this was the copy and not the other way around. W.R. Valentiner, who had just published his own article about the newly acquired B. Altman collection (with 20 Rembrandts), at first felt it to be autograph Rembrandt, but gradually came to agree with Van Dyke that it was a copy of the Dresden picture. Though no one had an idea who the painter could have been if not Rembrandt, Van Dyke and Valentiner felt that since the Dresden version was attributed to Bernaert Fabritius, the attribution for this one should be after Bernaert Fabritius. Valentiner had it his way, but not before Hofstede de Groot had died. The attribution was changed in December 1937 to Bernaert Fabritius and stayed that way for over half a century until Walter Liedtke officially changed it to "Copy after Willem Drost" in 1991.

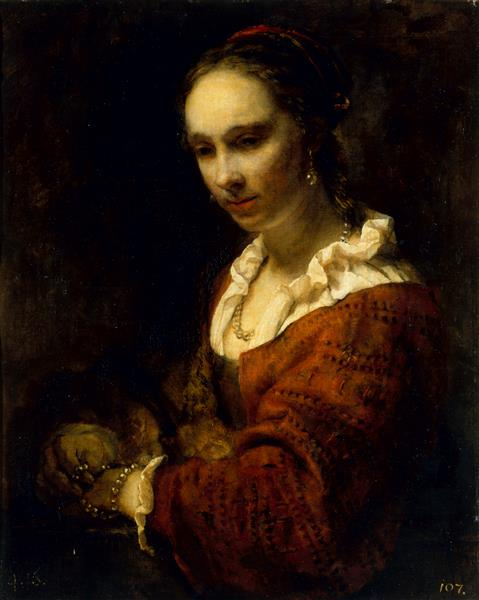
Young Woman in a Pearl Necklace, Dresden original
