= European Society for Catholic Theology =

The European Society of Catholic Theology is an association of European Catholic theologians whose goal is to promote the academic discipline of Catholic theology primarily at the intersection where Church and society meet. Founded in 1989, its members work at theological institutes, universities, academies and seminaries. It publishes a bi-annual journal, the ET-Studies, which explores issues facing contemporary theological debate in Europe.

== ET-Studies ==
The international journal published by the European Society for Catholic Theology develops theological and interdisciplinary perspectives on faith and religion in contemporary Europe. The journal has been published twice a year since 2010 in print and digitally with open access.

=== Orientation ===
ET-Studies brings together voices and positions from all disciplines within theology and religious studies as well as other relevant disciplines at European universities. The promotion of dialogue between Eastern and Western Europe as well as academic exchange with theologians from other Christian churches and other religious and cultural traditions are central concerns of the journal.

Each issue of the journal is dedicated to one main topic. This is taken from the broad spectrum of topics and theories relating to the sources, history, and world views of faith communities in contemporary European culture(s). Central subjects of the discourse are also current findings in the human, social and natural sciences as well as challenges for theology associated with cultural and political developments.

The journal sees itself as closely linked to the Second Vatican Council's pastoral constitution Gaudium et Spes, its definition of the relationship between the Church and the world and its examination of the ‘signs of the times’ in the light of the Gospel.

=== Structure ===
The journal is published by the European Society for Catholic Theology. The journal's editor since 2025 has been Michael Quisinsky, who took over from Gerhard Kruip (2010-2025). The international advisory board consists of fifteen theologians from various European countries.

In addition to articles on the main topic, the individual issues of the journal contain free articles, conference and national reports as well as reviews. Submitted articles are subjected to a double-blind peer review process before publication. The journal's articles are published in one of three languages: English, French or German, and are always preceded by abstracts in the other two languages.

=== Editor ===
Editorial Director

- Michael Quisinsky

Editorial Board

- Johannes Probst
- Odile Flichy
- Geoffrey Turner

International Advisory Board

- Riccardo Battocchio
- Lieven Boeve
- Alexandre Coutinho Lopes de Brito Palma
- Jozef Jančovič
- Peter G. Kirchschläger
- Anne-Marie Korte
- Ottilia Lukács
- Jana Plátová
- Janusz Podzielny
- Fáinche Ryan
- Hans-Joachim Sander
- Janet Soskice
- Christoph Theobald
- Myriam Wijlens
- Mark Joseph Zammit
