= Young Woman in a Pearl Necklace =

Painting by Willem Drost

Young Woman with a Pearl Necklace
- Hendrickje Stoffels
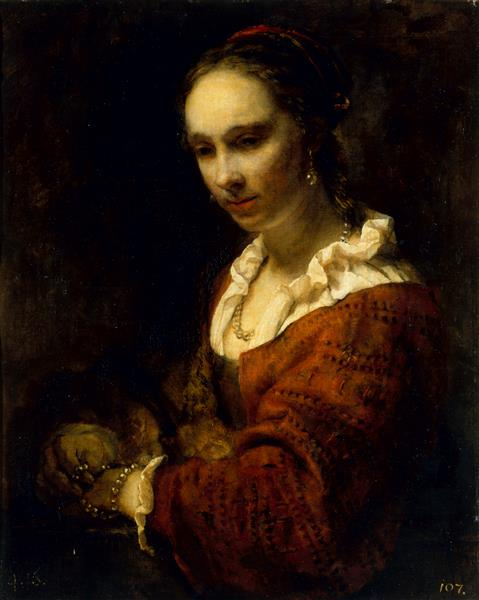
- Year: c. 1654
- Dimensions: 78 cm (31 in) × 62.5 cm (24.6 in)
- Location: Gemäldegalerie Alte Meister
- Accession: Gal.-Nr. 1591

Young Woman in a Pearl Necklace (circa 1654) is an oil on canvas painting by the Dutch painter Willem Drost. It is an example of Dutch Golden Age painting and is part of the collection of Gemäldegalerie Alte Meister.

The woman (the same model as in Drost's Bathsheba with King David's Letter) is looking at the viewer and is wearing a red bodice that is slightly open to reveal a pearl necklace.

This painting was documented in 1914 by Hofstede de Groot as a copy of a Rembrandt in the collection of the Metropolitan Museum of Art. That painting had just been acquired the year before through the Benjamin Altman bequest and was considered one of the gems of the collection. Hofstede de Groot thought he saw a portrait of Rembrandt's wife Hendrickje Stoffels and wrote; "719. HENDRICKJE STOFFELS. Half-length. She sits, inclined to the right, bending her head and looking at the spectator. With the right hand she puts a string of pearls on her left wrist. Her red gown is cut out at the bosom, and the pleated chemisette is open; on her bare breast lies a pearl necklace. In the left ear, which is alone visible, is a pendant with a pearl. On her hair is a cap. Painted about 1658. A copy is in the Dresden Gallery, 1908 catalogue, No. 1591, as the work of Bernaert Fabritius. Mentioned by Hofstede de Groot, Onze Kunst, 1999, p. 181. In the possession of L. Lesser, London. In the possession of Duveen Brothers, London. In the collection of B. Altman, New York; bequeathed in 1913 to the Metropolitan Museum. In the Metropolitan Museum, New York. "

Today, the attribution to Fabritius has been dropped and this painting is considered an authentic painting by Drost, while the MET's painting is now considered a period copy of this painting:

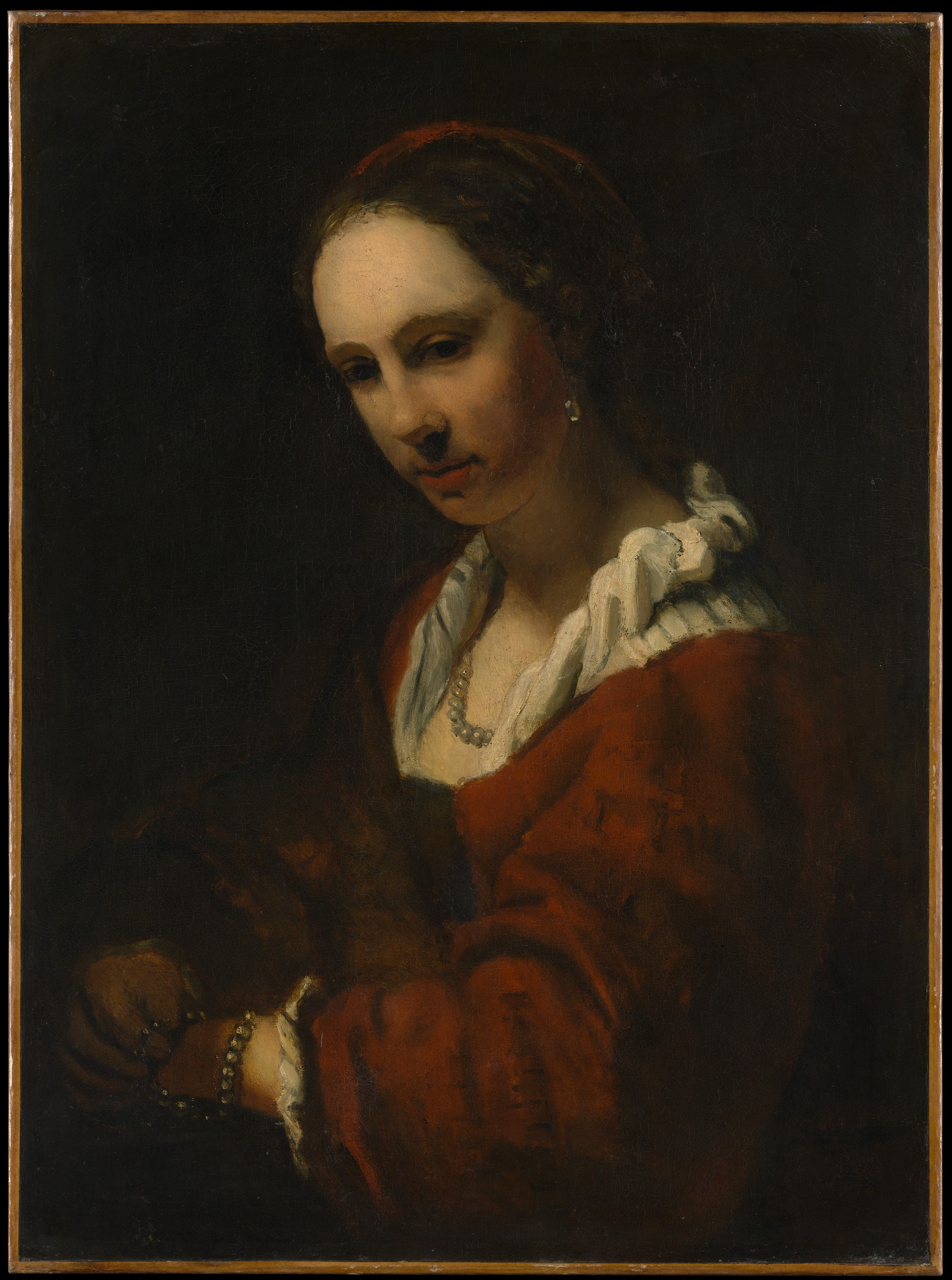
Young Woman in a Pearl Necklace (New York)

The model appears to be the same woman as in other Drost paintings:

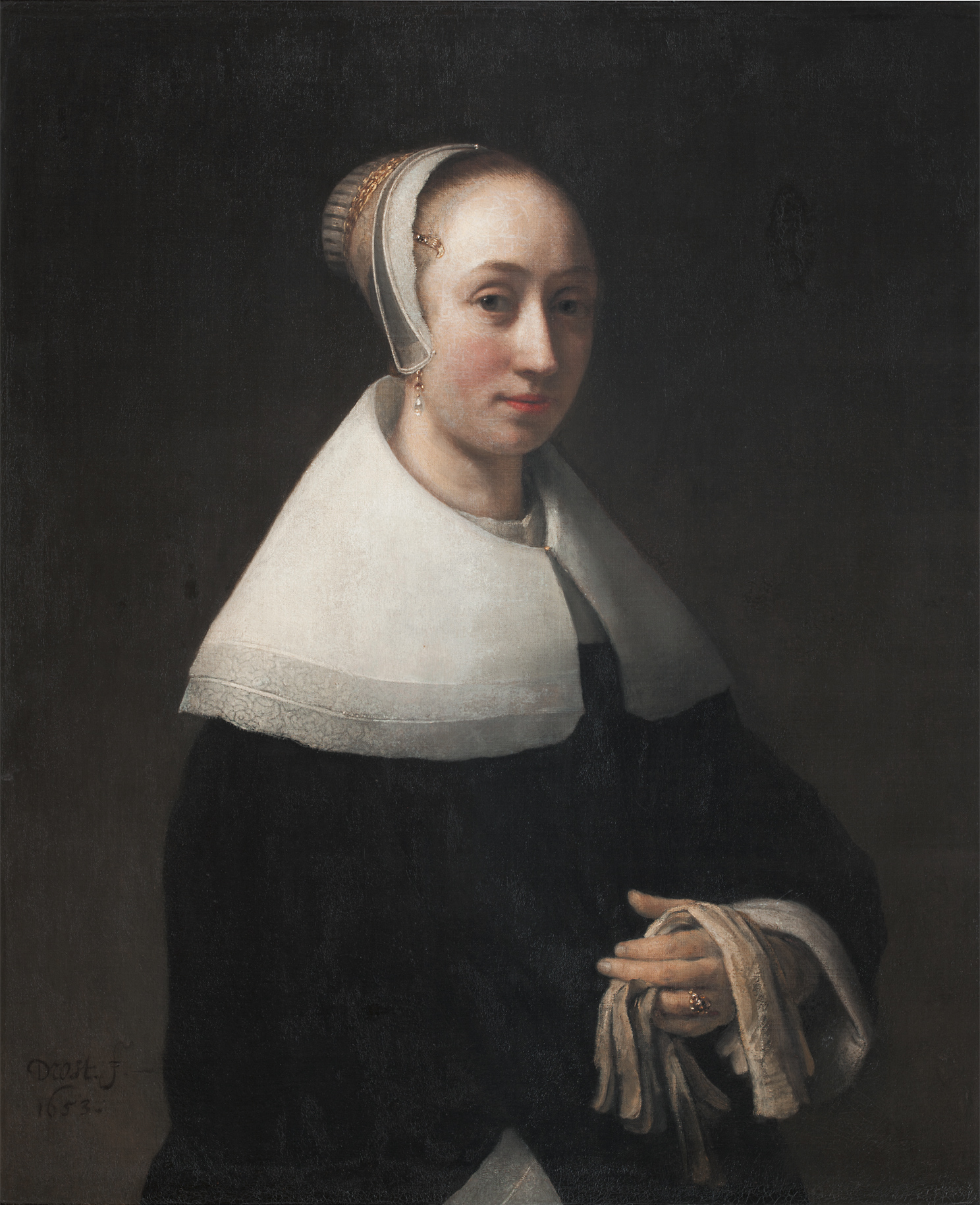
Portrait of a Woman

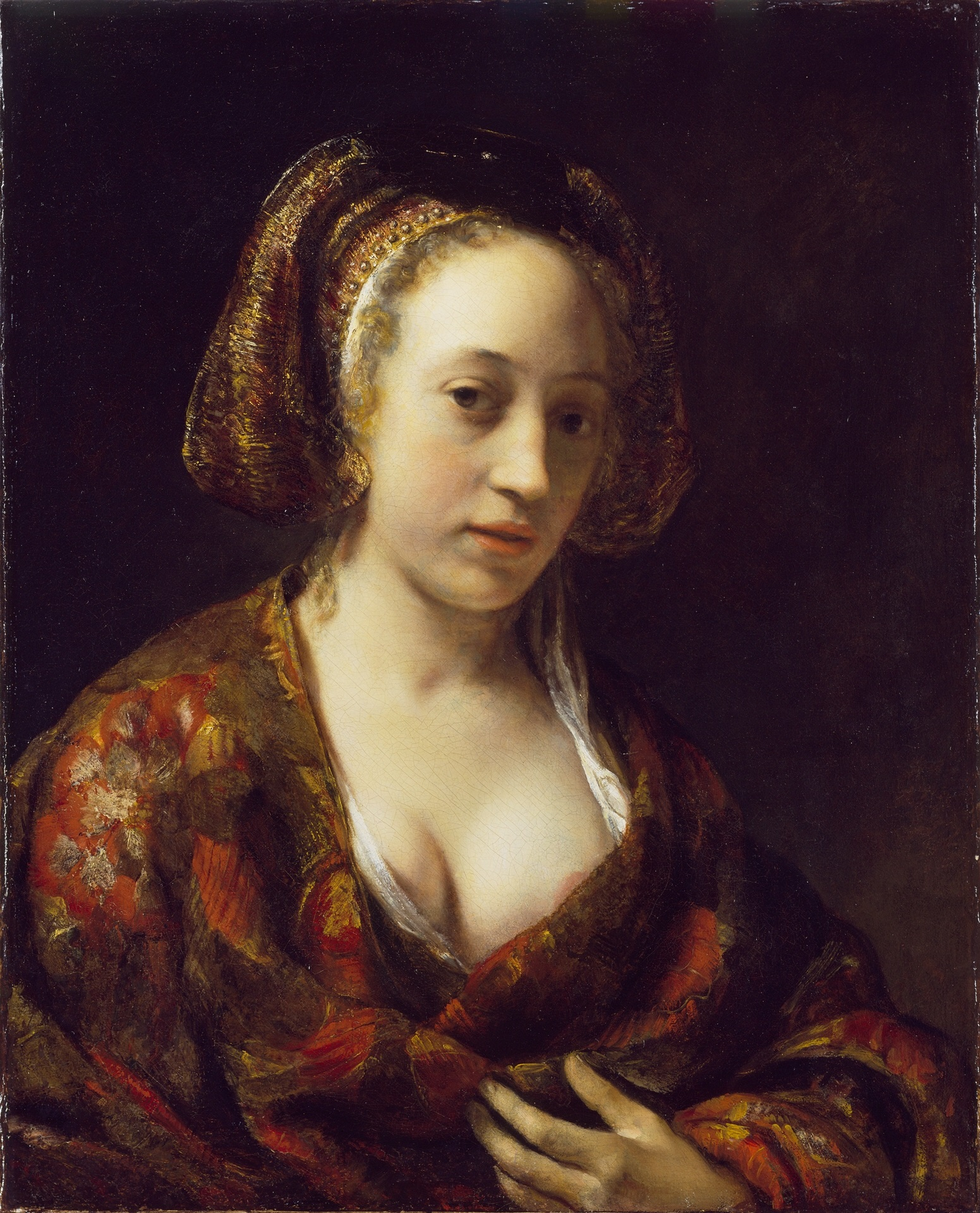
Young Woman in a Brocade Gown

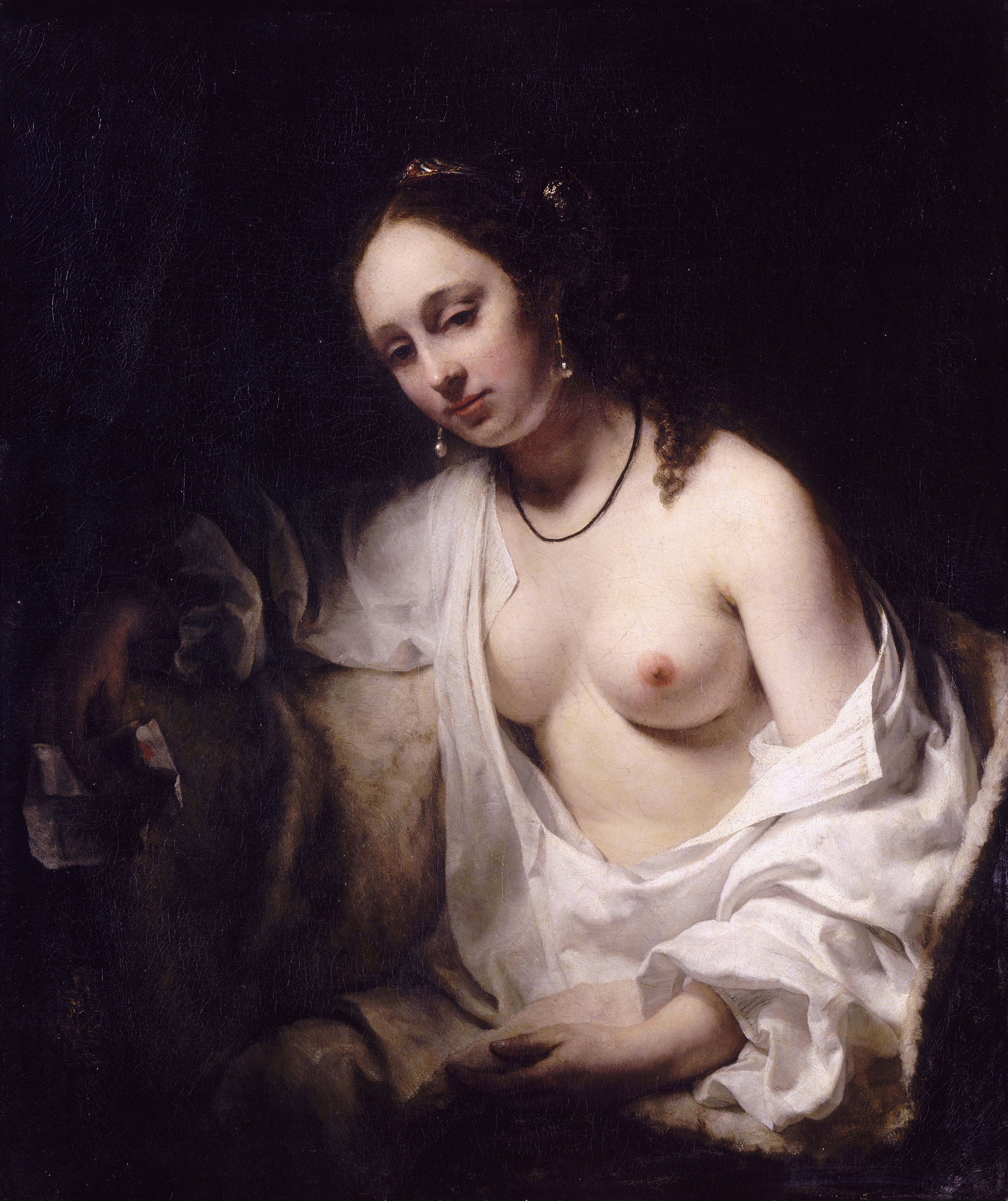
Bathsheba with David's Letter
