= Jan Vermeer van Utrecht =

Dutch painter

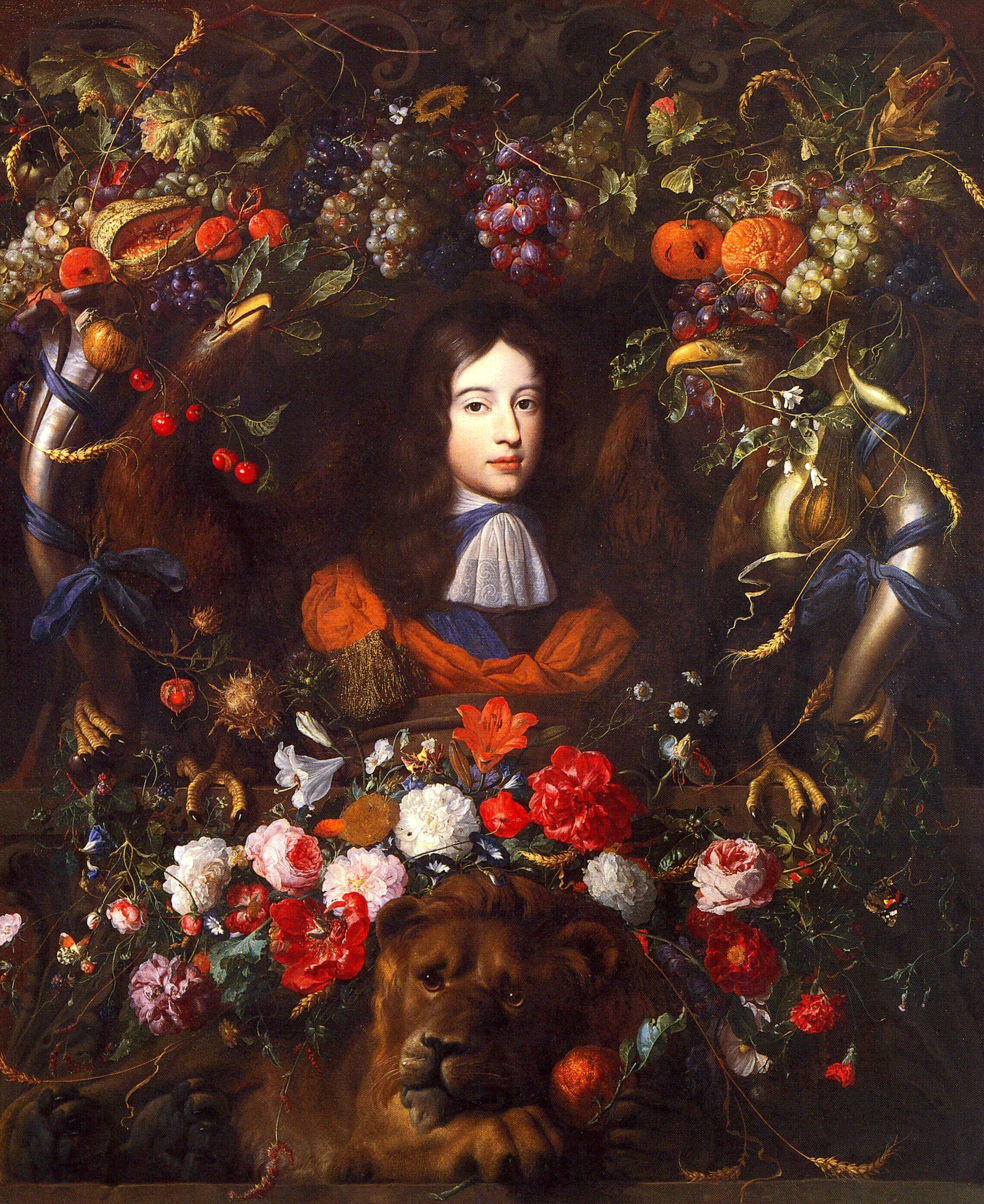
- Portrait of the Prince William III in a garland of flowers by Jan Davidsz de Heem, with a portrait by Vermeer van Utrecht
- Born: Johan van der Meer; 1630; Schipluiden
- Died: 1696 (aged 65–66); Vreeswijk
- Known for: Painting
- Movement: Baroque

Jan Vermeer van Utrecht (16 February 1630 (bapt.) – c. 1696) was a Dutch Golden Age painter. Though he was born near Delft, there is no known relation between this painter and Johannes Vermeer.

== Biography ==
Vermeer was born in Schipluiden. His father died when he was 10 and he was raised by his step-grandfather in Rotterdam. According to Houbraken he travelled to Italy with Lieve Verschuier and became friends with Willem Drost and Johann Carl Loth.

He returned north in 1662, where he became a member of the Utrecht Guild of St. Luke in 1663 and became deacon of the guild 1664–1666. Houbraken tells a curious story about Vermeer van Utrecht in his biography of Jan Davidsz de Heem. In this story, on his return from Italy, Vermeer marries a widow who owns a white lead factory. He is wealthy and has a carefree life until his wife dies and then his factory is burned by French soldiers. He manages to save a garland painting by De Heem that he once paid 2000 guilders for. This was an enormous sum of money, but Houbraken mentions that his grandfather had been a wealthy man, and until his factory was destroyed, Vermeer van Utrecht had been painting for pleasure, rather than professionally. The amount is meant as an indication of the fame and esteem of De Heem, rather than the wealth of Vermeer van Utrecht. Vermeer van Utrecht then applies to his benefactor, Frederick Nassau de Zuylestein, to give him a government post in return for this painting, which he offers to paint with the likeness of the young prince Willem III in the middle of the garland. The lord of Zuylestein was the governor of the young prince from 1659 to 1666, so this deal must have been done sometime between 1662 (Vermeer van Utrecht's return from Italy), and 1672 (the death of the lord of Zuylestein). Apparently, the deal is done, and several years pass, in which Vermeer van Utrecht did become an appointed member of the Utrecht regency (Vroedschap), but where he felt like a fifth wheel. In 1672 the Utrecht council takes pity on him, and gave him the post of Toll-collector and controller of the river lock at Vreeswijk, where he later remarried.

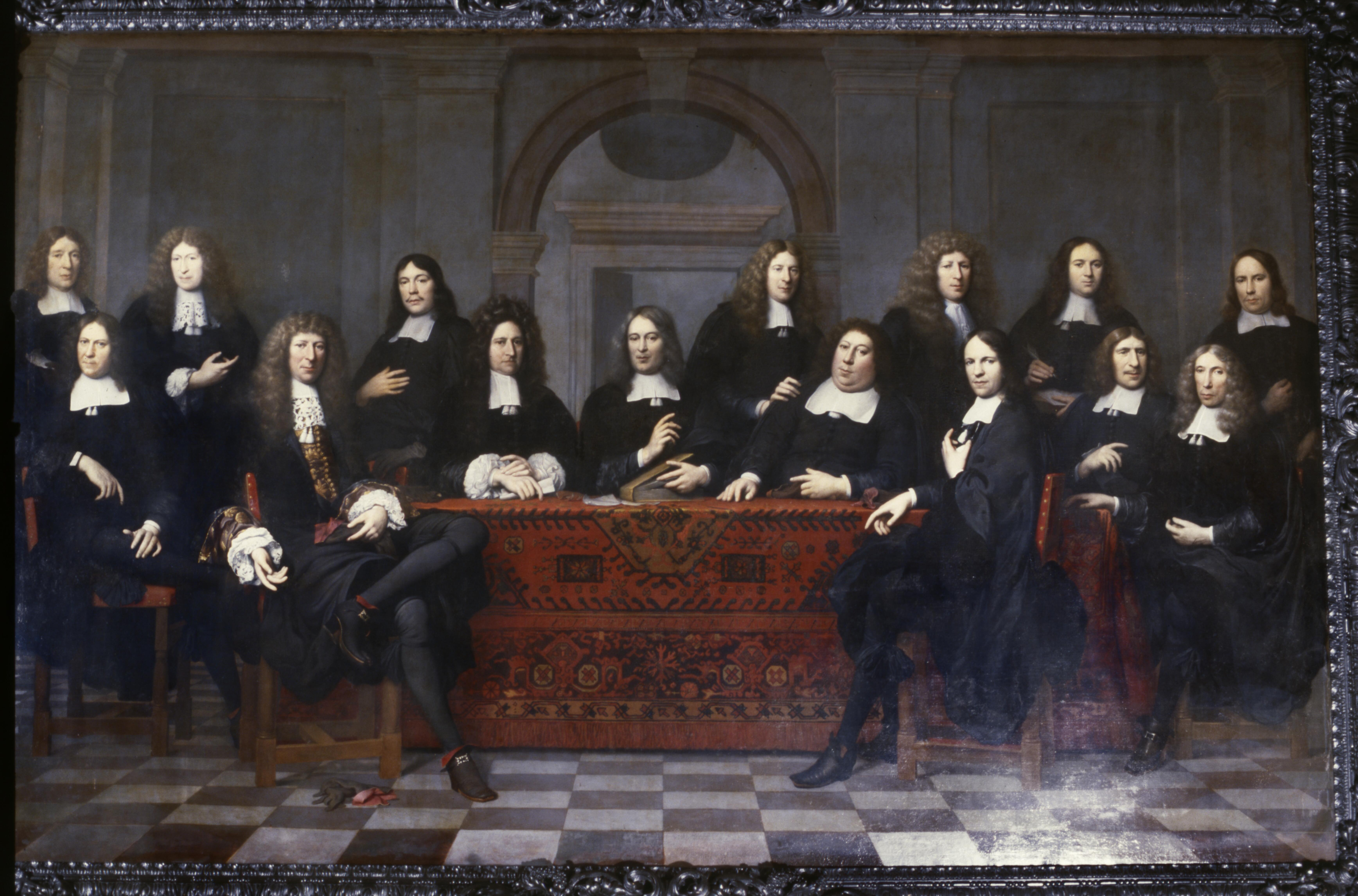
Regents of the Orphanage in Utrecht, 1680

Houbraken never saw the painting that he wrote about, but this must be the painting now hanging in the Musée des Beaux-Arts de Lyon, that was taken with the rest of the Royal painting collection as war booty to France a century later in 1795.

Perhaps because of this story, Vermeer van Utrecht became known as a portraitist, and painted a portrait of the regents of various Utrecht institutions, among them the orphanage in 1680. He married Hendrina Hounietop in 1683 in Vreeswijk, which is where he died between May 1695 and September 1697 in Vreeswijk.
