= Lievens (surname) =

Lievens is a Dutch patronymic surname ("Lieven's") most common in Belgium. People with this surname or patronym include:

- Constant Lievens (1856–1893), Flemish Jesuit missionary in India
- Dirk Lievens (1612–aft.1650), Dutch painter, brother of Jan
- Jan Lievens (1607–1674), Dutch painter
- Marc Lievens (born 1948), Belgian racing cyclist
- Roeland Lievens (born 1983), Dutch rower

== See also ==
- Lieven, Baltic German noble family
- Lieven (given name), Dutch masculine given name
- Sint-Lievens-Houtem and Sint-Lievens-Esse, neighboring towns in East Flanders
- Sint-Lievens-Merk, town in French Flanders
