= Timothy with his Grandmother Lois =

Painting by Willem Drost

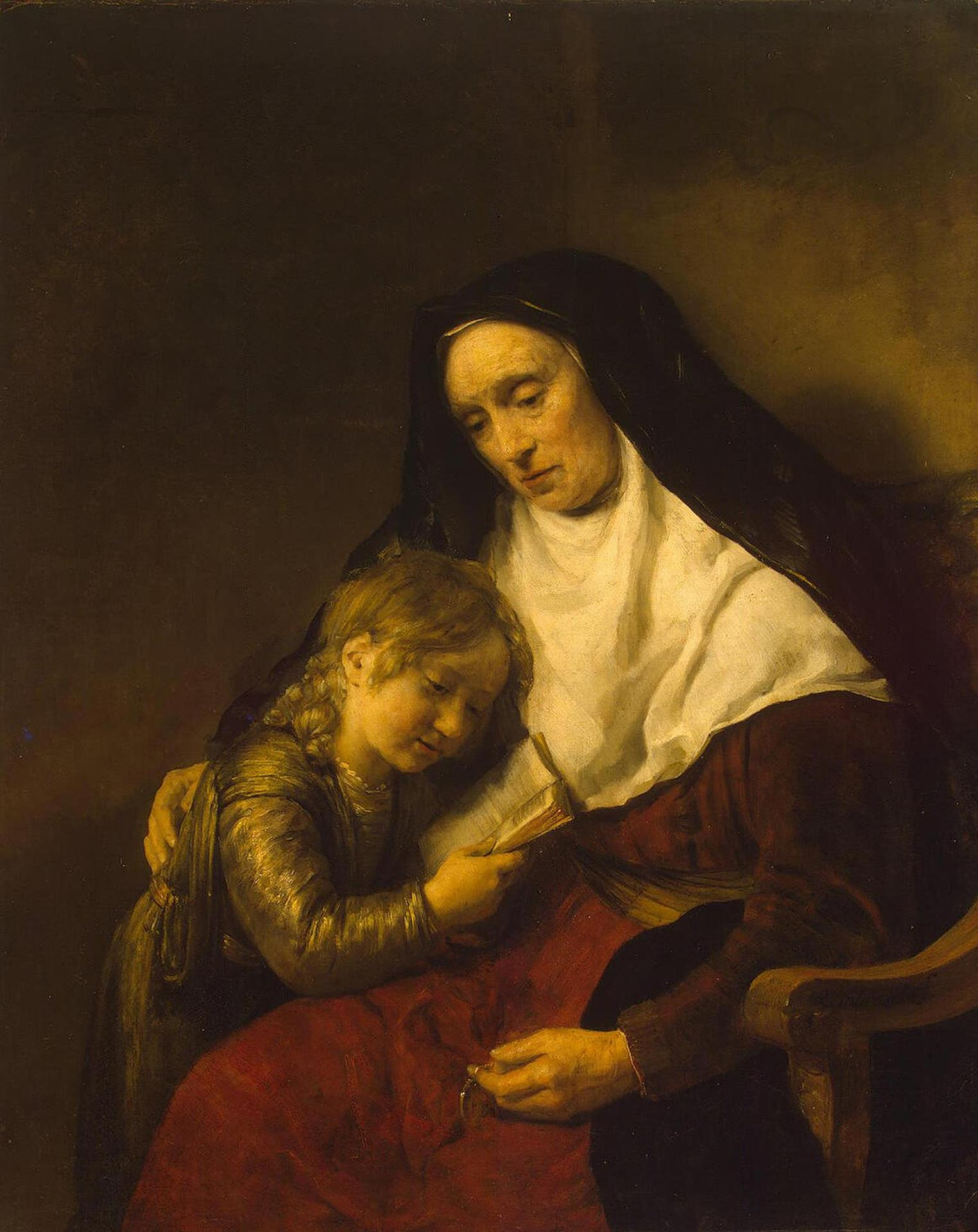
Timothy with his Grandmother Lois by Willem Drost

Timothy with his Grandmother Lois or The Prophetess Anna Teaching a Child is a 1650 or c. 1654 oil on canvas painting, attributed to Rembrandt until 1910 but since 1924 thought to be by Willem Drost. Its two titles refer to Timothy, Lois and Anna. It is now in the Hermitage Museum, in Saint Petersburg.

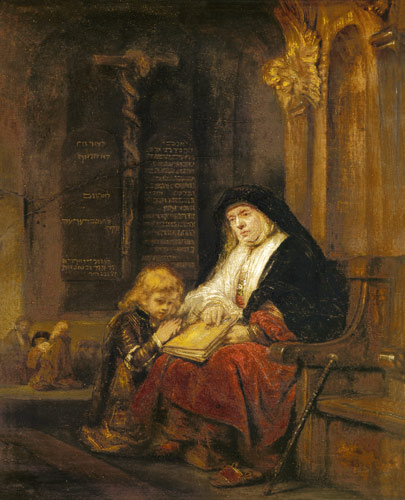
Rembrandt's Hannah and Samuel, c.1648-1650, National Gallery of Scotland, influenced by Drost's work

The work bears a signature by Rembrandt, but this was contested in 1910 by Abraham Bredius, who reassigned it Lambert Doomer. G. Falck first mooted Drost's authorship in 1924, which was affirmed by Wilhelm Reinhold Valentiner in 1939 and Jonathan Bikker in 2001.

== Copy ==
A copy by an unknown artist is now in the National Museum in Wrocław. It was bought by a Berlin museum in 1837 and transferred to the Schlesisches Museum der bildenden Künste in 1884. It was then placed in the stores of the Department of Museums and Monument Protection in Wrocław in 1945-1946 before being moved to its present home in 1947.
