= Collège des Bernardins =

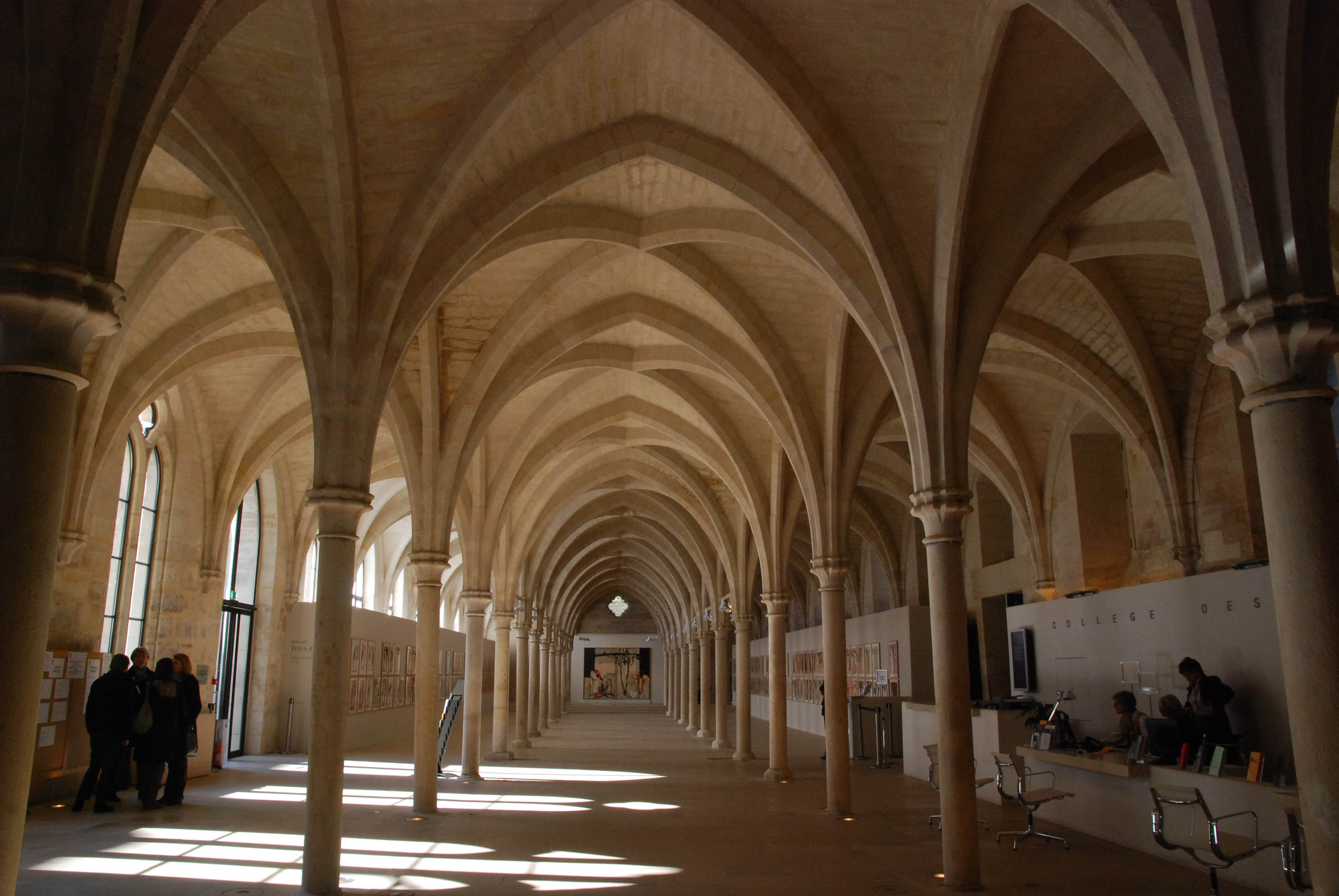
- The refectory of the College des Bernardins in Paris
- Interactive map of the Collège des Bernardins area

General information
- Type: College
- Architectural style: Gothic style
- Location: 20, rue de Poissy in the 5th arrondissement of Paris
- Coordinates: 48.8488°N 2.3520°E
- Construction started: 13th century

References
- http://www.collegedesbernardins.fr/en

The Collège of Bernardins, or Collège Saint-Bernard, located no 20, rue de Poissy in the 5th arrondissement of Paris, is a former Cistercian college of the University of Paris. Founded by Stephen of Lexington, abbot of Clairvaux, and built from 1248 with the encouragement of Pope Innocent IV, it served until the French Revolution as the residence for the Cistercian monks who were studying at the University of Paris.

After an overall renovation completed in September 2008, it is now a place for meetings, dialogues, training and culture. It offers a program of public conferences and symposia, exhibitions, concerts, activities for young people and a theological and biblical studies center. The Ecole Cathédrale offers coursework on Christian thought and every year enrolls over 3,000 students in its courses. Since 2009, it has housed the Académie catholique de France.

The college was listed as a French historical monument on 10 February 1871. The Foundation des Bernardins, which operates the college, is placed under the control of the Notre-Dame cathedral foundation, both of which are supervised by the government of France. In 2023, 28.8% of the college's budget was paid by the catholic Diocese of Paris.

== References, notes and bibliography ==
=== Bibliography ===
==== Collège des Bernardins ====
- Directed by Vincent Aucante, Le Collège des Bernardins, Association du 18-24 Poissy, Paris, 2008 ISBN 978-2-917784-00-6 ; p. 256
- Pierre Engel, La résurrection du Collège des Bernardins, p. 198-209, dans le Bulletin Ouvrages métalliques, No. 6, 2010 ISBN 978-2-7258-0018-9 ; p. 256

==== Medieval Monastic Orders ====
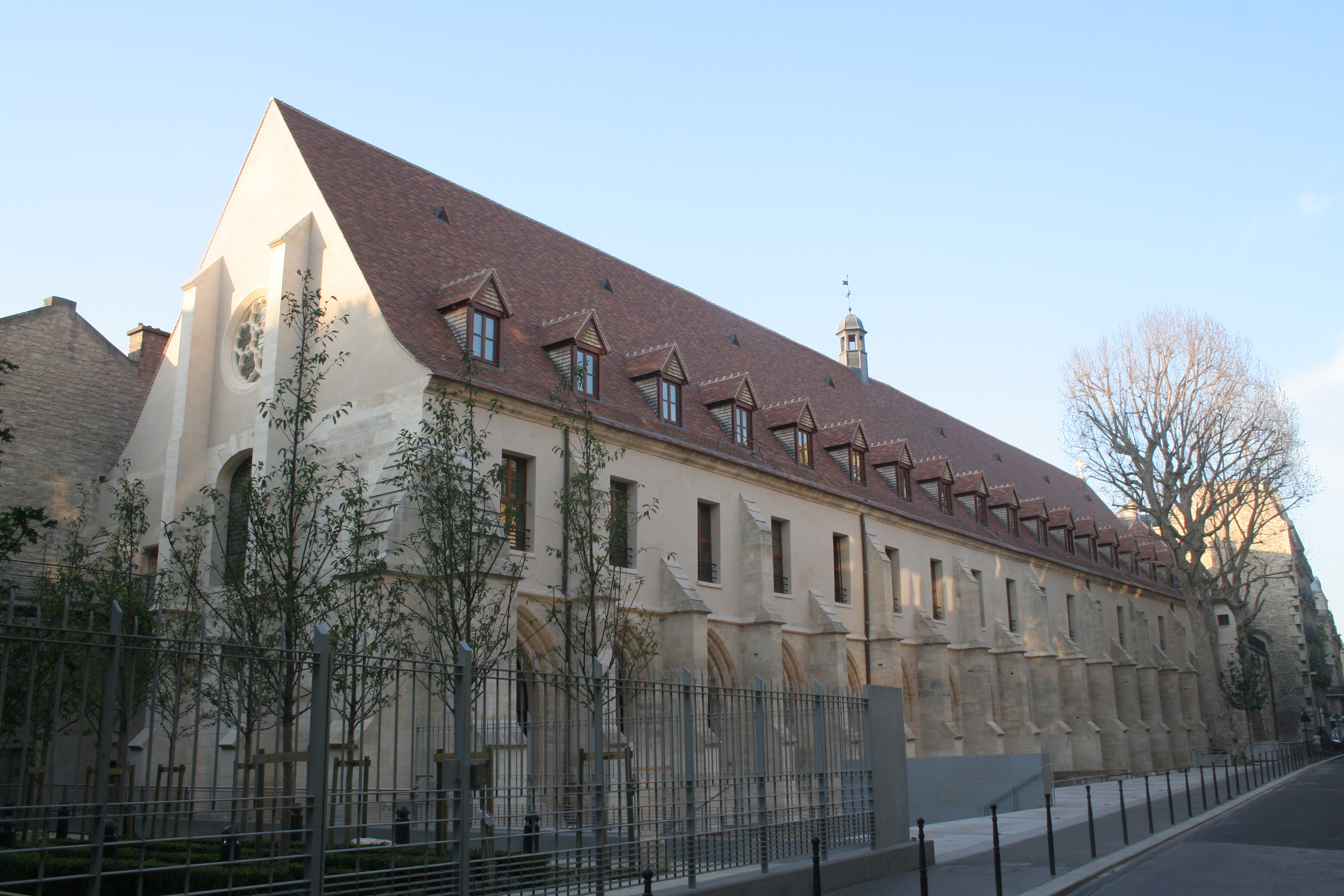
Bernardins college's facade.

- Henri-Irénée Marrou, L'église de l'Antiquité tardive (303-604), Éditions du Seuil (collection Points Histoires H81), Paris, 1985 ISBN 2-02-008747-2 ; p. 321
- Jean Chélini, Histoire religieuse de l'Occident médiéval, Hachette - Pluriel, Paris, 1991 ISBN 2-01-27907-47 ; p. 661
- Marcel Pacaut, Les ordres monastiques et religieux au Moyen Âge, Nathan, Paris, 1993 ISBN 2-09-191356-1 ; p. 256
- Directed by Jacques Berlioz, Moines et religieux au Moyen Âge, Éditions du Seuil (collection Points Histoire H185), Paris, 1994 ISBN 2-02-022685-5 ; p. 346
- Jacques Paul, Le christianisme occidental au Moyen Âge. (IVth to XVth century), Armand Colin, Paris, 2004 ISBN 2-200-25187-4 ; p. 396
- Geneviève Bührer-Thierry, Charles Mériaux, Histoire de France. La France avant la France (481-888), Éditions Belin, Paris, 2010 ISBN 978-2-7011-3358-4 ; p. 688

==== Parisian Colleges & Universities ====
- Jacques Verger, Les universités au Moyen Âge, puf (collection Quadrige, Paris, 2007 ISBN 978-2-13-056091-3 ; p. 226
- Aurélie Perraut, L'architecture des collèges parisiens au Moyen Âge, Presses universitaires Paris Sorbonne (collection cultures et civilisations médiévales No. 46), Paris, 2009 ISBN 978-2-84050-638-6 ; p. 467
- Michel Sot, Jean-Patrice Boudet, Anita Guerreau-Jalabert, Histoire culturelle de la France. Tome 1. Le Moyen Âge, Éditions du Seuil (collection Points Histoire H348), Paris, 2005 ISBN 978-2-02-082675-4 ; p. 472
- Jacques Le Goff, Les intellectuels au Moyen Âge, Éditions du Seuil (collection Points Histoire H78), Paris, 2000 ISBN 978-2-02-008691-2 ; p. 233

==== Cistercian culture ====
- Directed by Julie Roux, Les cisterciens, MSM, Vic-en-Bigorre, 2003 ISBN 2-911515-69-2 BnF 39026428z ; p. 320
- Georges Duby, Saint Bernard. L'art cistercien, Arts et Métiers Graphiques, Paris, 1976 ISBN 2-7004-0020-8 ; p. 222

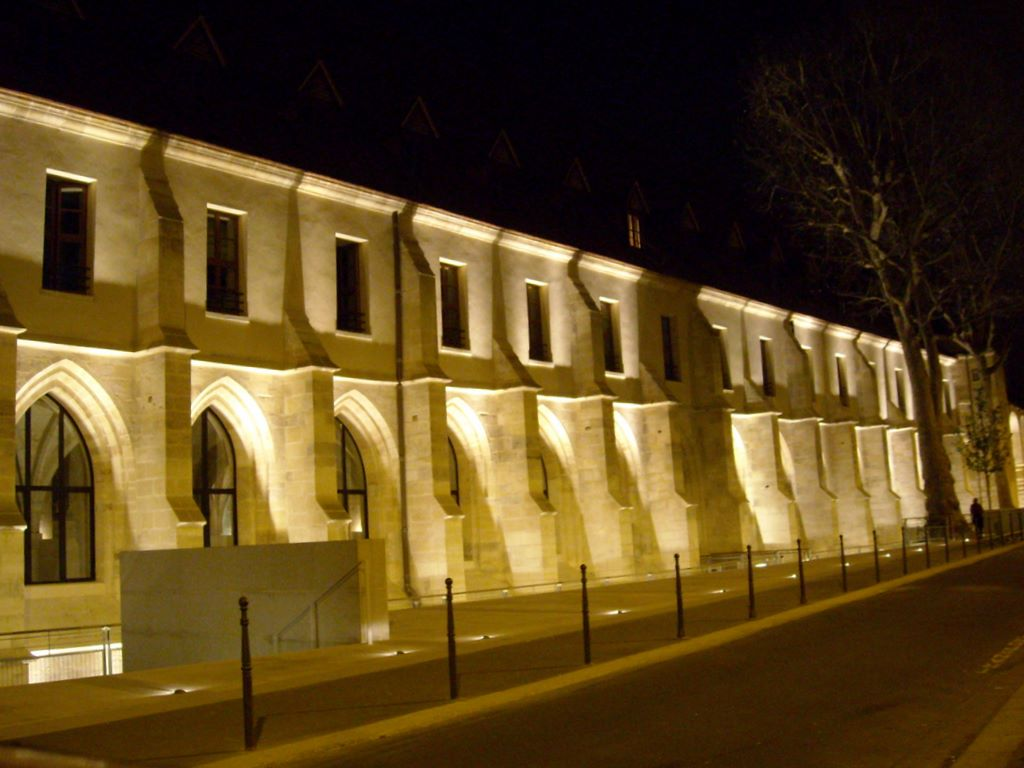
Collège des Bernardins after renovation - night shot
