= Lieven De Cauter =

Lieven De Cauter (born 1959 in Koolskamp) is a Belgian philosopher, art historian, writer, and activist based in Brussels. He has written and edited numerous books focusing on contemporary art, architecture, politics, and the city, including: The Capsular Civilization: On the City in the Age of Fear; Heterotopia and the City: Public space in a Postcivil society, co-edited with Michiel Dehaene; and Art and Activism in the Age of Gloablization, co-edited with Karel van Haesebrouck and Ruben De Roo. As an activist, he initiated the BRussels Tribunal on the war in Iraq and is a co-founder of Platform for Liberty of Expression.

== Selected publications ==
- De Cauter, Lieven (2004). The Capsular Civilization: On the City in the Age of Fear. Brussels: NAi Publishers. ISBN 90-5662-407-5.
- Dehaene, Michiel; De Cauter, Lieven, eds. (2008). Heterotopia and the City: Public Space in a Postcivil Society. New York: Routledge. ISBN 978-0-415-42288-8.
- Dehaene, Michiel; De Cauter, Lieven, eds. (2010). Power: Producing the Contemporary City. Brussels: NAi Publishers. ISBN 90-5662-579-9.
- De Cauter, Lieven (2011). De Roo, Ruben; Vanhaesebrouck, Karel (eds.). Art & Activism in the Age of Globalization. Brussels: NAi Publishers. ISBN 90-5662-779-1.
- De Cauter, Lieven (2013). Entropic Empire: On the City of Man in The Age of Disaster. Brussels: NAi Publishers. ISBN 94-6208-028-3.
