= Willem Drost =

Dutch painter

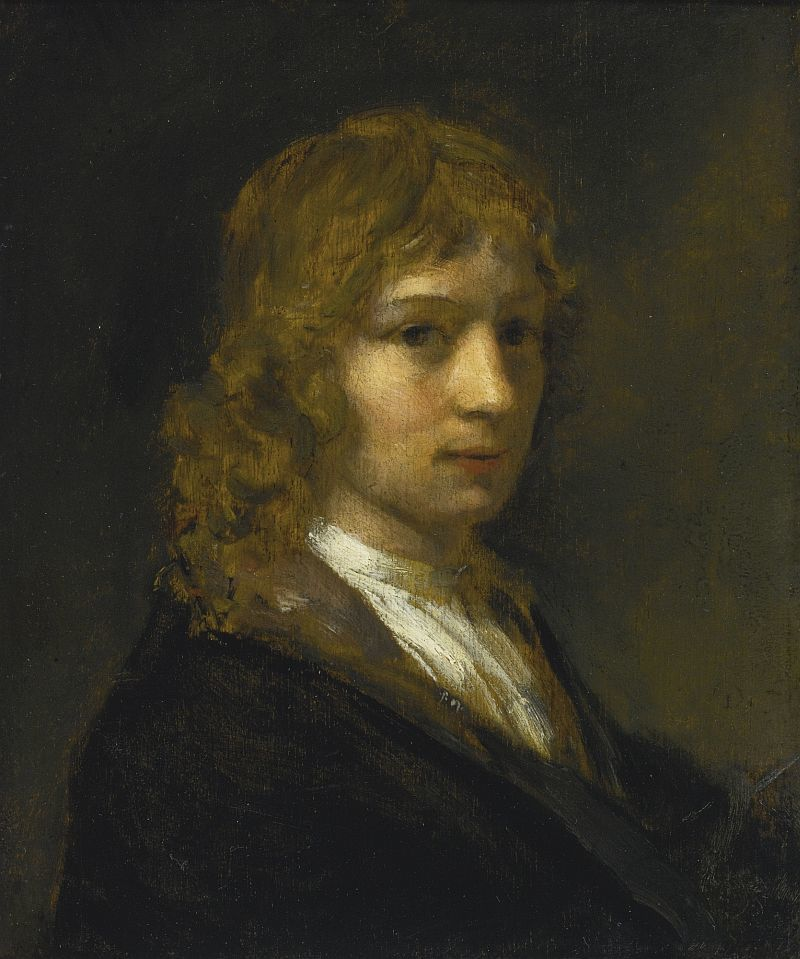
- Willem Drost self-portrait (c. 1652–1654)
- Born: Willem Drost baptized 19 April 1633; Amsterdam
- Died: buried 25 February 1659 (aged 25); Venice
- Known for: Painting
- Movement: Baroque

Willem Drost (baptized 19 April 1633 – buried 25 February 1659) was a Dutch Golden Age painter and printmaker of history paintings and portraits.

== Biography ==
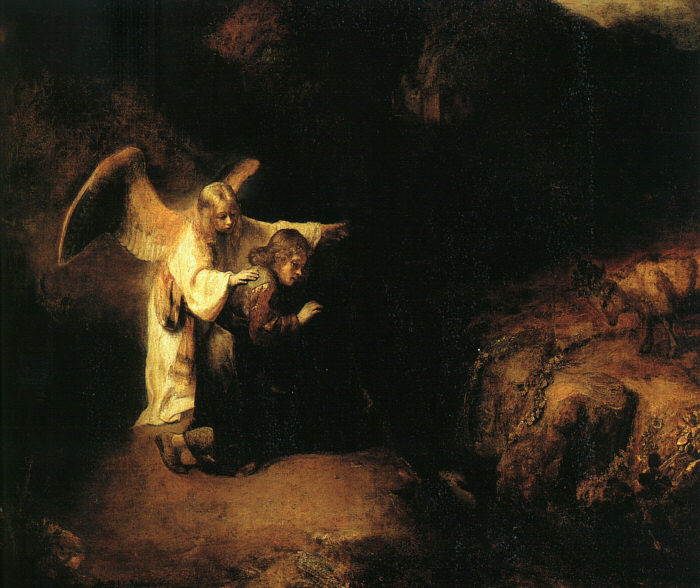
The Vision of Daniel, 1650, Gemäldegalerie, Berlin

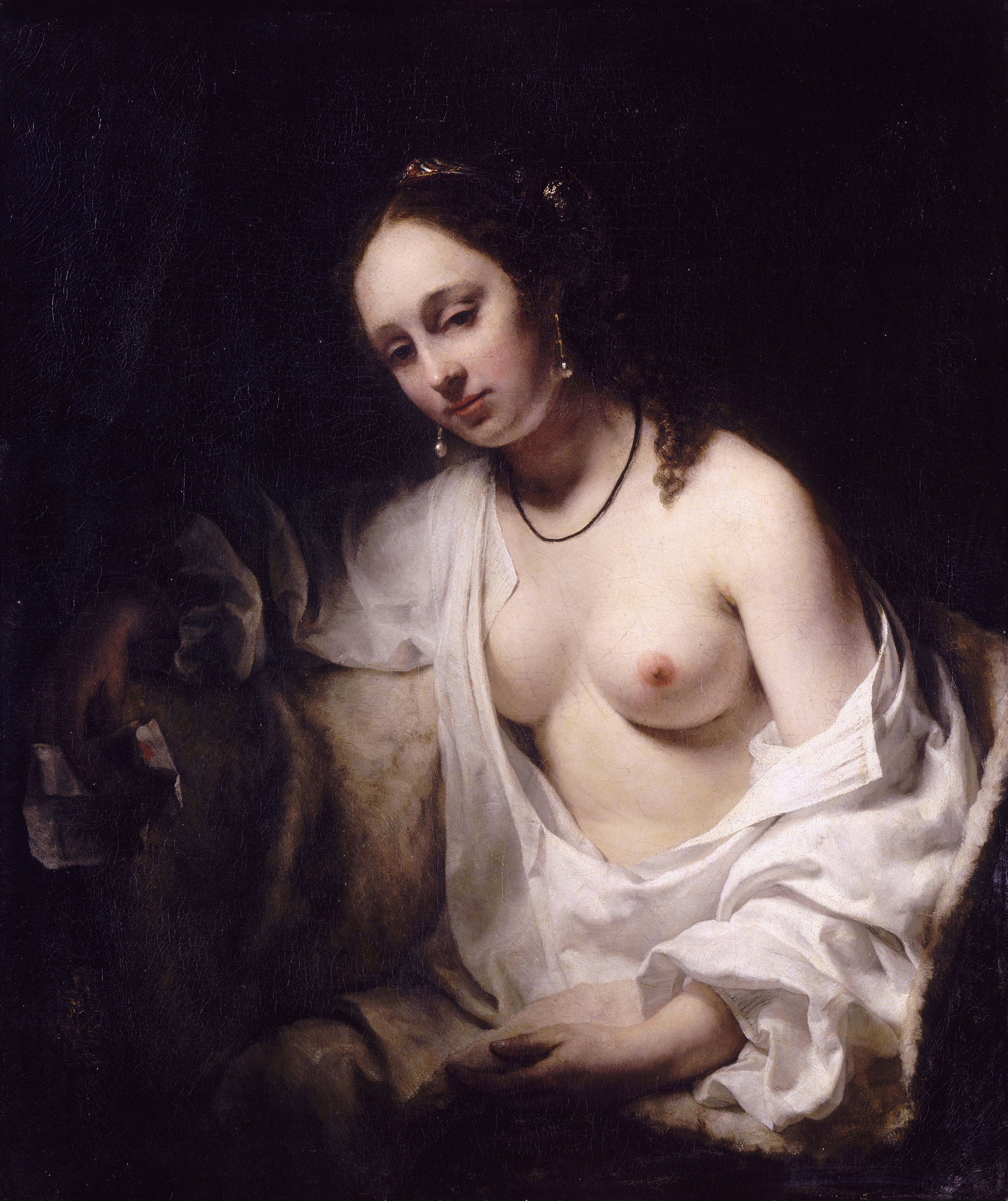
Bathsheba with King David's Letter, 1654, oil on canvas, Louvre

He is a mysterious figure, closely associated with Rembrandt, with very few paintings clearly attributable to him.

He was presumably born in Amsterdam, in what was then known as the United Provinces of the Netherlands, but when and where is unknown. According to the early art historian Arnold Houbraken, he became a student of Rembrandt, possibly in the late 1640s or early 1650s eventually developing a close working relationship, painting history scenes, biblical compositions, symbolic studies of a solitary figure, as well as portraits. As a student, his 1654 painting titled Bathsheba was inspired by Rembrandt's painting done in the same year on the same subject and given the same title, though their treatments are rather different; both Drost's and Rembrandt's paintings are in the Louvre in Paris.

Houbraken described him as a painter of historical allegories and a pupil of Rembrandt. Houbraken saw a Johannes Predicatie (Sermon of John) by him that was well composed and painted. He spent a long period in Rome where he became friends with Karel Lot and the well-to-do Utrecht painter Joan vander Meer, who had travelled to Italy in the company of the marine painter Lieve Verschuier in 1653 and became friends with him there.

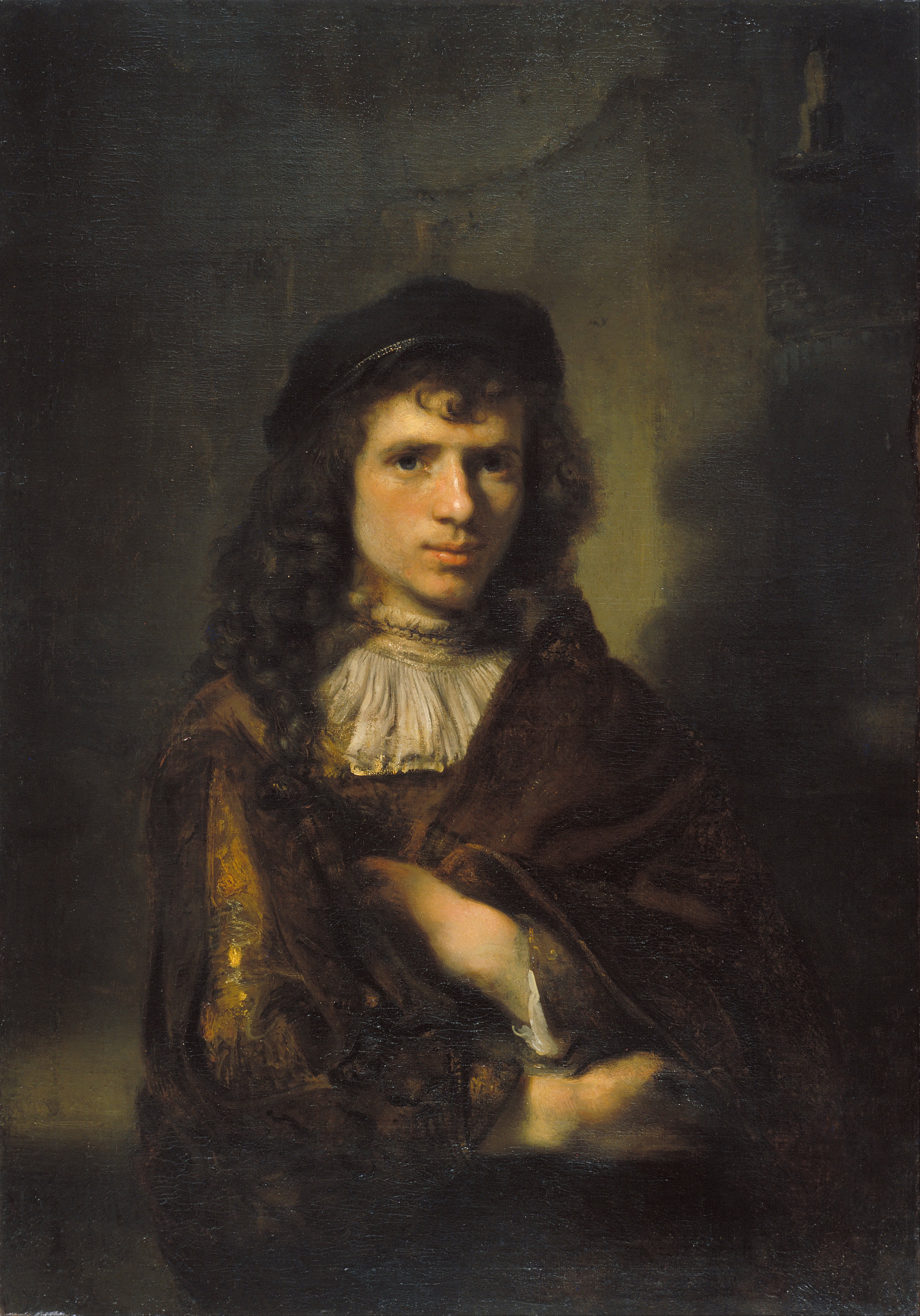
Portrait of a Young Man (c. 1654)

He was in Amsterdam until 1655 and then travelled to Italy. He influenced the painter Adolf Boy. Sometime in the mid-1650s, the young artist went to Rome, where, again according to Houbraken, he collaborated with the German artist Johann Carl Loth on a lost series of the Four Evangelists in Venice. He died in the latter city in 1659.

Willem Drost's recognized lifetime output of artwork is very small, while Rembrandt is credited with more than 2,000 paintings and etchings, the majority of which are not signed. In recent years, some paintings attributed to Rembrandt have had their authenticity come under question. The importance of these Rembrandt works is such that the Foundation Rembrandt Research Project was established in Amsterdam to review the attribution of all of his works. Scholars have now reattributed a number of Rembrandt's paintings to his pupils and associates.

== Legacy ==
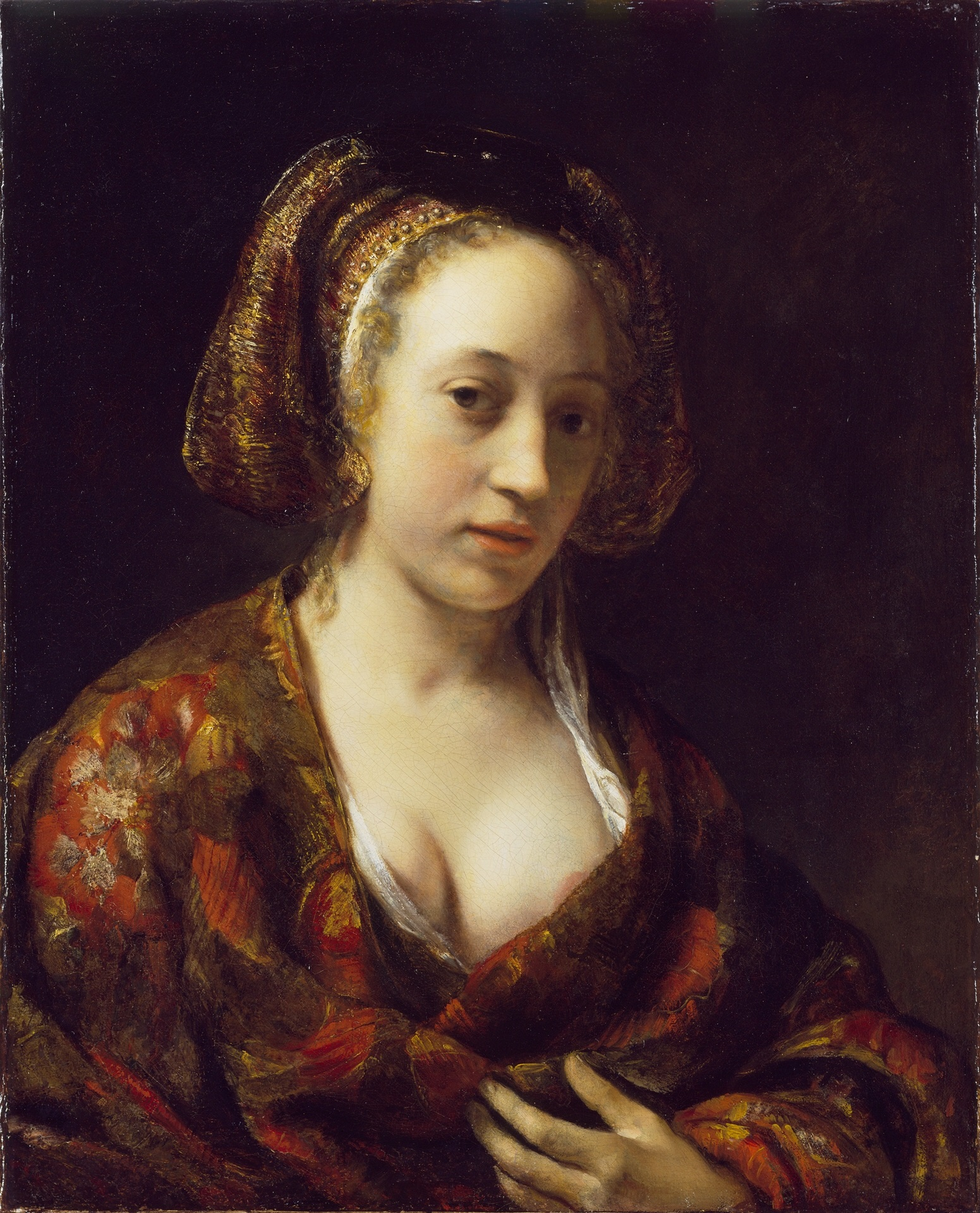
Young Woman in a Brocade Gown (c. 1654), Wallace Collection

Drost was one of Rembrandt's most talented disciples, so much so that his 1654 painting titled: Portrait of a Young Woman with her Hands Folded on a Book was one of the ones attributed to Rembrandt for more than 300 years. As well, when the portrait of a young man on horseback titled The Polish Rider was discovered in 1897, it too was attributed to Rembrandt. Acquired by New York City's Frick Collection, The Polish Rider is one of the Frick Museum's most valued treasures. For years, the painting's subject matter and purpose was questioned by many scholars, led by the renowned expert Julius S. Held in 1944. Starting in 1984, in a movement led by Dr. Josua Bruyn of the Foundation Rembrandt Research Project, some began to believe this great painting may also be that of Willem Drost as may be several others. The Frick Collection has not changed the attribution, and today it is generally believed that Rembrandt initiated the painting but had others help him finish it. These attributions remain controversial, but a reattribution of a group of "Rembrandt" drawings to Drost is more widely accepted.

== Selected works ==
- 1651: Ruth and Naomi on the road to Bethlehem – Ashmolean Museum, Oxford, England
- 1652: Self Portrait of the Artist
- 1653: Portrait of a Man – (Metropolitan Museum of Art, New York City);

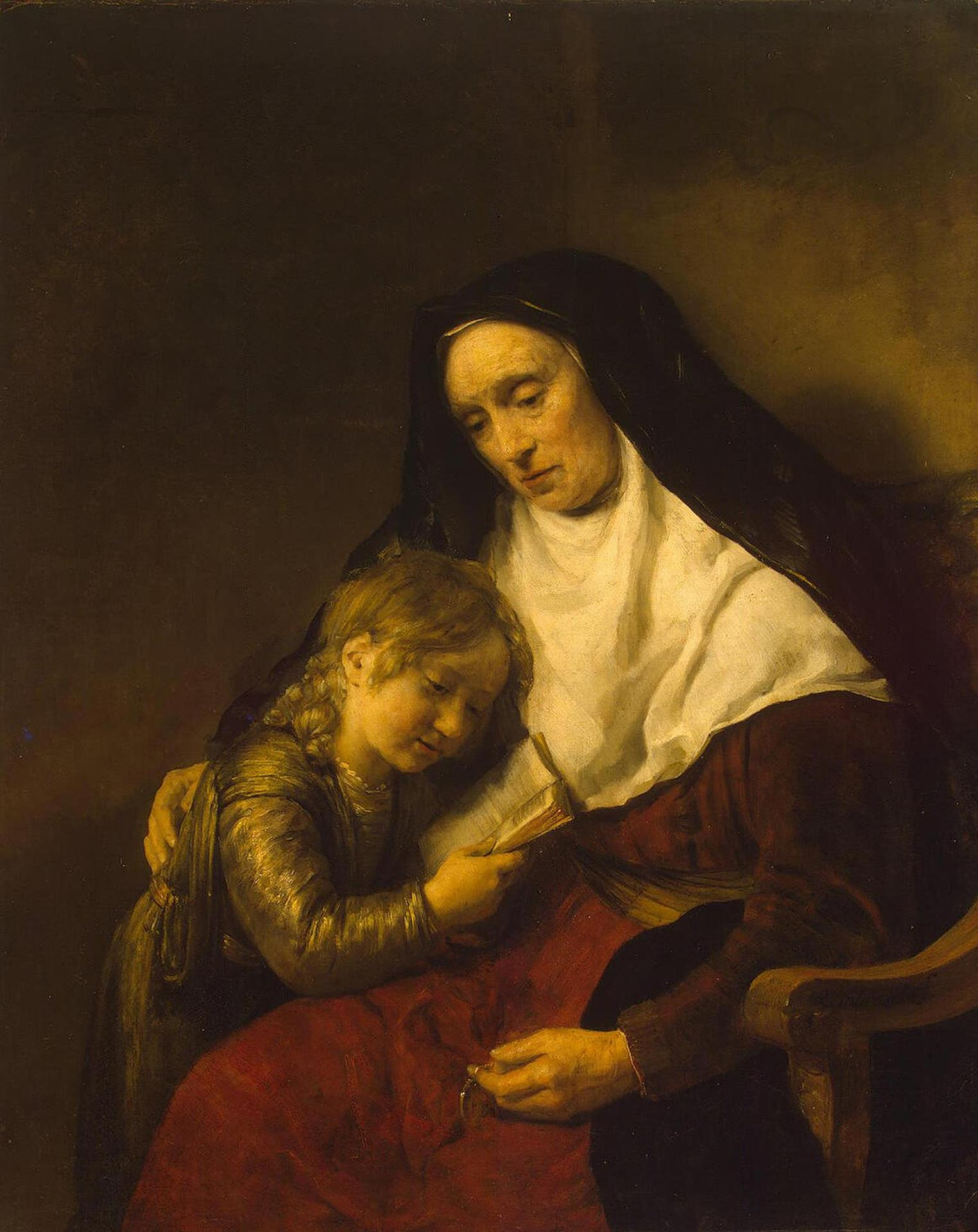
Timothy and Lois, 1650s, Hermitage Museum

- 1653: Portrait of a Woman – Museum Bredius, The Hague;
- 1653:The Philosopher – National Gallery of Art, Washington, DC;
- c.1654: Young Woman in a Brocade Gown – The Wallace Collection, London;
- c.1654 Young Woman in a Pearl Necklace - Gemäldegalerie Alte Meister, Dresden, Germany;
- 1654: Portrait of a Young Woman with her Hands Folded on a Book – National Gallery, London, England;
- 1654: Portrait of an Officer in a Red Beret – David Findlay Galleries, New York City
- 1654: Bathsheba with King David's Letter – Louvre, Paris;
- c. 1655: Self Portrait as Saint John the Evangelist – Agnes Etherington Art Centre, Kingston, Ontario, Canada
- c.1655: Portrait of a Man Skimming a Book, Louvre, Paris;
- 1655: The Unmerciful Servant – The Wallace Collection, London, England;
- 1655: Geographer – Grohmann Museum, Milwaukee, United States
- 1655: Flute Player – Private Collection, Germany
- 1655: Bust of man wearing a large-brimmed hat – (c.1655), National Gallery of Art, Dublin, Ireland;
- c.1656 Young Man with a Flute – Scandinavia: Private Collection
- c.1657: Old Woman Teaching a Child – Hermitage Museum, St. Petersburg, Russia
- c.1658: Boy with a Recorder – Galleria Palatina, Florence, Italy;
- c.1659 The Oyster Seller – Louvre, Paris;
- c.1659: Mercury and Argus: Staatliche Kunstsammlungen – Gemäldegalerie Alte Meister, Dresden, Germany;
- 1659: St. Matthew and the Angel – North Carolina Museum of Art, Raleigh, North Carolina
- c.1659: Abraham Casting Out Hagar & Ishmael – Guilford College Collection, Greensboro, North Carolina
- c.1650: Self Portrait of the Artist as John the Evangelist, Bader Collection, Milwaukee;

Other paintings, date and owner presently unknown:

- Portrait of a woman at her window
- Young Man, Half-Length Seated, in a Red Jacket and Broad-Brimmed Cap
- Saint-John the Evangelist in a Landscape
- A Young Woman, Bust Length, Wearing Traditional Costume
- A soldier, buckling his belt, a helmet on a table nearby
- Portrait of a Geographer with compass, angle and globe (attributed to Willem Drost)
