= Hugh Ermen =

Hugh Ermen (1928–2009) was a British horticulturalist, considered one of the United Kingdom's leading amateur apple breeders. He specialised in breeding new apple varieties, especially own root trees, and was awarded the Royal Horticultural Society Associate of Honour in 1988 for his contributions to pomology.

== Varieties ==
The varieties he propagated at the Brogdale Horticultural Experimental Station include popular British garden apples such as:

- Core Blimey,
- Herefordshire Russet
- Jumbo
- Laura (ornamental)
- Limelight
- Red Devil
- Scrumptious
- Sweet Society
- White Star (ornamental)
- Winter Gem

Trees developed by Ermen, such as Scrumptious, have received the Royal Horticultural Society's Award of Garden Merit.

== Legacy ==
Ermen worked at the Ministry of Agriculture's National Fruit Trials at Brogdale in Kent until his retirement; this is where he began to advocate the use of own root fruit trees. He argued that the artificial propagation of two different types of tree created a degree of incompatibility. By growing the fruit tree on its own roots this incompatibility was removed and as a result the tree would be more healthy, live longer, and the fruit would have more flavour. Since the turn of the millennium this research has been adopted both commercially and academically with a view to producing healthier and longer living fruit trees.
