= French Catholic Academy =

The French Catholic Academy (Académie catholique de France) is a learned society founded in 2008 with the aim of addressing the challenges faced by Catholic intellectuals in contemporary France. Conceived by a group of academics, the Academy was established to foster a renewal of Catholic intellectual life in response to the decline of Catholic visibility in public debates and increasing secular challenges. The Academy's headquarters are located at the Collège des Bernardins in Paris, where its founding meeting took place on October 13, 2008. It serves as a forum for dialogue and research, drawing members from both clerical and lay backgrounds, emphasizing a collaborative approach to uphold and transmit the Christian intellectual heritage.

== Founding ==
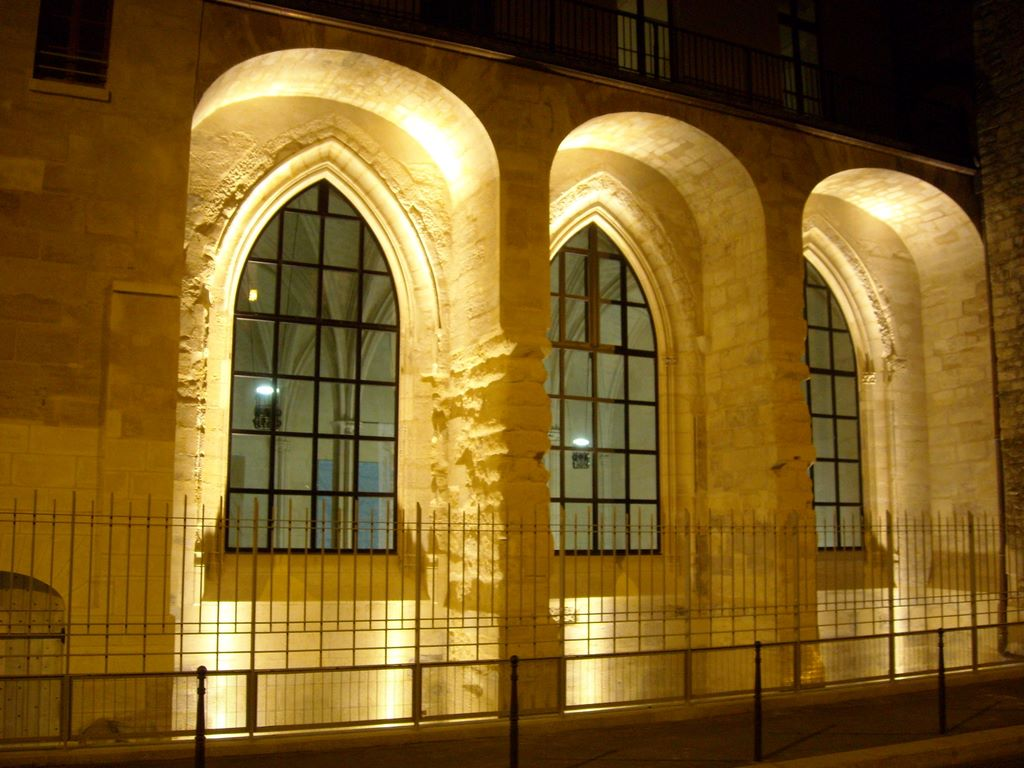
Collège des Bernardins, it houses the Académie catholique de France.

On July 11, 2008, a first meeting was held, bringing together personalities from magazines, associations and faculties. On October 13, 2008, a small committee was held at the Collège des Bernardins in Paris, which decided on the definitive name "Académie catholique de France".

In January 2009, the new office was constituted with priest and philosopher Philippe Capelle-Dumont as chairman, professor of immunologic medicine Edgardo D. Carosella and Father Jean-Robert Armogathe as vice-presidents, and professor and philosopher Pierre Manent. During this period, they organized the first meeting, during which the statutes and rules of procedure were adopted. In March 2009, the first meeting of the "Scientific Council" was held, and the first members of the "academic body" were elected. Inspired by the Catholic Academy of Mainz in Germany, the French Catholic Academy is composed of 70 clerics and laymen, with 84% of the academic body being laypeople.

=== Reasons and motivations for this initiative ===
The foundation of the French Catholic Academy was influenced by several factors, including scandals involving a minority of the 20th-century clergy and the growing anti-Catholic sentiment in Republican France. Nathalie Nabert, a medievalist, poet, honorary dean of the Faculty of Letters of the Catholic Institute of Paris, and a member of the academic body, described the establishment of the academy as a courageous challenge. She emphasized the serious and urgent need for a Catholic Academy of France, supported by the Faculty of Catholic Theology and the French School of Jerusalem (École biblique et archéologique française de Jérusalem).

The death of René Rémond was perceived by some as the end of the "Catholic intellectual." Rémond was a prominent Catholic engaged in political life, known for mediating between the Church, the Catholic laity, and secular society. He had previously expressed concerns about the silence of Catholic intellectuals in public debate.

The creation of the "Académie catholique de France" aims to address this need by working to transmit the Christian heritage and fostering openness and creativity.
