= Lucetta Scaraffia =

Italian historian (born 1948)

Lucetta Scaraffia (born 23 June 1948, in Turin) is an Italian historian and journalist, specialising in Christian and contemporary history. A lecturer at the Sapienza University of Rome, she was a recipient of the Legion of Honour in 2017.
