= Etting =

- Commune
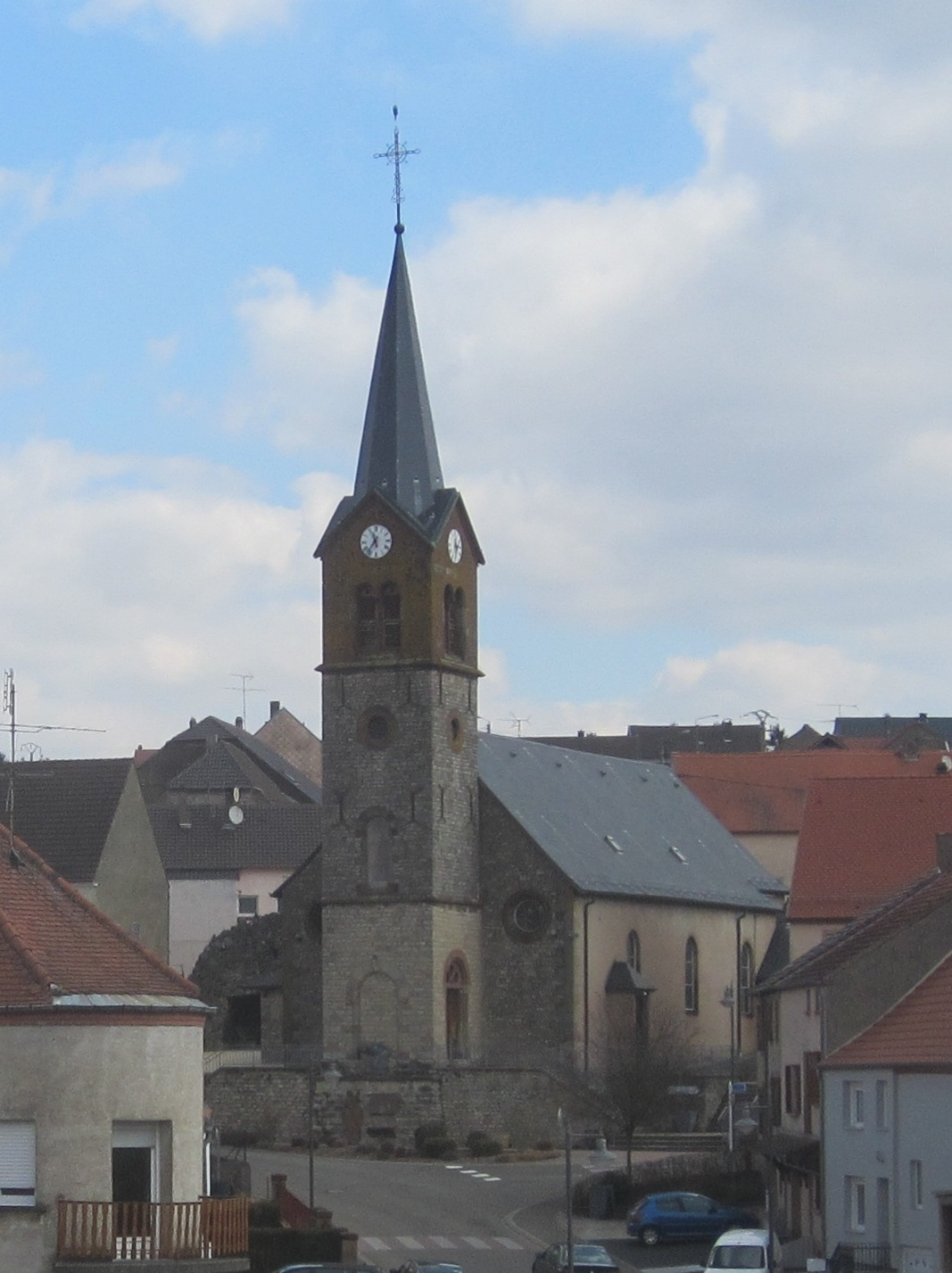
- The church in Etting

- Coat of arms
- Location of Etting
- Location within France Location within Grand Est
- Coordinates: 49°01′52″N 7°10′48″E
- Country: France
- Region: Grand Est
- Department: Moselle
- Arrondissement: Sarreguemines
- Canton: Bitche
- Intercommunality: CC du Pays de Bitche

Government
  - Mayor (2020–2026): Christian Bichelberger
- Area^{1}: 7.06 km^{2} (2.73 sq mi)
- Elevation: 309 m (1,014 ft)
- Highest elevation: 357 m (1,171 ft)
- Lowest elevation: 233 m (764 ft)
- Population (2023): 714
  - Density: 101/km^{2} (262/sq mi)
- Time zone: UTC+01:00 (CET)
  - Summer (DST): UTC+02:00 (CEST)
- INSEE/Postal code: 57201 /57412
- ^{1} French Land Register data, which excludes lakes, ponds, glaciers > 1 km^{2} (0.386 sq mi or 247 acres) and river estuaries.

Etting (French pronunciation: [etɛ̃]; German: Ettingen; Lorraine Franconian: Ettinge) is a commune in the Moselle department of the Grand Est administrative region in north-eastern France.

The village belongs to the Pays de Bitche.

== See also ==
- Communes of the Moselle department
