= Lieve Verschuier =

Dutch painter (1627–1686)

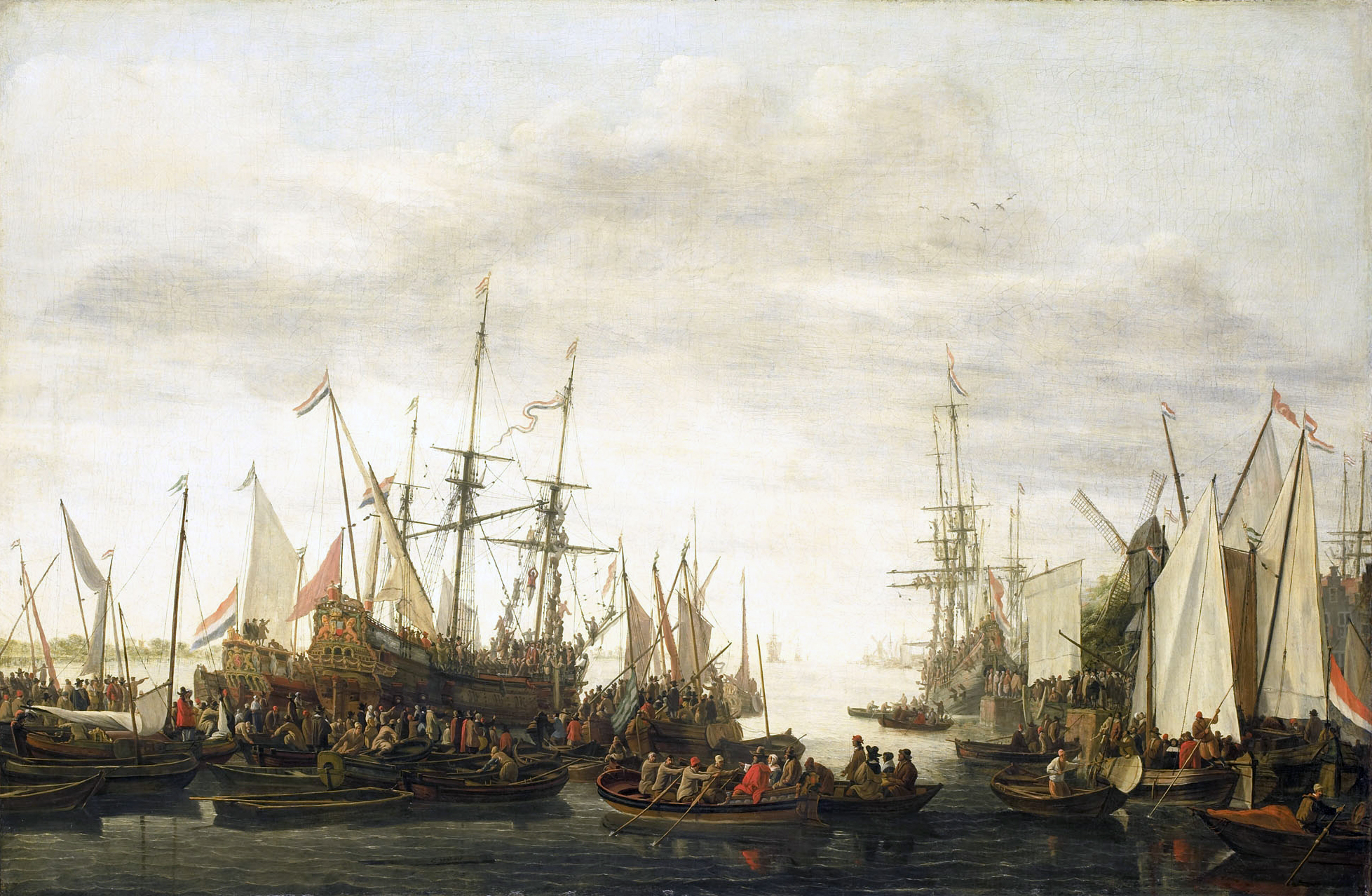
The keelhauling of the ships surgeon of admiral Jan van Nes, 1660 to 1686

Lieve Pietersz. Verschuier (1627–1686) was a Dutch Golden Age painter of maritime subjects.

== Biography ==
He was born in Rotterdam, and is documented in Amsterdam in 1651, where he possibly learned to paint from Simon de Vlieger. He traveled to Rome in 1653 as a young man with Jan Vermeer van Utrecht and became friends with Willem Drost and Johann Carl Loth. On his return he settled in Rotterdam in 1667 where he remained, painting marine scenes, and Italianate landscapes.

His maritime works are valued today for their historical value illustrating the art of shipbuilding in the 17th century.
