= Lieve Van Ermen =

Senator
- In office 28 June 2007 – June 2011

Personal details
- Born: 30 May 1948 (age 78) Borgerhout
- Party: Lijst Dedecker
- Website: www.lievevanermen.be

Lieve Van Ermen (born 30 May 1948) is a Flemish politician and cardiologist. She was directly elected to the Belgian Senate by the Dutch electoral college for the Dedecker List (Dutch: Lijst Dedecker) with 25,462 preferential votes in the 2007 federal election, which took place on 10 June 2007. From 2000 to 2006, she was a municipal councillor in Kalmthout for the Flemish Liberals and Democrats.
