= Lieven Boeve =

Belgian theologian

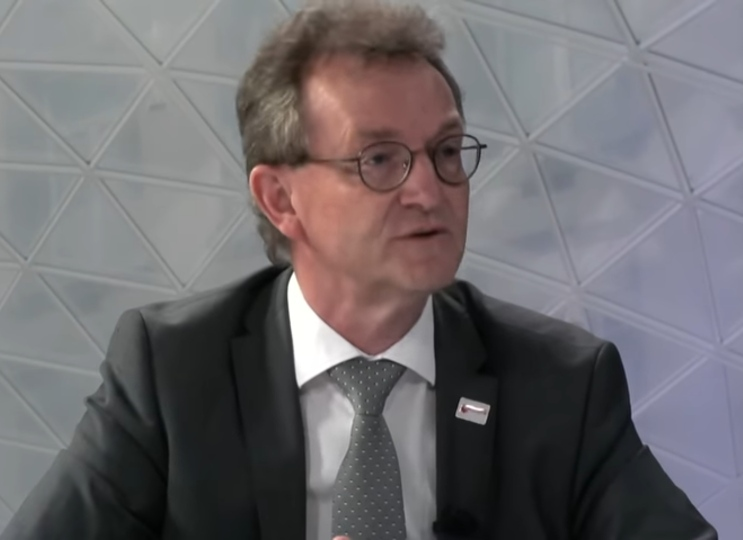
- Lieven Boeve in 2018
- Born: April 10, 1966 (age 60); Veurne, Belgium
- Occupation: Catholic theologian

Academic background
- Education: Catholic University of Leuven
- Influences: Edward Schillebeeckx; Johann Baptist Metz; Jean-François Lyotard; Richard Schaeffler; Paul Ricoeur

Academic work
- Discipline: Catholic theology
- Sub-discipline: Postmodern theology Contextual theology
- Notable ideas: Recontextualisation

Lieven Boeve (Dutch: [ˈlivə(n) ˈbuvə]; born April 10, 1966) is a Belgian Catholic theologian and full professor of Systematic Theology at the Faculty of Theology and Religious Studies of the Katholieke Universiteit Leuven. Since 2012, he has also held the chair of the Centre for Academic Teacher’s Training, KU Leuven. On 1 August 2014, he became the Director General of the Flemish Secretary for Catholic Education (Katholiek Onderwijs Vlaanderen), a position which he held for two five-year terms, until 2024.

== Research career ==
In 1995, Boeve obtained his doctoral degree in Theology with a dissertation on the reception of postmodernity in theology. In 1997, he became a part-time instructor at KU Leuven; in 1999, he became a full-time instructor. Between 1998 and 2003, he also lectured at the Faculty of Theology of the Université catholique de Louvain, Louvain-la-Neuve.

In 2000 he set up a research group Theology in a Postmodern Context, supporting about ten research and doctoral projects on a.o. the study of the ‘theological method’, Christian faith in the actual culture, and the relation between philosophy and theology. Meanwhile, he is also the coordinator of the GOA project on The Normativity of History, conducting historical-systematic research, and the interdisciplinary research group Anthropos.

From 2005 until 2009, Boeve was the international chair of the European Society of Catholic Theology.

In 2017 he was director-general of Catholic Education Flanders.

== Publications ==
In 2003, Boeve published Interrupting Tradition. An Essay on Christian Faith in a Postmondern Context, followed by a second more methodological work on the relation between theology and the actual context: God Interrupts History. Theology in a Time of Upheaval.

In 2013, he edited Tradition and the Normativity of History, together with Terrence Merrigan.

In 2014, he published Lyotard and Theology. Beyond the Christian master narrative of love.

In 2016, he continued his reflections on the relationship between theology and the postmodern society in Theology at the Crossroads of University, Church and Society, published in 2016, where he traces four models of Christian Identity in a Post-Christian society.

In 2019, he published The Gospel according to Lieven Boeve, a book on education.

He has also published several articles in scientific journals and books.

== Personal life ==
Lieven Boeve lives in Leuven together with his wife and three children.
