= Bathsheba (disambiguation) =

Bathsheba, in the Hebrew Bible, was the wife of Uriah the Hittite and later of David.

Bathsheba may also refer to:

== Arts and entertainment ==
- Bathsheba (Memling), a c. 1480 painting by Hans Memling
- Bathsheba (Gérôme), an 1889 painting by Jean-Léon Gérôme
- Bathsheba (Gentileschi), a 1636-37 painting by Artemisia Gentileschi
- Bathsheba Everdene, a fictional character in the novel Far from the Madding Crowd by Thomas Hardy

== Places ==
- Bathsheba, Barbados, a village
- Bathsheba, Oklahoma, United States, a ghost town

== People ==
- Bathsheba (given name)
- Bathsheba Bowers (1671–1718), American Quaker author and preacher
- Bathsheba Nell Crocker (born 1968), American diplomat
- Bathsheba Demuth, American environmental historian
- Bathsheba Doran, British-born playwright living in New York City
- Bathsheba Grossman (born 1966), American digital sculptor
- Bathsheba Ratzkoff, film director, producer, and editor
- Bathsheba W. Smith (1822–1910), early member of the Latter Day Saint movement
- Bathsheba Spooner (1746–1778), the first woman executed in the United States after the Declaration of Independence

== See also ==
- David and Bathsheba (disambiguation)
- Bethsabée, a 1947 French film
