= Basia (disambiguation) =

Basia (Basia Trzetrzelewska) is a Polish jazz singer-songwriter-producer.

Basia may also refer to:

== People ==
- Basia is a Slavic female first name, diminutive of Barbara. Spelling variant: Basya
  - Basia Bonkowski
  - Basia Bulat, Canadian singer-songwriter
  - Basia Frydman, Swedish actress
  - Basia Johnson, Polish humanitarian
- Basia Piasecka
  - Basia Wywerkówna, Polish actress
- Basia Makepe, Lesotho national football team player

=== Fictional characters ===
- Protagonist of Argument About Basia, a novel by Kornel Makuszyński
- Basia Wołodyjowska, from the novel Fire in the Steppe by Henryk Sienkiewicz

== Places ==
- Basia, Pakistan, a small village in Attock District, Punjab
- Basia block, a community development block in Gumla district, Jharkhand, India
- Basia, Gumla, a village in Jharkhand, India

== See also ==
- Basya (disambiguation)
