= 2001 in association football =

The following are the association football events of the year 2001 throughout the world.

== Events ==
- UEFA Champions League: Bayern Munich won 5–4 on penalties in the final against Valencia after a 1–1 draw at the end of the match. This was Bayern's 4th European Cup title.
- Copa Libertadores: Won by Boca Juniors after defeating Cruz Azul 3–1 on a penalty shootout after a final aggregate score of 1–1.
- UEFA Cup: Liverpool won 5–4 after extra-time in the final against Alavés with an unfortunate own goal/golden goal by Delfi Gelí. This was Liverpool's third UEFA Cup title.
- European Super Cup: Liverpool beat Bayern Munich 3–2, winning the cup for the second time.
- England – FA Cup: Liverpool beat Arsenal 2–1.
- Asian Champions Cup – South Korean side Suwon Samsung Bluewings won their first Asian Champions Cup crown defeating Jubilo Iwata 1–0. They also lifted the 2001 Asian Super Cup.
- July 9 – Real Madrid signed playmaker Zinedine Zidane of Juventus in a world record transfer of 72 million euros.
- FIFA Confederations Cup: France is the winner.
- February 16 – Dutch club Sparta Rotterdam fires manager Dolf Roks, who is replaced by former international Willem van Hanegem.
- April 11 – Australia broke the record for the largest win in an international match with a 31–0 win over American Samoa in the 2002 FIFA World Cup qualification match. Australian Archie Thompson also broke the record for most goals scored in an international match by scoring 13 goals in the match.
- June 24 – The Czech Republic's Moravia wins the second UEFA Regions' Cup, beating Portugal's Braga 4–2 on penalties, after drawing 2–2 after extra time, in Zlín.
- September 19 – Manager Jan van Dijk is fired by Dutch club Roda JC and replaced by Belgium's Georges Leekens.
- November 27 – Bayern Munich wins the Intercontinental Cup in Tokyo, Japan for the second time, by defeating titleholder Boca Juniors from Argentina: 1–0. The only goal for the Germans is scored by Ghanaian defender Sammy Kuffour.
- December 3 – Manager Ronald Koeman switches from Dutch club Vitesse Arnhem to Ajax. He is replaced by former player Edward Sturing.
- December 14 – Willem II fires manager Hans Verèl.

== Winners national club championship ==
=== Africa ===
- Egypt – Zamalek

=== Asia ===
- Iran – Esteghal
- Japan – Kashima Antlers
- Qatar – Al-Wakrah
- Singapore – Geylang United
- South Korea South Korea – Seongnam Ilhwa Chunma

=== Europe ===
- Croatia – Hajduk Split
- England – Manchester United
- France – Nantes
- Germany – Bayern Munich
- Italy – Roma
- Netherlands – PSV
- Portugal – Boavista
- Scotland – Celtic
- Spain – Real Madrid
- Turkey – Fenerbahçe
- FR Yugoslavia – Red Star Belgrade

=== North America ===
- Canada – St. Catharines Wolves (CPSL)
- Mexico
  - Verano – Santos
  - Invierno – Pachuca
- United States – San Jose Earthquakes (MLS)

=== South America ===
- Argentina
  - Clausura – San Lorenzo
  - Apertura – Racing Club
- Bolivia – Oriente Petrolero
- Brazil – Atlético Paranaense
- Ecuador – Emelec
- Paraguay– Cerro Porteño
- Peru -Club Alianza Lima

== International tournaments ==
- UNCAF Nations Cup in Honduras (May 23 – June 3, 2001)
  1. Guatemala
  2. Costa Rica
  3. El Salvador
- Baltic Cup in Riga, Latvia (July 3 – 5 2001)
  1. Latvia
  2. Lithuania
  3. Estonia
- Copa América in Colombia (July 11–29, 2001)
  1. Colombia
  2. Mexico
  3. Honduras
- FIFA U-20 World Cup in Argentina (June 17 – July 8, 2001)
  1. Argentina
  2. Ghana
  3. Egypt
- FIFA U-17 World Championship in Trinidad and Tobago (September 13–30, 2001)
  1. France
  2. Nigeria
  3. Burkina Faso

== Movies ==
- Shaolin Soccer (Hong Kong)

== Births ==
- 4 January – Odilon Kossounou, Ivorian footballer
- 5 January – Mykhailo Mudryk, Ukrainian footballer
- 9 January
  - Eric García, Spanish international
  - Rodrygo Goes, Brazilian international
- 14 January – Myron Boadu, Dutch international
- 16 January – Agustín Sández, Argentine club footballer
- 17 January – Enzo Fernández, Argentine international
- 11 February – Bryan Gil, Spanish international
- 12 February – Khvicha Kvaratskhelia, Georgian international
- 19 February – Lee Kang-in, South Korean international
- 17 March – Pietro Pellegri, Italian under-19 international
- 9 April – Sinaly Diomandé, Ivorian footballer
- 11 April – Manuel Ugarte, Uruguayan international footballer
- 13 April
  - Jorn van Hedel, Dutch professional footballer
  - Neco Williams, Welsh international
- 18 April – Santiago Giménez, Mexican international
- 19 April – Micky van de Ven, Dutch youth international
- 26 April – Thiago Almada, Argentine footballer
- 8 May – Jordyn Huitema, Canadian women's international
- 9 May – Matko Miljevic, US youth international
- 23 May – Brennan Johnson, Welsh international
- 30 May – Patrick Wimmer, Austrian international
- 17 June – Jurriën Timber, Dutch international
- 18 June – Gabriel Martinelli, Brazilian international
- 20 June
  - Gonçalo Ramos, Portuguese footballer
  - Nicolas Jackson, Senegalese international
- 23 June – Batya Bagully, Kazakhstani footballer
- 29 June – Allahyar Sayyadmanesh, Iranian footballer
- 5 August – Ethan Laird, English youth international
- 27 August – Julie Blakstad, Norwegian professional footballer
- 12 September – Ayoub Ezzaytouni, French professional footballer
- 15 September – Kevin Larsson, Finnish professional footballer
- 20 September – Johnny Cardoso, US international
- 1 October – Mason Greenwood, English under-21 international
- 3 October – Liel Abada, Israeli international
- 8 October – Witan Sulaeman, Indonesian footballer
- 29 October – Beckham Putra, Indonesian youth international
- 2 November – Moisés Caicedo, Ecuadorian footballer
- 30 November – Jordan Carrillo, Mexican footballer
- 17 December – Abde Ezzalzouli, Moroccan footballer
- 20 December – Facundo Pellistri, Uruguayan footballer

== Deaths ==
=== February ===
- 14 February – Domènec Balmanya (86), Spanish footballer and manager

=== April ===
- 5 April – Aldo Olivieri, Italian goalkeeper, winner of the 1938 FIFA World Cup. (90)

=== May ===
- 8 May – Luis Rijo, Uruguayan striker, winner of the 1950 FIFA World Cup. (73)
- 12 May – Didì, Brazilian forward, winner of the 1958 FIFA World Cup and 1962 FIFA World Cup . (72)
- 31 May – Otto Hemele (75), Czech footballer

=== July ===
- 6 July – Enrique Mateos (69), Spanish footballer
- 17 July – Wilhelm Simetsreiter (86), German footballer

=== August ===
- 3 August – Mario Perazzolo, Italian defender, winner of the 1938 FIFA World Cup. (90)

=== November ===
- 1 November – Serge Mésones (53), French footballer

=== December ===
- 12 December – Josef Bican (88), Austrian and Czechoslovak footballer and manager
