= Basya (given name) =

Feminine given name

Basya or Basia is a feminine given name of multiple origins. It may be a Polish diminutive of the name Barbara, commonly spelled as Basia.

As a Jewish name, particularly in Yiddish, it is diminutive of the biblical name Bathsheba or a variant of the biblical name of the unnamed Pharaoh's daughter, who was later given various names including Batya or Batia (Hebrew: בתיה). It is also sometimes used as a diminutive of the given name Benedicta.

Notable people with the name include:

== Basya ==
- Basya Cohen (Betty Comden)
- Basya Schechter
- Benedicta Solomonovna "Basya" Kramarova, mother of Russian-American actor Savely Kramarov

== Batia ==
- Batia Apollo (1946–2018), Israeli painter
- Bathja Bayer (1928 –1995), Israeli musicologist
- Batia Brenner (1894–1975), Israeli kibbutznik
- Bathia Churgin (born 1928), Israeli musicologist
- Batia Disenchik, Israeli model
- Batia Grossbard (1910–1995), Israeli painter
- Batia Holin (born 1953), Israeli photographer
- Batia Kolton (born 1967), Israeli illustrator
- Batia Lancet (1922–2019), Israeli actress
- Batia Lishansky (1900–1992), Israeli sculptor
- Batia Makov (1841–1911), one of the founders of Rehovot
- Batia Malka (born 1981), Israeli sculptor
- Batia Masnikov, Israeli gymnast
- Batia Mishani (born 1945), Israeli Paralympian
- Batia Mittelman (1891–1931), member of the Old Yishuv
- Batia Ofer (born 1974), Israeli-Canadian philanthropist
- Batia Shweiki (born 1953), Israeli Paralympian
- Batia Steinbock (born 1961), Israeli pianist
- Batia Temkin-Berman (1907–1952), Polish-Israeli archivist and activist
- Batia Wang (born 1945), Israeli jewelry designer

== Batya ==
- Batya Bagully (born 2001), Kazakhstani footballer
- Batya Friedman, American professor
- Batya Frost (1938–2025), Israeli interpreter
- Batya Gur (1947–2005), Israeli writer
- Batya Kahane (1901–1978), Israeli writer
- Batya Kahane-Dror (born 1964), Israeli lawyer and activist
- Batya Kristal (born 1951), Israeli nephrologist
- Batya Orni (1933–2020), Israeli air navigator
- Batya Ouziel (1934–2018), Israeli television craftsman
- Batya Rosenak (born 1965), Israeli artist
- Batya Rosenthal (born 1956), Israeli actress
- Batya Segal (born 1969), Israeli set designer
- Batya Svirsky Malul (born 1957), Israeli architect
- Batya Ungar-Sargon (born 1981), American journalist
- Batya Weinbaum (born 1952), American writer

== See also ==
- Basia (disambiguation)
- Batya (film)
