= 2000–01 Football League =

102nd season of the Football League

The Football League
- Season: 2000–01
- Champions: Fulham
- Promoted: Fulham; Blackburn Rovers; Bolton Wanderers
- Relegated: Barnet
- New team in League: Kidderminster Harriers

The 2000–01 Football League (known as the Nationwide Football League for sponsorship reasons) was the 102nd completed season of The Football League.

== First Division ==
First Division
- Season: 2000–01
- Champions: Fulham
- Promoted: Fulham; Blackburn Rovers; Bolton Wanderers
- Relegated: Huddersfield Town; Queens Park Rangers; Tranmere Rovers
- Matches: 552
- Goals: 1,373 (2.49 per match)
- Top goalscorer: Louis Saha (27 goals)

=== Team changes ===
The following teams changed division since the 1999–2000 season.

==== From First Division ====
Promoted to FA Premier League

- Charlton Athletic
- Manchester City
- Ipswich Town

Relegated to Second Division

- Walsall
- Port Vale
- Swindon Town

==== To First Division ====
Promoted from Second Division

- Preston North End
- Burnley
- Gillingham

Relegated from FA Premier League

- Wimbledon
- Sheffield Wednesday
- Watford

Pos	Team	Pld	W	D	L	GF	GA	GD	Pts	Qualification or relegation
1	Fulham (C, P)	46	30	11	5	90	32	+58	101	Promotion to the Premier League
2	Blackburn Rovers (P)	46	26	13	7	76	39	+37	91	Promotion to the Premier League
3	Bolton Wanderers (O, P)	46	24	15	7	76	45	+31	87	Qualification for the First Division play-offs
4	Preston North End	46	23	9	14	64	52	+12	78	Qualification for the First Division play-offs
5	Birmingham City	46	23	9	14	59	48	+11	78	Qualification for the First Division play-offs
6	West Bromwich Albion	46	21	11	14	60	52	+8	74	Qualification for the First Division play-offs
7	Burnley	46	21	9	16	50	54	−4	72	
8	Wimbledon	46	17	18	11	71	50	+21	69	
9	Watford	46	20	9	17	76	67	+9	69	
10	Sheffield United	46	19	11	16	52	49	+3	68	
11	Nottingham Forest	46	20	8	18	55	53	+2	68	
12	Wolverhampton Wanderers	46	14	13	19	45	48	−3	55	
13	Gillingham	46	13	16	17	61	66	−5	55	
14	Crewe Alexandra	46	15	10	21	47	62	−15	55	
15	Norwich City	46	14	12	20	46	58	−12	54	
16	Barnsley	46	15	9	22	49	62	−13	54	
17	Sheffield Wednesday	46	15	8	23	52	71	−19	53	
18	Grimsby Town	46	14	10	22	43	62	−19	52	
19	Stockport County	46	11	18	17	58	65	−7	51	
20	Portsmouth	46	10	19	17	47	59	−12	49	
21	Crystal Palace	46	12	13	21	57	70	−13	49	
22	Huddersfield Town (R)	46	11	15	20	48	57	−9	48	Relegation to the Second Division
23	Queens Park Rangers (R)	46	7	19	20	45	75	−30	40	Relegation to the Second Division
24	Tranmere Rovers (R)	46	9	11	26	46	77	−31	38	Relegation to the Second Division

Rules for classification: 1) Points; 2) Goal difference; 3) Goals scored
(C) Champions; (O) Play-off winners; (P) Promoted; (R) Relegated

=== Play-offs ===
Semifinals; 1st leg –May 13th; 2nd leg –May 17th, 2001
3rd	Bolton Wanderers	2	3	5
6th	West Bromwich Albion	2	0	2
4th	Preston North End (pen.)	0	2	2 (4)
5th	Birmingham City	1	1	2 (2)

Final at Millennium Stadium, Cardiff; May 28th, 2001
3rd	Bolton Wanderers	3
4th	Preston North End	0

=== Results ===
Home \ Away	BAR	BIR	BLB	BOL	BUR	CRE	CRY	FUL	GIL	GRI	HUD	NWC	NOT	POR	PNE	QPR	SHU	SHW	STP	TRA	WAT	WBA	WDN	WOL
Barnsley		2–3	1–2	0–1	1–0	3–0	1–0	0–0	3–1	2–0	3–1	1–0	3–4	1–0	0–4	4–2	0–0	1–0	0–2	1–1	0–1	4–1	0–1	1–2
Birmingham City	4–1		0–2	1–1	3–2	2–0	2–1	1–3	1–0	1–0	2–1	2–1	0–2	0–0	3–1	0–0	1–0	1–2	4–0	2–0	2–0	2–1	0–3	0–1
Blackburn Rovers	0–0	2–1		1–1	5–0	1–0	2–0	1–2	1–2	2–0	2–0	3–2	3–0	3–1	3–2	0–0	1–1	2–0	2–1	3–2	3–4	1–0	1–1	1–0
Bolton Wanderers	2–0	2–2	1–4		1–1	4–1	3–3	0–2	3–3	2–2	2–2	1–0	0–0	2–0	2–0	3–1	1–1	2–0	1–1	2–0	2–1	0–1	2–2	2–1
Burnley	2–1	0–0	0–2	0–2		1–0	1–2	2–1	1–1	1–1	1–0	2–0	1–0	1–1	3–0	2–1	2–0	1–0	2–1	2–1	2–0	1–1	1–0	1–2
Crewe Alexandra	2–2	0–2	0–0	2–1	4–2		1–1	1–2	2–1	2–0	1–0	0–0	1–0	1–0	1–3	2–2	1–0	1–0	1–2	3–1	2–0	0–1	0–4	2–0
Crystal Palace	1–0	1–2	2–3	0–2	0–1	1–0		0–2	2–2	0–1	0–0	1–1	2–3	2–3	0–2	1–1	0–1	4–1	2–2	3–2	1–0	2–2	3–1	0–2
Fulham	5–1	0–1	2–1	1–1	3–1	2–0	3–1		3–0	2–1	3–0	2–0	1–0	3–1	0–1	2–0	1–1	1–1	4–1	3–1	5–0	0–0	1–1	2–0
Gillingham	0–0	1–2	1–1	2–2	0–0	0–1	4–1	0–2		1–0	2–1	4–3	1–3	1–1	4–0	0–1	4–1	2–0	1–3	2–1	0–3	1–2	0–0	1–0
Grimsby Town	0–2	1–1	1–4	0–1	1–0	1–3	2–2	1–0	1–0		1–0	2–0	0–2	2–1	1–2	3–1	0–1	0–1	1–1	3–1	2–1	2–0	1–1	0–2
Huddersfield Town	1–1	1–2	0–1	2–3	0–1	3–1	1–2	1–2	2–3	0–0		2–0	1–1	4–1	0–0	2–1	2–1	0–0	0–0	3–0	1–2	0–2	0–2	3–0
Norwich City	0–0	1–0	1–1	0–2	2–3	1–1	0–0	0–1	1–0	2–1	1–1		0–0	0–0	1–2	1–0	4–2	1–0	4–0	1–0	2–1	0–1	1–2	1–0
Nottingham Forest	1–0	1–2	2–1	0–2	5–0	1–0	0–3	0–3	0–1	3–1	1–3	0–0		2–0	3–1	1–1	2–0	0–1	1–0	3–1	0–2	1–0	1–2	0–0
Portsmouth	3–0	1–1	2–2	1–2	2–0	2–1	2–4	1–1	0–0	1–1	1–1	2–0	0–2		0–1	1–1	0–0	2–1	2–1	2–0	1–3	0–1	2–1	3–1
Preston North End	1–2	0–2	0–1	0–2	2–1	2–1	2–0	1–1	0–0	1–2	0–0	1–0	1–1	1–0		5–0	3–0	2–0	1–1	1–0	3–2	2–1	1–1	2–0
Queens Park Rangers	2–0	0–0	1–3	1–1	0–1	1–0	1–1	0–2	2–2	0–1	1–1	2–3	1–0	1–1	0–0		1–3	1–2	0–3	2–0	1–1	2–0	2–1	2–2
Sheffield United	1–2	3–1	2–0	1–0	2–0	1–0	1–0	1–1	1–2	3–2	3–0	1–1	1–3	2–0	3–2	1–1		1–1	1–0	2–0	0–1	2–0	0–1	1–0
Sheffield Wednesday	2–1	1–0	1–1	0–3	2–0	0–0	4–1	3–3	2–1	1–0	2–3	3–2	0–1	0–0	1–3	5–2	1–2		2–4	1–0	2–3	1–2	0–5	0–1
Stockport County	2–0	2–0	0–0	4–3	0–0	3–0	0–1	2–0	2–2	1–1	0–0	1–3	1–2	1–1	0–1	2–2	0–2	2–1		1–1	2–3	0–0	2–2	1–1
Tranmere Rovers	2–3	1–0	1–1	0–1	2–3	1–3	1–1	1–4	3–2	2–0	2–0	0–1	2–2	1–1	1–1	1–1	1–0	2–0	2–1		2–0	2–2	0–4	0–2
Watford	1–0	2–0	0–1	1–0	0–1	3–0	2–2	1–3	0–0	4–0	1–2	4–1	3–0	2–2	2–3	3–1	4–1	1–3	2–2	1–1		3–3	3–1	3–2
West Bromwich Albion	1–0	1–1	1–0	0–2	1–1	2–2	1–0	1–3	3–1	0–1	1–1	2–3	3–0	2–0	3–1	2–1	2–1	1–2	1–1	2–1	3–0		3–1	1–0
Wimbledon	1–1	3–1	0–2	0–1	0–2	3–3	1–0	0–3	4–4	2–2	1–1	0–0	2–1	1–1	3–1	5–0	0–0	4–1	2–0	0–0	0–0	0–1		1–1
Wolverhampton Wanderers	2–0	0–1	0–0	0–2	1–0	0–0	1–3	0–0	1–1	2–0	0–1	4–0	2–0	1–1	0–1	1–1	0–0	1–1	3–2	1–2	2–2	3–1	0–1	

Legend: Blue = home team win; Yellow = draw; Red = away team win.

=== Top scorers ===
Rank	Player	Club	Goals
1	(France) Louis Saha	Fulham	27
2	(England) Matt Jansen	Blackburn Rovers	23
3	(England) Lee Hughes	West Bromwich Albion	21
4	(Jamaica) Jason Euell	Wimbledon	19
=	(Republic of Ireland) Jon Macken	Preston North End	19
=	(England) Michael Ricketts	Bolton Wanderers	19
5	(Portugal) Luis Boa Morte	Fulham	18
=	(Jamaica) Barry Hayles	Fulham	18

=== Maps ===
Locations of the Football League First Division 2000–2001 teams
Locations of the Football League First Division London teams 2000–2001

=== Attendances ===
#	Club	Average
1	Birmingham City	21,283
2	Blackburn Rovers	20,740
3	Nottingham Forest	20,615
4	Sheffield Wednesday	19,268
5	Wolverhampton Wanderers	19,258
6	West Bromwich Albion	17,657
7	Sheffield United	17,211
8	Crystal Palace	17,061
9	Norwich City	16,525
10	Burnley	16,234
11	Bolton Wanderers	16,062
12	Fulham	14,985
13	Preston North End	14,617
14	Barnsley	14,465
15	Watford	13,941
16	Portsmouth	13,533
17	Huddersfield Town	12,808
18	Queens Park Rangers	12,013
19	Gillingham	9,293
20	Tranmere Rovers	9,049
21	Wimbledon	7,901
22	Stockport County	7,031
23	Crewe Alexandra	6,698
24	Grimsby Town	5,646

== Second Division ==
Football League, Second Division
- Season: 2000–01
- Champions: Millwall (1st third tier title)
- Direct promotion: Millwall, Rotherham United
- Promoted through play-offs: Walsall
- Relegated: Bristol Rovers, Luton Town, Oxford United, Swansea City
- Matches: 552
- Goals: 1,466 (2.66 per match)
- Top goalscorer: Neil Harris (Millwall), 27

=== Team changes ===
The following teams changed division since the 1999–2000 season.

==== From Second Division ====
Promoted to First Division

- Preston North End
- Burnley
- Gillingham

Relegated to Third Division

- Cardiff City
- Blackpool
- Scunthorpe United
- Chesterfield

==== To Second Division ====
Promoted from Third Division

- Swansea City
- Rotherham United
- Northampton Town
- Peterborough United

Relegated from First Division

- Walsall
- Port Vale
- Swindon Town

Pos	Team	Pld	W	D	L	GF	GA	GD	Pts	Qualification or relegation
1	Millwall (C, P)	46	28	9	9	89	38	+51	93	Promotion to Football League First Division
2	Rotherham United (P)	46	27	10	9	79	55	+24	91	Promotion to Football League First Division
3	Reading	46	25	11	10	86	52	+34	86	Qualification for the Second Division play-offs
4	Walsall (O, P)	46	23	12	11	79	50	+29	81	Qualification for the Second Division play-offs
5	Stoke City	46	21	14	11	74	49	+25	77	Qualification for the Second Division play-offs
6	Wigan Athletic	46	19	18	9	53	42	+11	75	Qualification for the Second Division play-offs
7	Bournemouth	46	20	13	13	79	55	+24	73	
8	Notts County	46	19	12	15	62	66	−4	69	
9	Bristol City	46	18	14	14	70	56	+14	68	
10	Wrexham	46	17	12	17	65	71	−6	63	
11	Port Vale	46	16	14	16	55	49	+6	62	
12	Peterborough United	46	15	14	17	61	66	−5	59	
13	Wycombe Wanderers	46	15	14	17	46	53	−7	59	
14	Brentford	46	14	17	15	56	70	−14	59	
15	Oldham Athletic	46	15	13	18	53	65	−12	58	
16	Bury	46	16	10	20	45	59	−14	58	
17	Colchester United	46	15	12	19	55	59	−4	57	
18	Northampton Town	46	15	12	19	46	59	−13	57	
19	Cambridge United	46	14	11	21	61	77	−16	53	
20	Swindon Town	46	13	13	20	47	65	−18	52	
21	Bristol Rovers (R)	46	12	15	19	53	57	−4	51	Relegation to Football League Third Division
22	Luton Town (R)	46	9	13	24	52	80	−28	40	Relegation to Football League Third Division
23	Swansea City (R)	46	8	13	25	47	73	−26	37	Relegation to Football League Third Division
24	Oxford United (R)	46	7	6	33	53	100	−47	27	Relegation to Football League Third Division

Rules for classification: 1) Points; 2) Goal difference; 3) Goals scored
(C) Champions; (O) Play-off winners; (P) Promoted; (R) Relegated

=== Play-offs ===
Semifinals; 1st leg –May 13th; 2nd leg –May 16th, 2001
3rd	Reading	0	2	2
6th	Wigan Athletic	0	1	1
4th	Walsall	0	4	4
5th	Stoke City	0	2	2

Final at Millennium Stadium, Cardiff; May 27th, 2001
3rd	Reading	2
4th	Walsall (a.e.t.)	3

=== Maps ===
Locations of the Football League Second Division 2000–2001 teams
Locations of the Football League Second Division London teams 2000–2001

== Third Division ==
Football League, Third Division
- Season: 2000–01
- Champions: Brighton & Hove Albion (2nd fourth tier title)
- Direct promotion: Brighton & Hove Albion, Cardiff City, Chesterfield
- Promoted through play-offs: Blackpool
- Relegated to Conference: Barnet
- New club in the league: Kidderminster Harriers
- Matches: 552
- Goals: 1,397 (2.53 per match)
- Top goalscorer: Bobby Zamora (Brighton & Hove Albion), 28

=== Team changes ===
The following teams changed division since the 1999–2000 season.

==== From Third Division ====
Promoted to Second Division

- Swansea City
- Rotherham United
- Northampton Town
- Peterborough United

Relegated to Football Conference

- Chester City

==== To Third Division ====
Promoted from Football Conference

- Kidderminster Harriers

Relegated from Second Division

- Cardiff City
- Blackpool
- Scunthorpe United
- Chesterfield

Pos	Team	Pld	W	D	L	GF	GA	GD	Pts	Qualification or relegation
1	Brighton & Hove Albion (C, P)	46	28	8	10	73	35	+38	92	Promotion to Football League Second Division
2	Cardiff City (P)	46	23	13	10	95	58	+37	82	Promotion to Football League Second Division
3	Chesterfield (P)	46	25	14	7	79	42	+37	80 (Note: Chesterfield had 9 points deducted.)	Promotion to Football League Second Division
4	Hartlepool United	46	21	14	11	71	54	+17	77	Qualification for the Third Division play-offs
5	Leyton Orient	46	20	15	11	59	51	+8	75	Qualification for the Third Division play-offs
6	Hull City	46	19	17	10	47	39	+8	74	Qualification for the Third Division play-offs
7	Blackpool (O, P)	46	22	6	18	74	58	+16	72	Qualification for the Third Division play-offs
8	Rochdale	46	18	17	11	59	48	+11	71	
9	Cheltenham Town	46	18	14	14	59	52	+7	68	
10	Scunthorpe United	46	18	11	17	62	52	+10	65	
11	Southend United	46	15	18	13	55	53	+2	63	
12	Plymouth Argyle	46	15	13	18	54	61	−7	58	
13	Mansfield Town	46	15	13	18	64	72	−8	58	
14	Macclesfield Town	46	14	14	18	51	62	−11	56	
15	Shrewsbury Town	46	15	10	21	49	65	−16	55	
16	Kidderminster Harriers	46	13	14	19	47	61	−14	53	
17	York City	46	13	13	20	42	63	−21	52	
18	Lincoln City	46	12	15	19	58	66	−8	51	
19	Exeter City	46	12	14	20	40	58	−18	50	
20	Darlington	46	12	13	21	44	56	−12	49	
21	Torquay United	46	12	13	21	52	77	−25	49	
22	Carlisle United	46	11	15	20	42	65	−23	48	
23	Halifax Town	46	12	11	23	54	68	−14	47	
24	Barnet (R)	46	12	9	25	67	81	−14	45	Relegation to Football Conference

Rules for classification: 1) Points; 2) Goal difference; 3) Goals scored
(C) Champions; (O) Play-off winners; (P) Promoted; (R) Relegated

=== Play-offs ===
Semifinals; 1st leg –May 13th; 2nd leg –May 16th, 2001
4th	Hartlepool United	0	1	1
7th	Blackpool	2	3	5
5th	Leyton Orient	0	2	2
6th	Hull City	1	0	1

Final at Wembley Stadium; May 26th, 2001
5th	Leyton Orient	2
7th	Blackpool	4

=== Maps ===
Locations of the Football League Third Division teams 2000–2001
Locations of the Football League Third Division London teams 2000–2001

== See also ==
- 2000–01 in English football
- 2000 in association football
- 2001 in association football
