= Bathsheba (given name) =

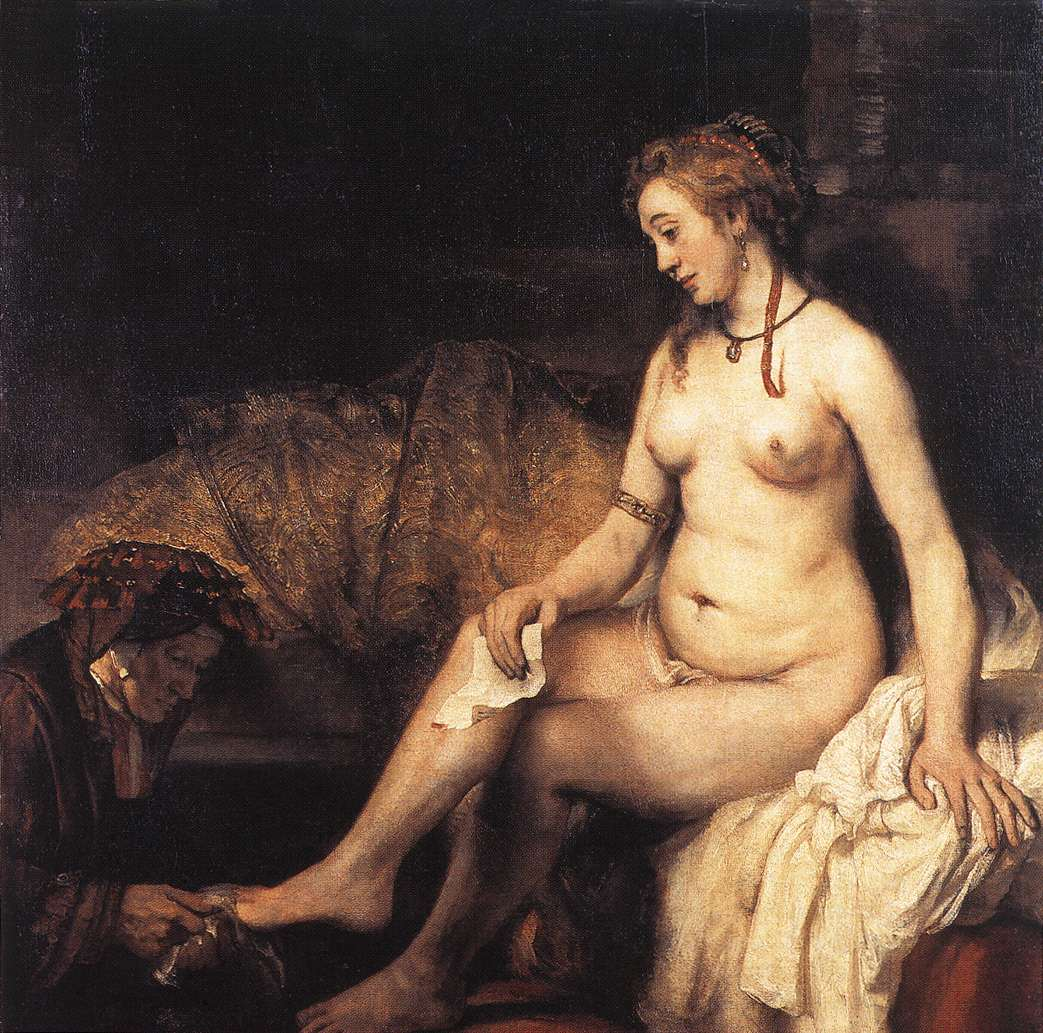
- Bathsheba at Her Bath by Rembrandt, 1654
- Pronunciation: (/bæθˈʃiːbə, ˈbæθʃɪbə/)
- Gender: Feminine
- Language: Hebrew

Origin
- Meaning: “Daughter of the oath,” “daughter of seven”

Other names
- Nicknames: Basya, Batya, Sheba
- Related names: Barsabeh, Batšeba, Batŝeba, Batșeba, Batseba, Bathsabeh, Batsheva, Batsjêba, Batszeba, Batxeba, Bethsabée, Betsabe, Betsabé, Betsabeé

Bathsheba (/bæθˈʃiːbə, ˈbæθʃɪbə/; Hebrew: בַּת־שֶׁבַע Baṯ-šeḇaʿ) is a feminine given name of Hebrew origin meaning “daughter of the oath” or “daughter of seven.” It is often given in reference to the Biblical character Bathsheba.

== Women ==
- Bathsheba A. Benedict (1809–1897), American Baptist and philanthropist
- Bathsheba Bowers (1671–1718), American Quaker author and preacher
- Bathsheba Nell Crocker (born 1968), American diplomat
- Bathsheba Demuth, American environmental historian
- Bathsheba Doran, British dramatist and playwright
- Bathsheba Grossman (born 1966), American artist
- Bathsheba Okwenje (born 1973), Ugandan visual and installation artist
- Bathsheba Ratzkoff, American film director, producer, and editor
- Bathsheba W. Smith (1822–1910), American Mormon leader
- Bathsheba Spooner (1746–1778), American woman executed for murder
