= Nathan's parable =

Parable told by the prophet Nathan to King David

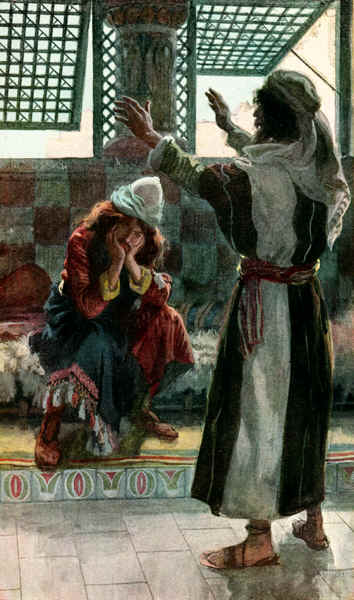
Nathan Rebukes David by James Tissot, c. 1896–1902

Nathan's parable, also called the parable of the ewe lamb or the poor man's lamb (Hebrew: כִּבְשַׂת הָרָשׁ, romanized: Kivsat ha-rash), is a parable in the Hebrew Bible, told by the prophet Nathan to King David in 2 Samuel 12:1–4. Nathan presents it as a legal case about a rich man who takes the only lamb of his poor neighbor. When David condemns the rich man, Nathan replies "Thou art the man" and reveals that the story is about David's own adultery with Bathsheba and the killing of her husband, Uriah the Hittite.

The story is the standard example of what the biblical scholar Uriel Simon called a "juridical parable", a realistic story about a breach of law told to someone guilty of a similar offense, so that he passes judgment on himself without realizing it. Nathan's line entered English as a proverbial accusation, and in Modern Hebrew "the poor man's lamb" is an idiom for the one possession of a poor person, taken by someone who already has plenty.

"David is rebuked by Nathan for his adultery and confesses his sin" (Maerten de Vos, 16th century)

== Background ==
In 2 Samuel 11, David stays in Jerusalem while his army besieges Rabbah. He sees Bathsheba bathing, has her brought to the palace and sleeps with her, and she becomes pregnant. After failing to make it look as though the child was Uriah's, David has Joab place Uriah in the front line, where he is killed. David then marries Bathsheba. The chapter closes by stating that what David had done displeased God, who sends Nathan to him.

== Parable ==
There were two men in one city; the one rich, and the other poor. The rich man had exceeding many flocks and herds: But the poor man had nothing, save one little ewe lamb, which he had bought and nourished up: and it grew up together with him, and with his children; it did eat of his own meat, and drank of his own cup, and lay in his bosom, and was unto him as a daughter. And there came a traveller unto the rich man, and he spared to take of his own flock and of his own herd, to dress for the wayfaring man that was come unto him; but took the poor man's lamb, and dressed it for the man that was come to him.

— 2 Samuel 12:1–4

David, taking the story as a real case, swears that the rich man deserves to die and must repay the lamb fourfold "because he had no pity" (2 Samuel 12:5–6). The fourfold payment matches the law on stolen sheep in Exodus 22:1, although the death sentence goes beyond it. The Septuagint reads "sevenfold" instead of "fourfold".

Nathan answers "Thou art the man" (2 Samuel 12:7) and delivers an oracle: the sword will never depart from David's house, and his wives will be taken publicly by another man, a threat later fulfilled in Absalom's revolt (2 Samuel 16:22). David confesses, "I have sinned against the LORD" (2 Samuel 12:13). Nathan tells him that he will not die, but that the child born to Bathsheba will. The child dies on the seventh day, and Bathsheba later gives birth to Solomon.

== Interpretation ==
The first part of the story (2 Samuel 12:1–4) in the Leningrad Codex (Cairo, 1008 CE). The phrase "Nathan to David" (Nāṯān ’el-Dāwiḏ) is visible at the top left.

=== Juridical parable ===
Uriel Simon argued that a juridical parable only works if the hearer does not see through it too early, so the resemblance to the real offense has to be partial. He grouped Nathan's parable with the story of the wise woman of Tekoa (2 Samuel 14:1–20), the prophet's disguise in 1 Kings 20:35–43 and the Song of the Vineyard in Isaiah 5:1–7. George W. Coats discussed it alongside the other embedded stories of the Succession Narrative.

=== Mismatch between parable and crime ===
Commentators have long noted that the parable describes a theft, while David committed adultery and murder. Readings differ on whom the lamb stands for. The most common view identifies it with Bathsheba, taken from her husband. Others identify it with Uriah, sent to his death, and Yael Landman has argued that the lamb, raised "as a daughter", also points to the child David tried to pass off as Uriah's. Joshua Berman has read the parable as deliberately double in meaning, so that its details fit more than one part of the story at once. More recent work, including that of Ken Stone, has looked at the chapter through affect theory and animal studies, focusing on the lamb's place in the poor man's household.

=== Rabbinic interpretation ===
The Babylonian Talmud records the view of Rabbi Samuel bar Nahmani that "whoever says David sinned is mistaken", on the grounds that soldiers going to war gave their wives a conditional bill of divorce. The Talmud also reads the changing terms for the visitor ("traveller", "wayfaring man", "man") as the progress of the evil inclination, first a passerby, then a guest, then master of the house, and Rashi adopts this reading in his commentary on the verse. David's own sentence of fourfold repayment is taken as a prophecy of his punishment, fulfilled in the deaths of Bathsheba's first child, Amnon and Absalom, and the rape of Tamar.

== In culture ==
Edgar Allan Poe's 1844 short story "Thou Art the Man", a parody of detective fiction, takes its title from Nathan's words. The confrontation between Nathan and David has been a recurring subject in Western art, including an illustration in James Tissot's Hebrew Bible series.

In Hebrew literature, Moshe Shamir's 1957 novel Kivsat ha-Rash, a retelling of the story from Uriah's point of view, was published in English as The Hittite Must Die.

== See also ==
- David and Bathsheba
- Parables of Jesus
- Mashal
