= Basya =

Basya may refer to:

- Basya River, Belarus, the place of the 1660 Battle of Basya
- Basya (given name)
- Basya, a nickname of the protagonist of the 2015 Indian film Bullet Basya
