= Betsabé (given name) =

Betsabé or Bethsabée or Betsabe or Betsabeé are feminine given names, all forms of the name Bathsheba.

== Women ==
- Betsabé Espinal (1896–1932), Colombian labor rights activist
- Betsabeé Romero (born 1963), Mexican visual artist
- Bethsabée de Rothschild (1914–1999), philanthropist, dance patron, and member of the Rothschild banking family
