= Mashal =

Mashal can refer to:

- Mashal (allegory), biblical parable or allegory
- Mashal Alam, village in Gilan Province, Iran
- Communist Party of Nepal (Mashal)
- FC Mash'al, Uzbek football club
- Mashal University, private university in Kabul, Afghanistan

== People ==
=== Given name ===
- Mashal Khan (disambiguation), several people
- Mashal Sultanpuri (pen name of Mohammed Ramzan Bhat; 1937–2020), Kashmiri poet and writer
- Mashal Yousafzai, Pakistani government official
- Mashal Zaben (born 1950), Jordanian military commander

=== Surname ===
- David Marshall (né Mashal; 1908–1995), Singaporean politician and lawyer
- Ismail Mashal (born 1986), Afghan educator
- Khaled Mashal (born 1956), Palestinian political leader
- Lutfullah Mashal (born 1971), Afghan politician

== See also ==
- Mashaal, 1984 Bollywood film
