= Batia Grossbard =

Polish-Israeli painter (1910–1995)

- בתיה גרוסברד
- Born: April 14, 1910; Ostrow, Poland
- Died: August 11, 1995 (85); Haifa, Israel
- Education: Warsaw Academy of Fine Arts
- Occupation: Artist
- Style: Abstract Expressionism
- Spouse: Yehoshua Grossbard (Vielke Broda)
- Children: Mira Baron
- Parent(s): Eliyahu Gershon Freidkes Simchoni and Golda Rajza Freidkes
- Awards: Herman Struck Prize, Haifa Municipality (1971); Herman Struck Prize, Haifa Municipality (1997)

Batia Friedkes Grossbard (Hebrew: בתיה גרוסברד; April 14, 1910 – August 11, 1995) was a Polish-born Israeli painter influenced by American abstract expressionism.

== Biography ==
Grossbard attended and graduated from the Warsaw Academy of Fine Arts in Poland. She worked with watercolor and oil paints, as well as producing lithographs.

In 1938, she immigrated to Palestine. After resettling there, she served with the British Army and later settled in Haifa and married the painter Yehoshua Grossbard.

In 1954, she studied at the atelier of André Lhote in Paris. She was a member of the Ein Hod artists' colony in Haifa and of the Artists and Sculptors Association in Israel.

In 1966, "Lines and Trees," a collection of her work, was published. Her work includes mountainscapes of the post-Six Day War period through the 1970s. Her later work was much more abstract.

== Awards ==
- Herman Struck Prize, Haifa Municipality (1971)
- Herman Struck Prize, Haifa Municipality (1997)

== Exhibitions ==
- Artists in Israel for the Defense at the Tel Aviv Museum of Art, Helena Rubinstein Pavilion in Tel Aviv (July 25, 1967 - August 8, 1967)
- General Exhibition, Art in Israel 1967 at the Tel Aviv Museum in Tel Aviv (September 17, 1967 - October 12, 1967)
- Art Festival, Painting & Sculpture in Israel 1969 at Ganei Hataarucha in Tel Aviv (September 3, 1969 - September 25, 1969)
- Painting and Sculpture Week at the Painters and Sculptors Association in Israel at Haifa and the North (September 27, 1969 - October 4, 1969)
- Drawings and Paintings at the Artists' House in Jerusalem (January 6, 1973 - January 24, 1973)
- Group Exhibition at the Haifa City Museum in Haifa (July 10, 1976 - July 31, 1976)
- Five Years to "Alon" at the Allon Museum in Jerusalem (1983)
- Paintings - Batia Grossbard at the Debel Gallery in Ein Kerem, Jerusalem (June 2, 1984 - June 21, 1984)
- Haifa - Portrait of a City at the Museum of Art in Haifa (1988)
- Modern Drawing - New Approaches at the Haifa Museum of Modern Art (January 30, 1988 - March 12, 1988)
- Group Exhibition at the Yad Labanim Museum in Petach-Tikva (October 12, 1991 - November 16, 1991)
- Batia Grossbard - Solo Exhibition at the Municipal Art Gallery, Smilansky Cultural Center in Rehovot (May 28, 1994 - July 2, 1994)
- Solo Exhibition at the Gallery of Art, University of Haifa in Haifa (1996)
- Artists Messengers of Peace at the Artists' House in Jerusalem (1996)
- Batia Grossbard, The Large Paintings 1979-89 at the University of Haifa, Faculty of Humanities, Gallery of Art in Haifa (December 21, 1996 - February 13, 1997)
- Exhibition of Struck Prizewinners at the Painters and Sculptors Association in Israel at Haifa and the North (March 15, 1997 - April 1, 1997)
- Women Artists in Israeli Art - The 80's at Alternative Exhibition places in Haifa (1998)
- Vision of Light: A Century of Watercolor in Israel at the Israel Museum in Jerusalem (December 1, 1998 - February 28, 1999)
- Batia Grossbard - Works on paper at the Ein-Hod Artists' Gallery, Janco Dada Museum in Ein Hod (October 23, 1999 - November 10, 1999)
- Meeting in the Atelier: Kupferman and his Teachers at The Kupferman Collection House in Kibbutz Lochamei Hagetaot (2006)
- Salt of the Earth - Israeli Portraits at the Wilfrid Israel Museum, Oriental Art and Studies in Kibbutz Hazorea (June 7, 2008 - September 7, 2008)
- Group Exhibition at Zaritsky Artists House in Tel Aviv (July 5, 2018 - July 28, 2018)
