= Bathsheba, Oklahoma =

Ghost Town in Oklahoma, United States

Bathsheba (Hebrew: בת שבע, Bat Sheva, "daughter of the oath") or Bethsheba is a ghost town that was located in Oklahoma, United States. While its exact location is unknown, it was located between Enid, Oklahoma and Perry, Oklahoma. The town was created to be a utopia for women and no men were allowed. Even male animals were barred from the colony. The town is also the subject of a realistic fiction book by Barbara DeVault entitled A Gentle Breed: The Story of Bathsheba, A Town Without Men.

== Demographics ==
Its population consisted of 33 females, 12 of whom left the town after one week. The town's government consisted of a mayor, a police chief and a city council. The police chief's primary function was to guard the community from possible male visitors. It existed for a period of about 12 weeks before its residents vacated.

== History ==
In 1961, Oklahoma historian Robert Cunningham retold the story of an unnamed Kansas reporter who visited the settlement and was shot at by the female police chief while exploring the settlement from afar. A crowd of other colonists had gathered, and fled to their tents after the incident. The reporter later returned to the settlement at the request of his editor to find only prairie.

The existence of Bethsheba is disputed by scholars. In researching for his book Ghost Towns of Oklahoma, Dr. John W. Morris was "unable to specifically locate" the town.

== The Daisy Colonists ==
Female boomer, Annette Daisy, gathered thirty-four women to establish a homestead "across the sacred borders of which no man shall pass." The Daisy Colonists settled on 480 acres (1.9 km^{2}), a few miles west of Ponca. This settlement had two houses and four shelters by December 1893. While the story is similar, neither the town name of Bethsheba nor Annette Daisy appear in Garfield County records.

== See also ==
- List of ghost towns in Oklahoma
