= Kevin Larsson =

Finnish footballer (born 2001)

Personal information
- Date of birth: 15 September 2001 (age 25)
- Position: Forward

Team information
- Current team: Kentucky Wildcats
- Number: 11

College career
| Years | Team | Apps | (Gls) |
| 2022–2024 | James Madison Dukes | 56 | (11) |
| 2025– | Kentucky Wildcats | 19 | (2) |

Senior career*
| Years | Team | Apps | (Gls) |
| 2018 | KäPa | 16 | (2) |
| 2019–2021 | HIFK | 18 | (0) |
| 2021 | Oulu | 8 | (0) |
| 2021 | OLS | 8 | (2) |
| 2022 | KäPa | 4 | (1) |
| 2023 | KäPa | 9 | (0) |
- * Club domestic league appearances and goals as of 17:36, 26 January 2024 (UTC)

Kevin Larsson (born 15 September 2001) is a Finnish professional footballer who plays as a forward for Kentucky Wildcats in Sun Belt Conference (SBC).
