= Basia, Attock =

Basia
- Village
- Location within Pakistan
- Coordinates: 33°53′N 72°23′E
- Country: Pakistan
- Province: Punjab
- District: Attock
- Tehsil: Hazro
- Region: Chhachh
- Time zone: UTC+5 (PST)

Basia is a small village in Chach Valley of Attock District in Punjab Province of Pakistan. It is located between Peshawar and Islamabad, not far from Attock City.
