= Batsheva (given name) =

Batsheva is a feminine given name of Hebrew origin meaning “daughter of the oath” or “daughter of seven.” It is often given in reference to the Biblical character Bathsheba.

== Women ==
- Batsheva Hay (born 1980 or 1981), American fashion designer
- Batsheva Kanievsky (1932–2011), Israeli Rebbetzin
- Batsheva Katznelson (1897–1988), Israeli politician
- Batsheva Kerem (born 1955), Israeli geneticist
- Bat-Sheva Zeisler, Israeli vocalist, actress, and voice teacher
