= Haifa City Museum =

Israeli museum

Coordinates: 32°49′20″N 34°59′32″E

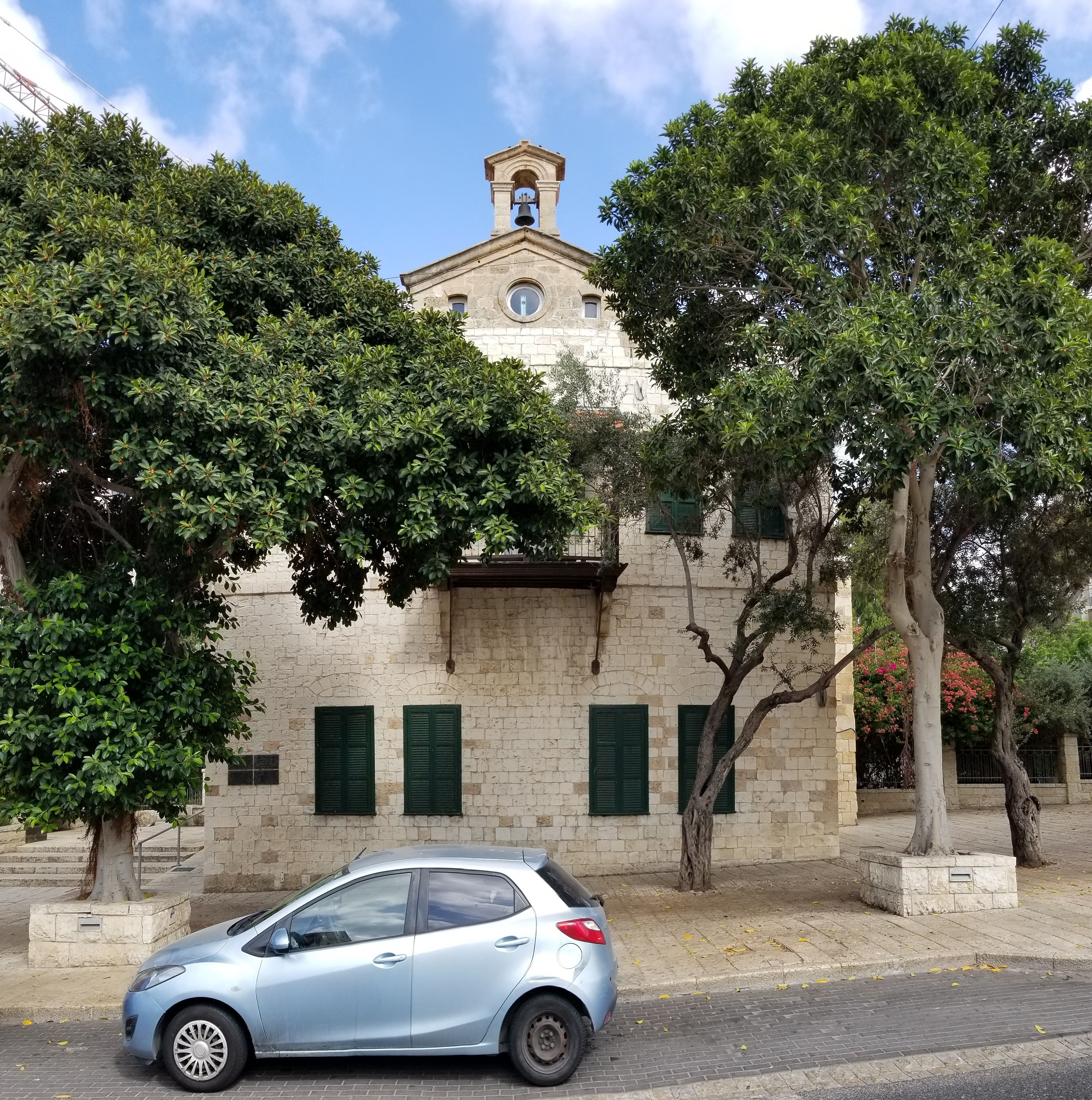
Haifa City Museum, Beit Haam

The Haifa City Museum was inaugurated in November 2000 as the historical City Museum. Its location, at the edge of Haifa's German Colony and near the historical part of the city, affords a view of a rich and complex urban fabric that reveals the historical diversity of the city's different populations. As part of the museum's cultural activities, it mounts exhibitions on themes related to the city's physical and spiritual core. Historically, Haifa has been a hub of different cultures and a meeting point between East and West. Set at its heart and attentive to its different aspects, the museum opens a space for socio-political debates that emerge in the urban environment.

== Beit Ha’am and the Templars School ==
The Haifa city museum resides in the German Colony at a compound that includes two buildings from the Templers' period. “Beit Ha’am”, the first Templar building to be built in Palestine that was once the community center of the historic German Colony, Haifa.

The building which was built in 1896, was renovated in 1890. The adjacent school building was erected in 1902. Both buildings now house the City Museum.

== Exhibits ==
Since its inception in 2000, the Haifa City Museum has mounted large-scale temporary exhibitions that fill the museum's entire indoor space and address a variety of major issues related to Haifa and to Israeli society in general. The museum's changing exhibits shed light on the pivotal processes and themes that have molded the image of Haifa both as a modern city as a reflection of the culture of Israel's society. These unique exhibits engage in the singular dynamic of the city between different populations, physical spaces and social institutions that create the urban texture. The exhibits reflect the historical developments that have effected the development of the city from the Ottoman era to today. They examine the relations between the place and the community and how it could have affected the constitution of a local, national, religious or ethnic identity as well as the transferral of ideals and ideologies. The museum has permanent exhibitions and temporary exhibitions. The museum has previously exhibited photographs of the city since the turn of the century alongside contemporary photographs, exhibitions on Haifa port, the Hijaz railway, Christians in Israel and Haifa, intersecting histories, Ottoman Haifa, Haifa during the British Mandate, "On the Way to the Sea", "The City and I", "Urban Landscape", "1948", "A Black Flag in a Red City" Wadi Salib: 1948–2019.
