= Ayoub Ezzaytouni =

French footballer (born 2001)

Personal information
- Date of birth: 12 September 2001 (age 25)
- Place of birth: Nîmes, France
- Height: 1.73 m (5 ft 8 in)
- Position: Midfielder

Team information
- Current team: Bourgoin-Jallieu

Senior career*
Years	Team	Apps	(Gls)
2019–2022	Châteauroux B	27	(3)
2019–2022	Châteauroux	6	(0)
2022–2023	Stade Bordelais	20	(0)
2023–2024	Châtellerault	19	(0)
2024–	Bourgoin-Jallieu	0	(0)
- * Club domestic league appearances and goals as of 19:52, 11 June 2024 (UTC)

Ayoub Ezzaytouni (born 12 September 2001) is a French professional footballer who plays as a midfielder for Championnat National 3 club Bourgoin-Jallieu.

== Career ==
Ezzaytouni made his professional debut with Châteauroux in a 3–0 Ligue 2 loss to Niort on 9 August 2019.

On 6 July 2022, Ezzaytouni signed with Stade Bordelais in Championnat National 2. On 10 June 2024, he signed for Championnat National 3 club Bourgoin-Jallieu.

== International career ==
Born in France, Ezzaytouni is of Moroccan descent. He was called up to represent the Morocco U20s at the 2021 Africa U-20 Cup of Nations.
