= Batia Holin =

Israeli photographer and social activist

- בתיה הולין
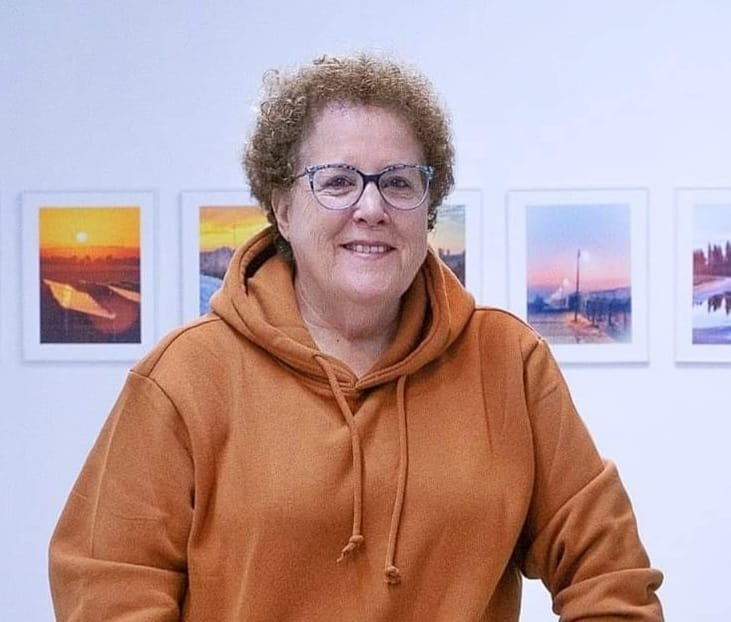
- Born: 22 January 1953 (age 72); Holon, Israel
- Occupations: Photographer; curator; teacher

Batia Holin (Hebrew: בתיה הולין; née Cahana; born 22 January 1953) is an Israeli photographer and social activist.

== Biography ==
Holin was born in 1953 in Holon to Levi Cahana, a member of the security services, and Sarah Cahana. In the army she served as a casualty officer in the reserve brigade of the paratroopers. After she was released from service in the IDF, she studied for a bachelor's degree in oceanography at Ben-Gurion University of the Negev, a master's degree in planning and another master's degree in administration and public policy. For the thesis she wrote, she was awarded the Sapir Prize for outstanding work.

During her studies, she taught geography at Ben Gurion University. In 1975 she moved to live in Kibbutz Kfar Aza. Two years later she married a kibbutz member.

== Social activity and the promotion of settlement in the Negev and the Galilee ==
Holin began teaching at the elementary school in Kibbutz Sa'ad and later moved to teach at the school in Kibbutz Yad Mordechai. After that, she managed the Atidim project in the southern region. In 2010 she worked for the Or movement, where she managed the demographic growth division. Holin was involved in the establishment of about ten new settlements in the Negev and the Galilee.

Holin was a member of the movement for the Western Negev and engaged in promoting and lobbying for the change in the security situation in the Western Negev. As part of her role, she was invited in 2018 by the UN Human Rights Committee in Geneva, where she gave testimony about the events on the border fence between Gaza and Israel and warned many about the security situation in the area and the vulnerability of the settlements in the border.

== "Walking the Paths" ==
Since 2010 Holin has been documenting and photographing the paths of Kibbutz Kfar Aza and the area surrounding Gaza. In the widely publicized documentary project "Walking the Paths", Holin photographs and documents her experiences during the day in the kibbutz and in the area. She showcased her work at various venues, including the gallery in Kibbutz Nahal Oz, the "Mekarer" gallery in Tel Aviv and the Sha'ar HaNegev. In February 2023, she presented an exhibition called "Between Us" in collaboration with an amateur photographer from Gaza, Mahmoud, a pseudonym employed to preserve his anonymity. The exhibition included photographs from both sides of the border fence: Holin documented the Israeli side and 'Mahmoud' the other side. The exhibition received coverage in the national and international media. On October 7, 2023, during the massacre at the kibbutz, Holin received a call from 'Mahmoud', who was trying to extract information about the movement of the army in Kfar Aza. Holin immediately realized that the one she thought was her partner, in the creation and aspiration for coexistence between the two peoples, betrayed her and collaborated with the terrorists.

In December 2023, together with Moshe Ash, she curated the exhibition "Will someone answer our messages already". The exhibition shows photographs of WhatsApp correspondence of the members of the kibbutz during the massacre in the kibbutz. The correspondence is accompanied by photos and photographs of well-known artists there, including Yossi Lemel, Ze'ev Engelmeir and Eldad Ziv. In the same month, an exhibition of her photographs "In our paths and for us" was presented at the Water Tower Gallery in Kibbutz Shefayim.
