= Bathsheba (Gérôme) =

Painting by Jean-Léon Gérôme

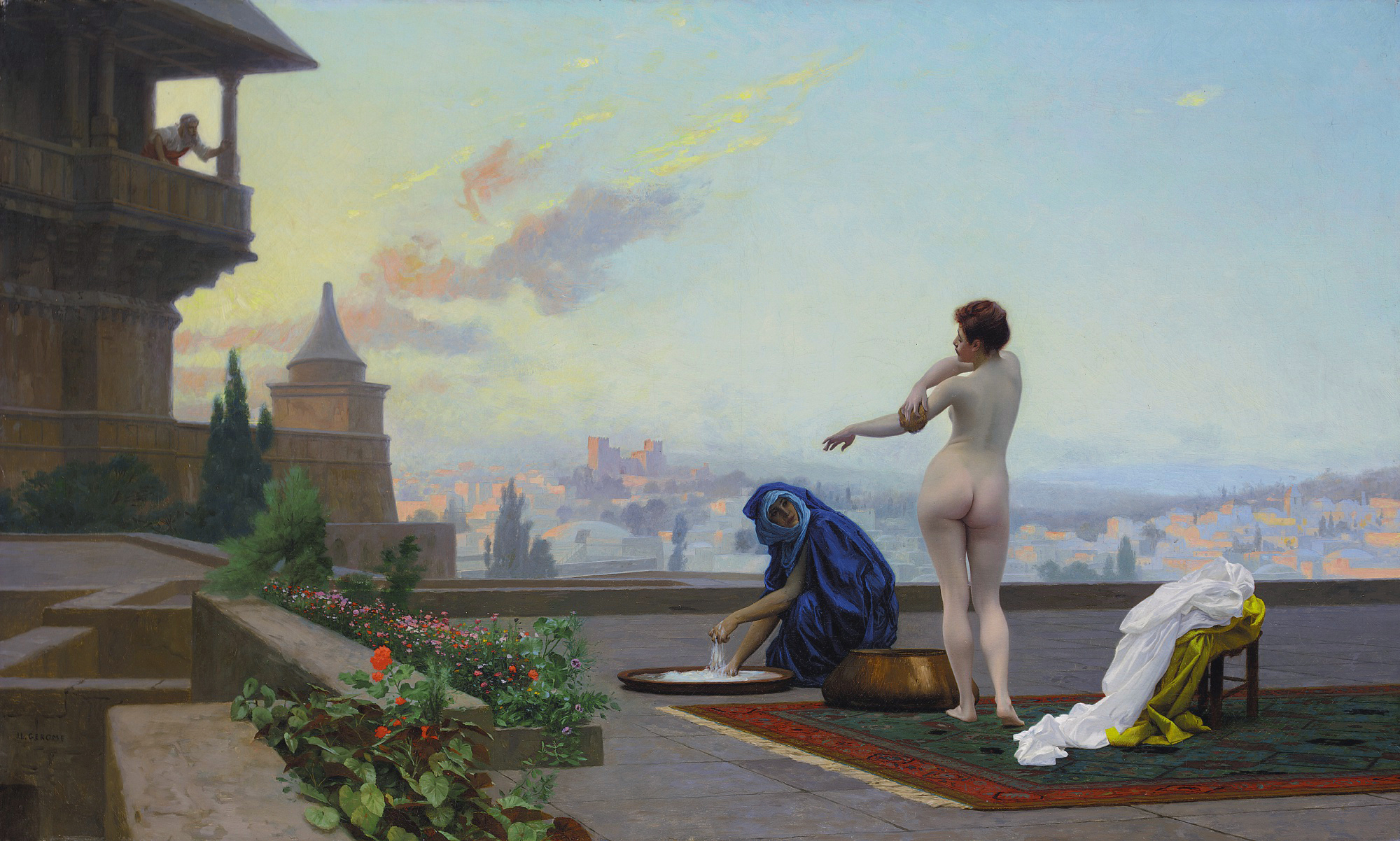
- Artist: Jean-Léon Gérôme
- Year: 1889
- Medium: Oil on canvas
- Dimensions: 60.5 cm × 100 cm (23.8 in × 39 in)
- Location: Private collection

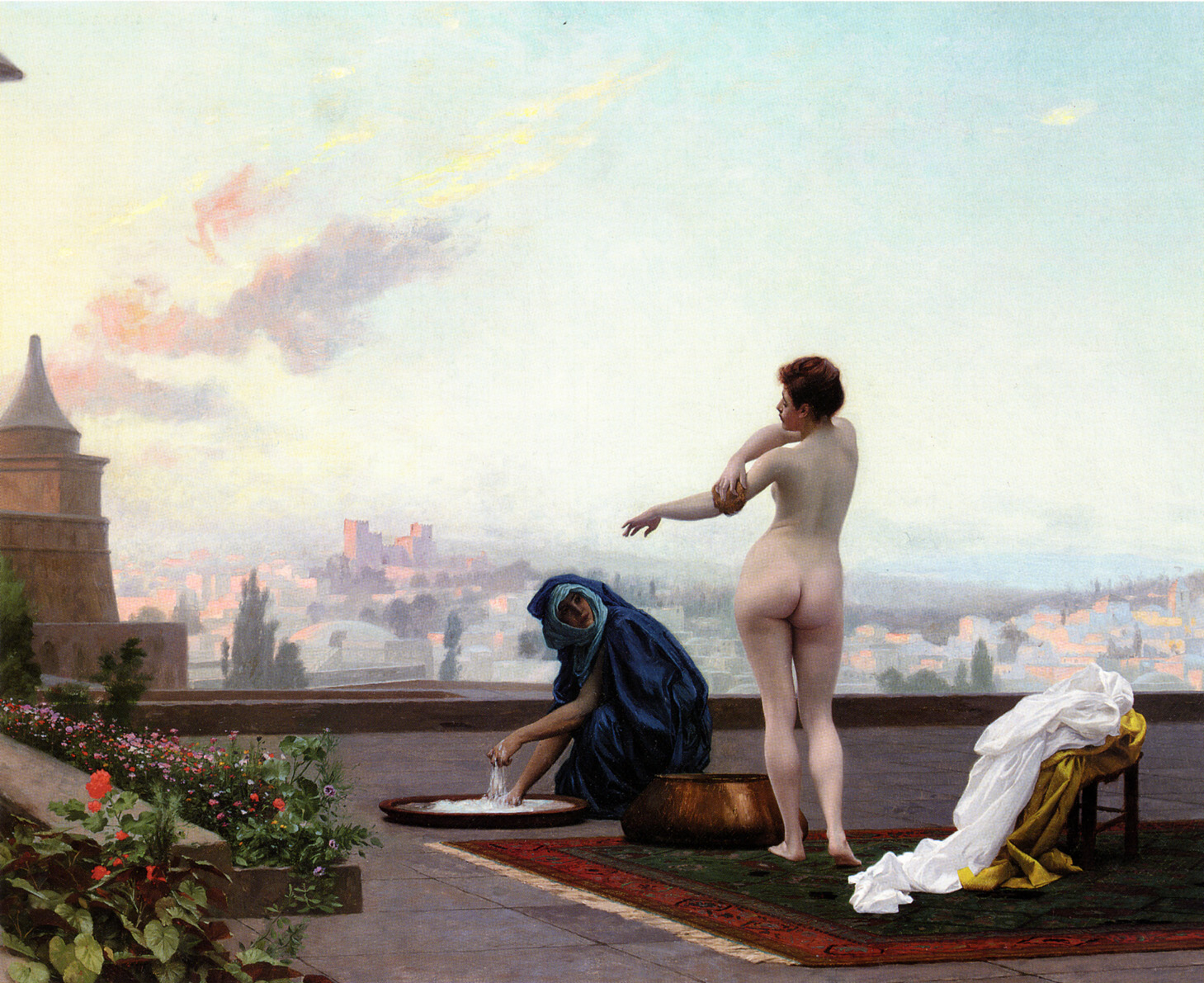
Bathsheba and her maidservant (detail)

Bathsheba (French: Bethsabée) is an oil painting on canvas by the French painter Jean-Léon Gérôme, made at Bougival in 1889. The work is now kept in a private collection.

== History ==
And it came to pass in an eveningtide, that David arose from off his bed, and walked upon the roof of the king's house: and from the roof he saw a woman washing herself; and the woman was very beautiful to look upon.

— 2 Samuel 11:2 KJV

Gérôme worked much at Bougival, on the roof of his summer atelier, which was arranged so that the trees and shrubbery inclosed and sheltered it from curious eyes, enabling him to pose his model in the open air and obtain different atmospheric effects. A picture painted there in the summer of 1889 is called Bathsheba, and represents the beautiful wife of Uriah the Hittite, bathing on the terrace-roof of her house.

== Analysis ==
According to Fanny Field Hering, "This figure is a marvel of plastic grace and delicate flesh-tints, and the effects of light are equally amazing."

== See also ==
- 2 Samuel 11
- Academic art
- Orientalism

== Sources ==
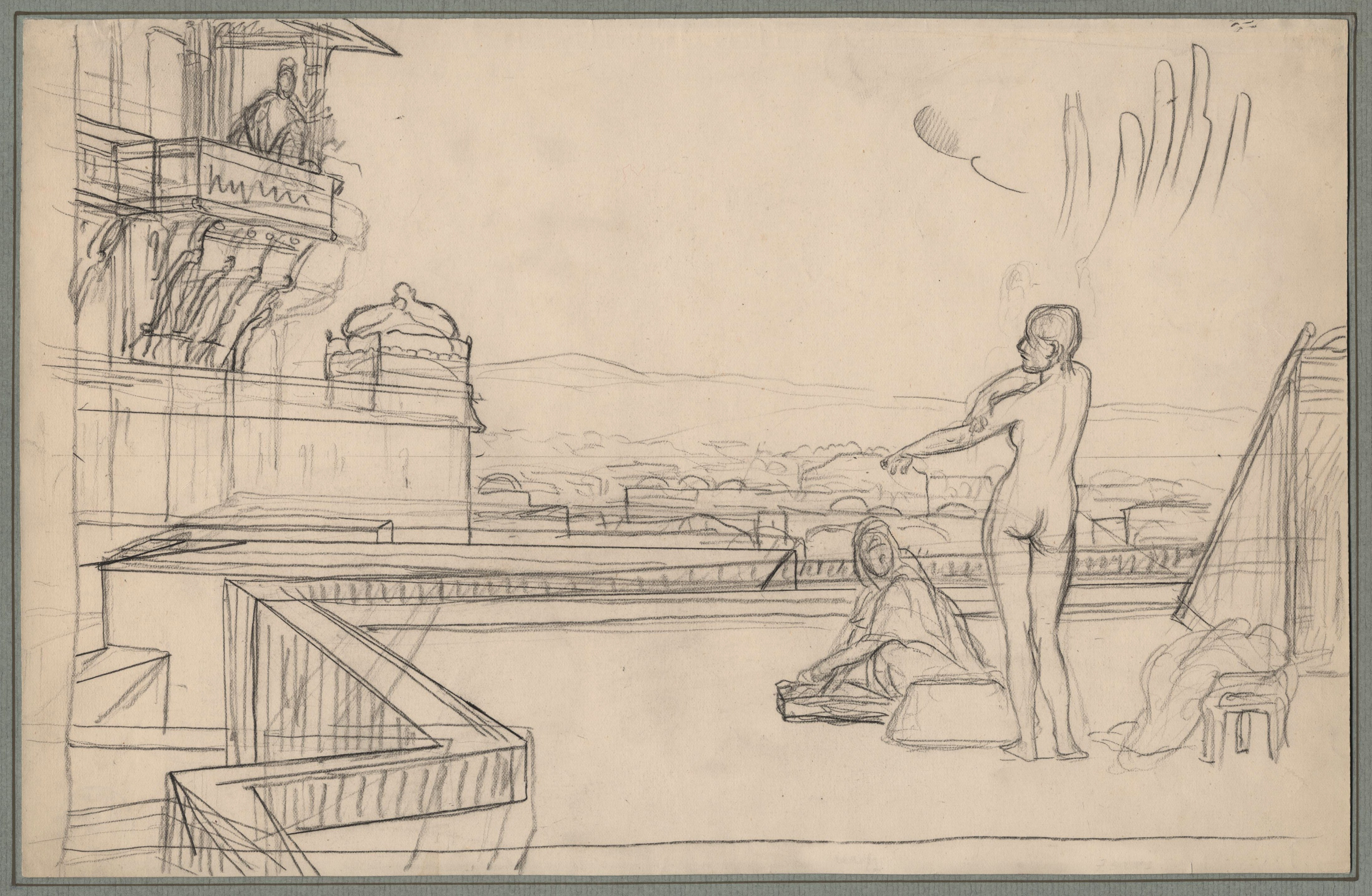
Study in black pencil, 232 x 359 mm (9.1 x 14.1 in), in a private collection

- Ackerman, Gerald M. (1997). Jean-Léon Gérôme: His Life, His Work, 1824–1904. Courbevoie, Paris: ACR Édition Internationale, PocheCouleur. pp. 132–133.
- Blanchard, Kathryn D.; Webster, Jane S., eds. (2012). Lady Parts: Biblical Women and The Vagina Monologues. Eugene, OR: Wipf & Stock. p. 21.
- Junker, Yohana A. (2021). "Unsettling the Gaze: Bathsheba beyond Verse and Image". In Hornik, Heidi J.; Boxall, Ian; Dykema, Bobbi (eds.). The Art of Biblical Interpretation: Visual Portrayals of Scriptural Narratives. Atlanta, GA: Society of Biblical Literature. p. 20.
- Hering, Fanny Field (1892). Gérôme: The Life and Works of Jean Léon Gérôme. New York, NY: Cassell Publishing Company. p. 274.
- Huber, Lynn R.; Clanton Jr., Dan W.; Webster, Jane S. (2007). "Biblical Subjects in Art". In Roncace, Mark; Gray, Patrick (eds.). Teaching the Bible Through Popular Culture and the Arts. Atlanta, GA: Society of Biblical Literature. pp. 197–198.
- "(#17) Jean-Léon Gérôme". Sotheby's. 2017. Retrieved 27 May 2022.
- "Jean-Léon Gérôme, Bathsheba, ca. 1895". Dahesh Museum of Art. 2002. Retrieved 27 May 2022.
