= Mashal Khan =

Mashal Khan may refer to:

- Mashal Khan (actress) (born 1997), Pakistani TV actress and model
- Lynching of Mashal Khan, Pashtun and Muslim student killed in 2017
