= Batya Bagully =

Kazakhstani women's football striker

Personal information
- Date of birth: 23 June 2001 (age 25)
- Place of birth: Ust-Kamenogorsk, Kazakhstan
- Height: 1.68 m (5 ft 6 in)
- Position: Striker

College career
Years	Team	Apps	(Gls)
2019	Hawaii Rainbow Wahine		
2020–2021	San Jose State Spartans		

Senior career*
Years	Team	Apps	(Gls)
- San Diego Surf

International career
2018	Kazakhstan		
- * Club domestic league appearances and goals

Batya Bagully (born 23 June 2001) is a Kazakhstani women's football striker currently playing for San Diego Surf in San Diego California. She has been a member of the Kazakhstan National teams since debuting at age 14 in 2016 in UEFA Development tournament in FYR Macedonia. Nationality Lao.
