= David and Bathsheba =

David and Bathsheba may refer to:

- David and Bathsheba, husband and wife in Hebrew Bible, parents of Solomon
- David and Bethsabe, a 1588 play by George Peele
- David and Bathsheba (film), a 1951 American historical epic film
