= Francesco Hayez =

Italian painter (1791–1882)

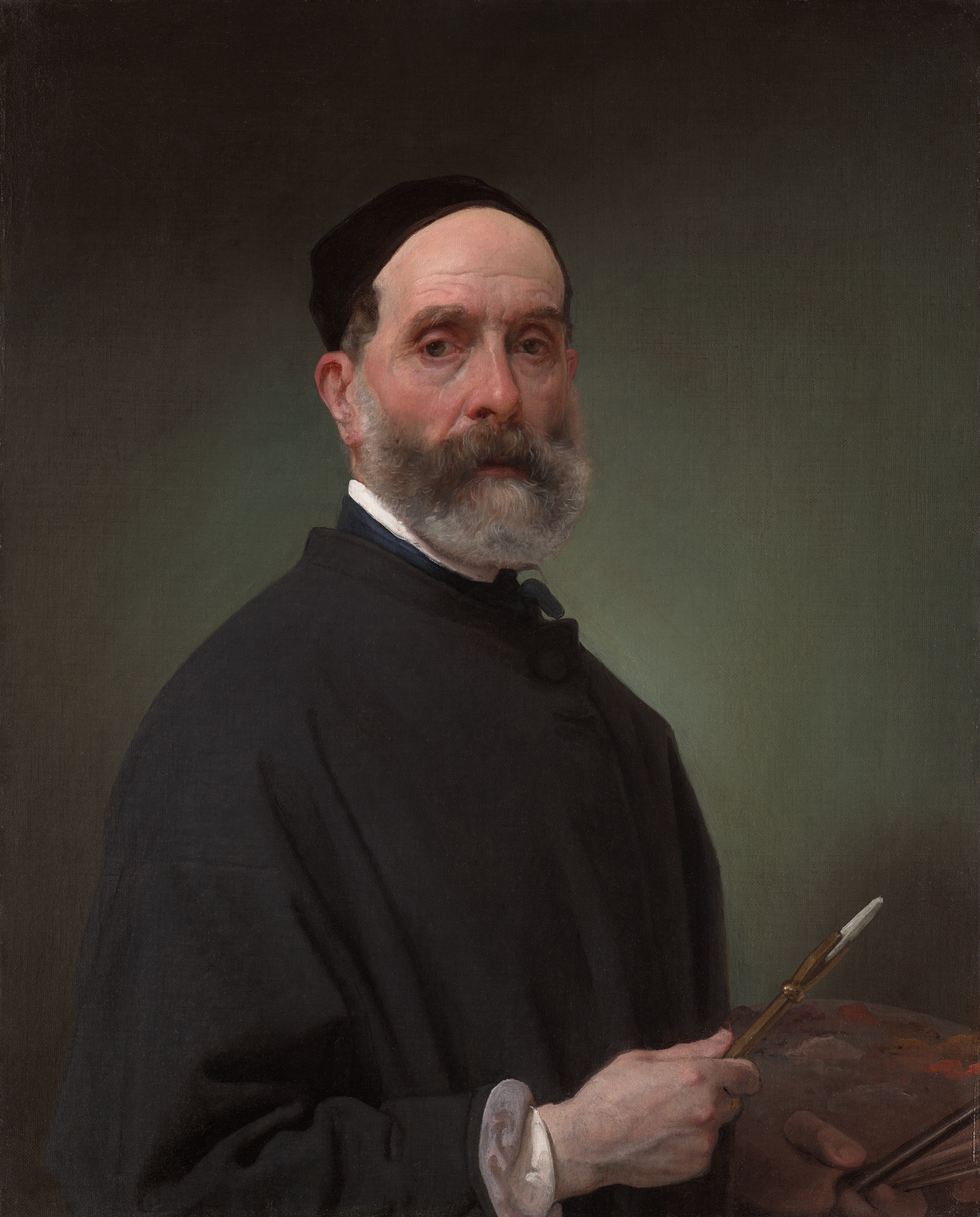
- Self-Portrait at the age of 78 in 1869
- Born: 10 February 1791; Venice, Republic of Venice
- Died: 12 February 1882 (aged 91); Milan, Kingdom of Italy
- Known for: Painting
- Notable work: The Kiss
- Movement: Romanticism

Francesco Hayez (Italian: [franˈtʃesko ˈaːjets]; 10 February 1791 – 12 February 1882) was an Italian painter. He is considered one of the leading artists of Romanticism in mid-19th-century Milan, and is known for his grand historical paintings, political allegories, and portraits, in an Italian version of 19th-century Academic style.

== Biography ==
=== Training and early work ===
Francesco Hayez was from a relatively poor family from Venice. His father, Giovanni, was a fisherman of French origin while his mother, Chiara Torcella, was from Murano. Francesco was the youngest of five sons. Hayez displayed a predisposition for drawing since childhood. He was placed at a very early age in the Venetian studio of his uncle, the antiquarian Giovanni Binasco, who hoped to train him as a restorer of paintings.

In 1798, he started to study painting under Francesco Maggiotto and gained his first experience of the Neoclassical style. His artistic education was completed, in the years 1800–1803, by visits to the Galleria Farsetti, Venice, where he studied the plaster casts of antique sculptures and the reproductions of paintings by Giovanni da Udine from the Vatican. In 1803 he attended life drawing classes at the old Accademia di Pittura e Scultura in the Fonteghetto della Farina, and between 1802 and 1806 he studied the use of colour in classes run by the painter from Bergamo, Lattanzio Querena, a skilful portraitist and a copyist of 16th-century Venetian paintings.

In 1807, Hayez produced a Portrait of the Artist’s Family (Treviso, Museo Luigi Bailo). In 1808 he was finally able to enter the Accademia di Belle Arti di Venezia, recently modernized in its teaching methods by Leopoldo Cicognara, who was to remain an important adviser and patron for Hayez. He then attended the painting school run by the Neoclassicist Teodoro Matteini.

In 1809, Hayez won a scholarship to study at the Accademia di San Luca in Rome and left Venice in October, travelling south via Rovigo, Bologna, Florence (where he met the painters Pietro Benvenuti, Giuseppe Bezzuoli and Francesco Nenci) and Siena. At Rome, as well as studying the Antique, he spent a great deal of time studying the works of Raphael in the Vatican Stanze and visiting the workshop of the sculptor Antonio Canova, who was to have an enormous influence on him. Hayez was also able to meet many Italian and foreign artists in Rome, for example Tommaso Minardi, Jean-Auguste-Dominique Ingres and the Lukasbrüder, a group that would always hold a particular fascination for him.

In 1811, he entered a competition set by the Accademia of Naples, to which he travelled in the company of his friend the sculptor Rinaldo Rinaldi. Despite his failure to be accepted for the competition, he remained in Naples in order to study its antiquities and to complete drawings of its Renaissance monuments for Leopoldo Cicognara's Storia della scultura (3 vols, Venice, 1813–1818).

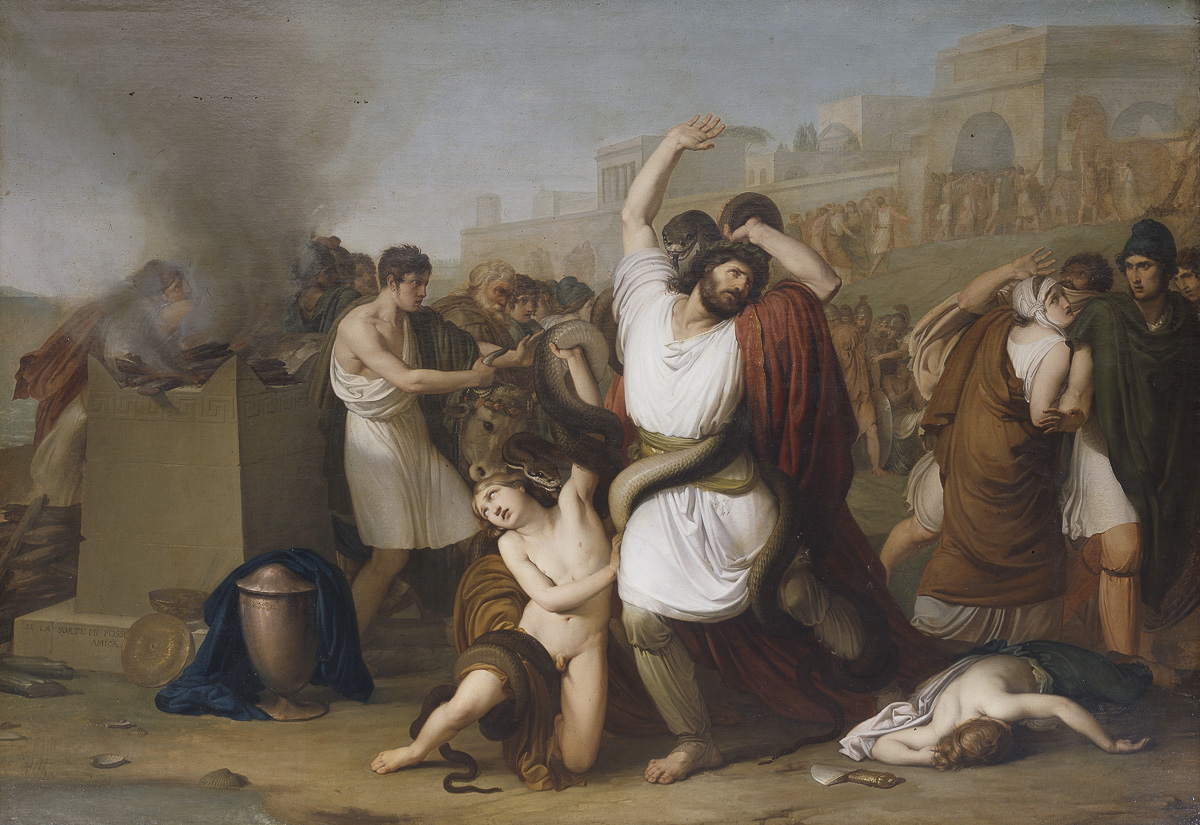
Laokoon, 1812, Milan, Pinacoteca di Brera

Returning to Rome in 1812, he sent his painting Laokoon (Milan, Pinacoteca di Brera) to the competition run by the Brera Academy, where he tied for the first prize with Antonio De Antoni (fl. 1812). Unwilling to keep to his undertaking to enter a second time, Hayez worked, instead, on an exceptional picture, Rinaldo and Armida (Venice, Ca' Pesaro), which he sent to Venice: it was the greatest work of his Neoclassical period. Because of this erratic behaviour, however, Canova sent Hayez away from Rome. He returned in 1815, after spending time at the court of Joachim Murat in Naples, where he began his large historical picture Odysseus at the Court of Alcinous (1814–1816; Naples, Museo di Capodimonte).

After his return, he won first prize in the competition established by Canova at the Accademia di San Luca, with his Triumphant Athlete (Rome, Accademia Nazionale di San Luca), beating the entries of such other artists as Ingres. Having provided excellent proof of his skills as a fresco artist while assisting Pelagio Palagi in the decoration of the Palazzo Torlonia in Rome in 1813, he was commissioned by Canova in 1816 to paint a number of fresco lunettes in the Chiaramonti corridor in the new wing of the Vatican Museums. Hayez disappointed Canova, however, because of his constant changes of mind and slowness in completing only three lunettes celebrating the artistic policies of Pope Pius VII: Sculpture Restored to Honour, the Return to Rome of her Stolen Works of Art and the Founding of the School of Drawing; and Hayez was accordingly relieved of his commission.

In 1817, Hayez was able to devote himself to works better suited to his abilities, such as the portrait of the Cicognara Family (Venice, priv. col.), which brought him back to Venice. Here, and in Padua, until 1821, he was involved in providing decoration for various palazzi: these included in Venice the Doge's Palace and the Palazzo Gritti, and in Padua the Palazzo Zabarella.

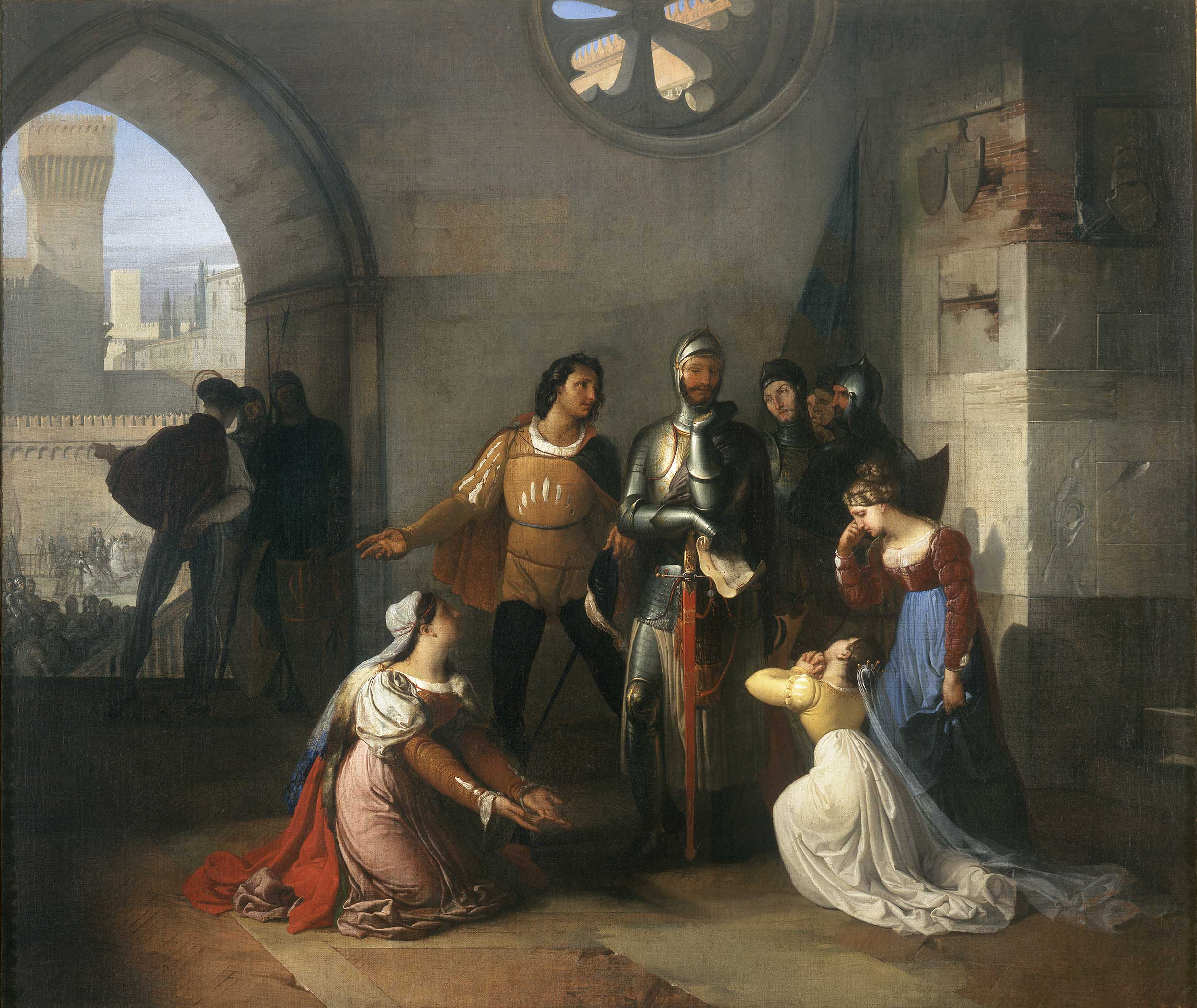
Pietro Rossi, 1818–1820, Milan, priv. col.

Between 1818 and 1819, while engaged on a commission to restore the paintings by Tintoretto in the Doge's Palace, he was encouraged by Canova and Cicognara to study 15th-century Venetian masters such as Giovanni Bellini and Vittore Carpaccio. This new interest was soon reflected in Hayez’s own work in the painting Pietro Rossi (Milan, priv. col.), produced between 1818 and 1820. Having failed to find a buyer in Venice, Hayez sent the picture in 1820 to the Brera exhibition in Milan, where it was received with great acclaim and acquired by Giorgio Pallavicino Trivulzio. Because of its new style and its subject, taken from medieval history, the work soon came to be seen as a manifesto for the new Romantic painting, and Hayez thus won immediate fame in Milanese artistic and literary circles. Here he met the writer Alessandro Manzoni and from the latter’s historical tragedy, Il conte di Carmagnola, he derived inspiration for a picture of this name. When shown at the Brera in 1821, it was admired by Stendhal, who declared Hayez to be the greatest Italian painter of the day.

=== Mature work: Milan, 1823–1848 ===
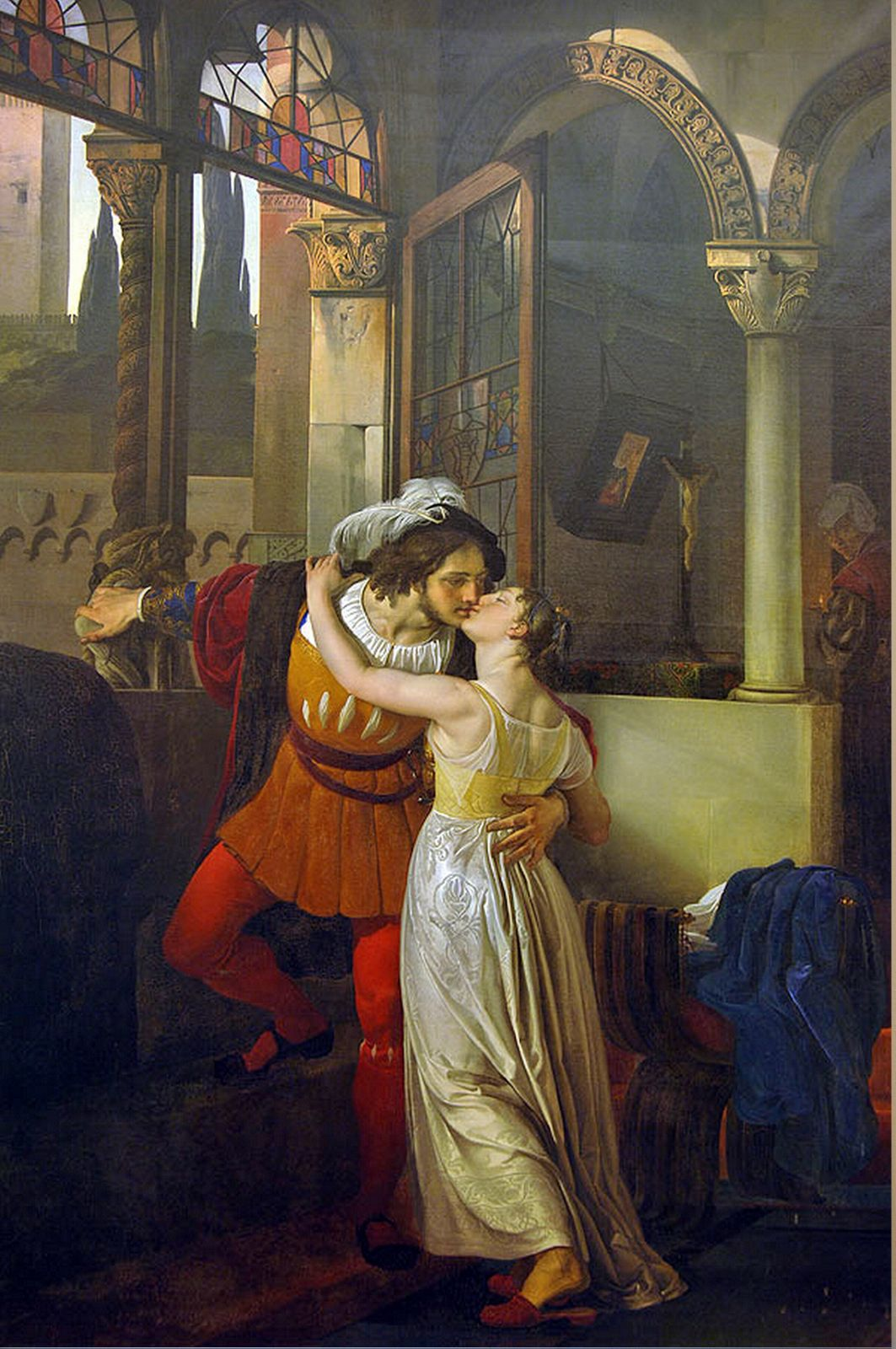
The Last Kiss of Romeo and Juliet, 1823, Tremezzo, Villa Carlotta

After being appointed as a temporary replacement for Luigi Sabatelli as Professor of Painting at the Brera Academy, Hayez moved to Milan in 1823 and embarked on a highly successful career as a history painter and portraitist, showing his works almost every year at the annual exhibitions at the Brera. His work was invariably highly praised by the Romantics and disparaged by the Classicists. This was especially the case with such masterpieces of his early years in Milan as the splendid The Last Kiss of Romeo and Juliet (1823; Tremezzo, Villa Carlotta) and the Penitent Magdalene (1825; Cernobbio, priv. col.). He also painted some extremely fine portraits during this period, for example those of Carlo Della Bianca (1822; Milan, Pinacoteca di Brera) and Carolina Zucchi (1825; Turin Civic Gallery of Modern and Contemporary Art), and a Self-portrait in a Group of Friends (1824–1827; Milan, priv. col.).

Among his most faithful patrons were men at the forefront of the fight for Italian independence, such as Francesco Teodoro Arese Lucini, who had himself painted in chains by Hayez in one of the most outstanding portraits of the 19th century (Milan, priv. col.). Exhibitions of Hayez’s history paintings, in which he often portrayed contemporary Milanese personalities in the guise of figures from the past, caused a great sensation, because of the novelty of their subject-matter and because of their style.

One of the most significant aspects of his art, however, was his interest in events from Italian history, which he portrayed in paintings containing clear political allusions, such as the Lampugnani's Conspiracy (1826–1829; Milan, Pinacoteca di Brera). The two paintings with perhaps the strongest political content were Peter the Hermit Preaching the First Crusade (Milan, priv. col.) and The Refugees of Parga (Brescia, Pinacoteca Tosio Martinengo), shown at the Brera Academy in 1829 and 1831 respectively. Because of the effectiveness of their patriotic message, the themes of the Crusades and the Greek War of Independence were repeated in other works. During this period Hayez also painted a number of individualistic and highly evocative portraits, such as the ones depicting the ballerina Carlotta Chabert as Venus Playing with Two Doves (Trent, Cassa di Risparmio) and the singer Giovanni David in Theatrical Costume (Milan, Pinacoteca di Brera), both of which caused a great stir at the Brera Exhibition of 1830. The following year he exhibited his beautiful Portrait of Cristina Trivulzio Belgiojoso (Florence, priv. col.), the princess who had been exiled by the Austrians. This sumptuous likeness was painted on panel, a technique used by Hayez for his most demanding portraits and for works in which he wanted to achieve particular effects of transparency and chromatic nuance.

Throughout this period Hayez alternated painting with printmaking, achieving brilliant results with lithography, a new means of reproduction only recently introduced to Milan. Of particular importance are the two sets of prints Lombards in the First Crusade, illustrating the historical poem (1827–8) by Tommaso Grossi, and a series (Milan, Biblioteca di Brera) illustrating Walter Scott’s novel Ivanhoe (1828–31). By the mid-1830s Hayez began to attend the Maffei Salon in Milan, hosted by Clara Maffei. Maffei's husband would later commission Hayez a portrait of his wife.

In 1833, when his fame was at its peak, he began work on a gigantic canvas intended to be his greatest work: Thirst Suffered by the First Crusaders beneath the Walls of Jerusalem, inspired by a variety of historical and literary sources. In 1838, having started work on the painting, he found a patron in the person of King Charles Albert of Sardinia, who was, however, never to see its completion when it was hung (1850) in the Hall of the Bodyguards in the Royal Palace of Turin. The painting, which still impresses today, partly through its echoes of Giuseppe Verdi’s melodramatic opera I Lombardi alla prima crociata, marked a change of direction for Hayez: from that point on he appeared more influenced by memories of the Venetian Settecento (especially the work of Piazzetta and Giovanni Battista Tiepolo) and also by aspects of contemporary German painting. A decisive factor in this change had been a trip to Munich to see recent German painting and to meet artists such as Peter Cornelius, Julius Schnorr von Carolsfeld, Heinrich Maria von Hess and Wilhelm von Kaulbach.

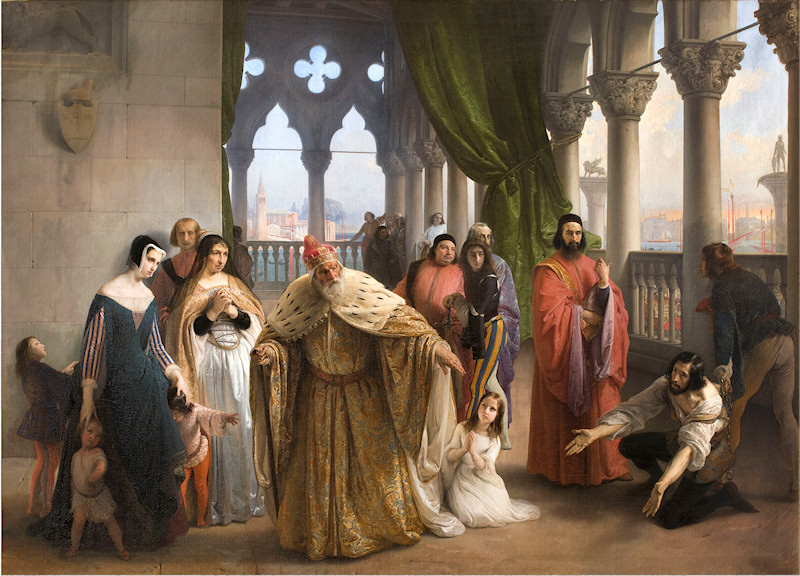
Two Foscari, 1838, Milan, priv. col.

In 1838 Ferdinand I of Austria, in Milan for his coronation, unveiled the fresco by Hayez in the Royal Palace, representing the Allegory of the Political Order of Ferdinand I of Austria (destr. 1943; cartoon, Milan, Pinacoteca di Brera), and admired two new paintings by Hayez at the Brera exhibition. Hayez received a commission from the Emperor, who also acquired the beautiful Two Foscari (Milan, priv. col.), a work that was to mark the start of a series of paintings of Venetian subjects that were to bring Hayez vast popularity. Recognition of the political commitment of his work, on the other hand, came from the politician Giuseppe Mazzini, who, in an article published in 1841, hailed Hayez as a great patriotic painter. In the meantime, Hayez’s painting became increasingly sophisticated and refined, both in composition and in technique. This applied not only to more intimate works such as his Self-portrait (1848; Milan, Pinacoteca di Brera) but also to his great historical pictures, such as his new version of The Sicilian Vespers (Rome, Galleria Nazionale d'Arte Moderna), which was commissioned by the Neapolitan Prince Ruffo di Sant’Antimo, and which was begun in Sicily in 1844 (completed 1846). One of the significant features of these works is the way in which they relate to the contemporary melodramas of Verdi, a friend of the artist, whom Hayez often advised in the staging of his operas.

=== Late work, after 1848 ===
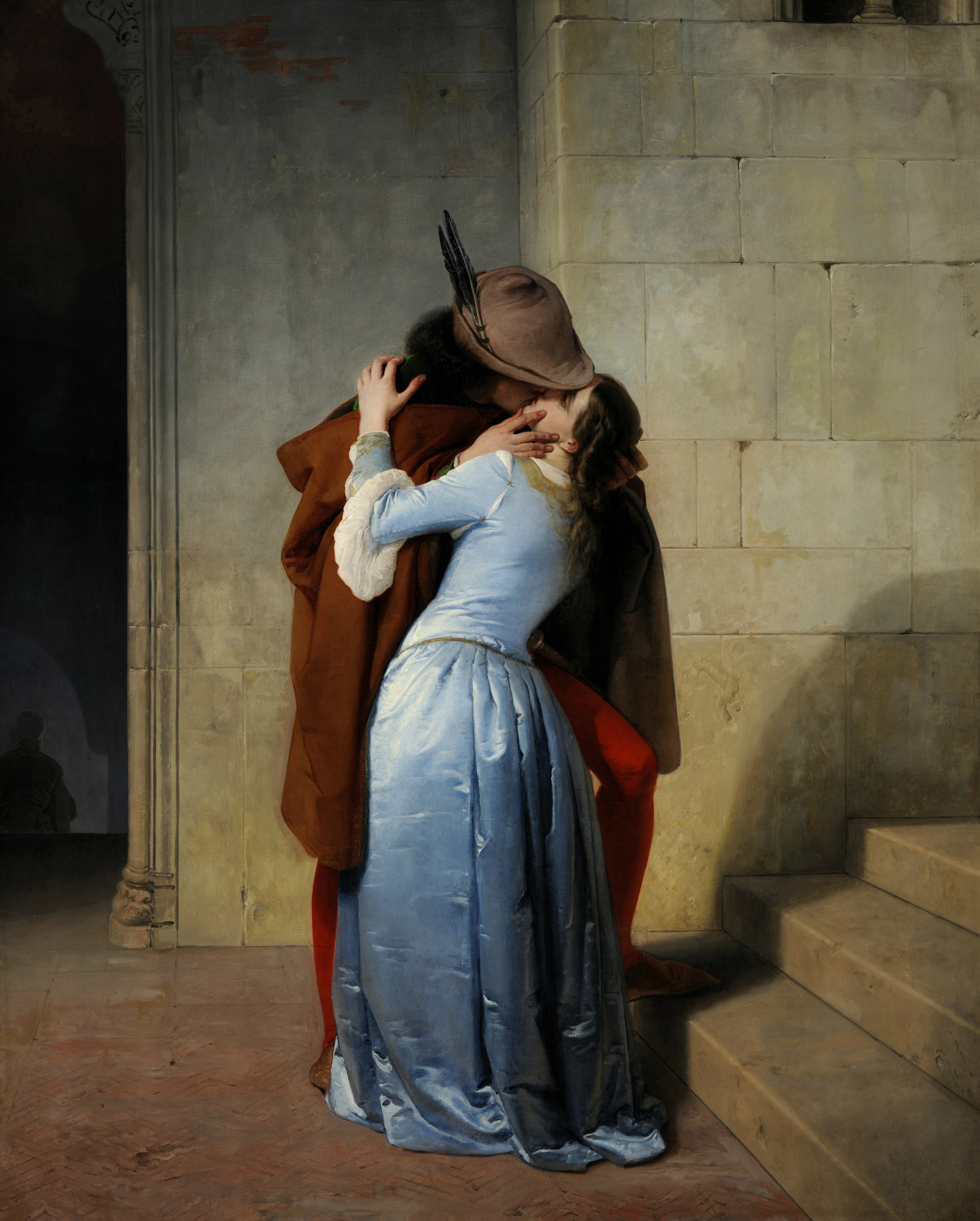
The Kiss, 1859, Milan, Pinacoteca di Brera

After the Five Days of Milan, in which Hayez took an active part, his painting underwent a radical change. He almost entirely abandoned great historical subjects and devoted himself to painting allegories with strong political connotations, such as two versions of Meditation (1850; Brescia, priv. col.). He found great popularity with the Revenge Triptych, comprising Secret Accusation (1848; Pavia, Pinacoteca Malaspina), Vengeance is Sworn (1851; Milan, priv. col.) and Revenge of a Rival (1853; Milan, priv. col.). This was also a period of exceptional portraits, revealing great psychological insight and extraordinary skills in formal arrangement, as in the Portrait of Matilde Juva Branca (1851; Milan, Galleria di Arte Moderna). Hayez had little success with works sent to the Exposition Universelle in Paris in 1855, but he was well received on his second trip to Munich in 1858. He greeted the unification of Italy with a small painting, The Kiss (Milan, Brera, exh. 1859), symbolic of the new historical climate and now his best-known work. The anonymous, unaffected gesture of the couple does not require knowledge of myth or literature to interpret, and appeals to a modern gaze. Despite his advancing years, he continued painting until the end of his life, devoting himself mainly to portraits, for example those of the author and statesman Massimo d’Azeglio (1864), of Camillo Benso, Count of Cavour (1864) and of the composer Gioachino Rossini (1870; all Milan, Pinacoteca di Brera).

His two most exacting late works were his large historical paintings, completed in 1867 and presented to the Academies of Milan and Venice: Marin Faliero Led to his Death (Milan, Brera) and Destruction of the Temple in Jerusalem (Venice, Ca’ Pesaro). The bleakly pessimistic message of these two canvases contrasts with the mood of his last work, shown at the Mostra Nazionale in Milan in 1881, a Vase of Flowers at the Window of the Harem (1881; Milan, Brera), a simple and joyful homage to the art of painting. In 1869 Hayez had begun dictating his memoirs, which provide the main source of information on his life. Hayez died in Milan, age 91. His studio at the Brera Academy is marked with a plaque. Among his pupils from the Brera Academy were Carlo Belgioioso, Amanzio Cattaneo, Alessandro Focosi, Giovanni Battista Lamperti, Livo Pecora, Angelo Pietrasanta, Antonio Silo, Ismaele Teglio Milla and Francesco Valaperta. After the great success it had enjoyed during his lifetime, his historical work was not appreciated by later critics, who much preferred his portraits, until the positive reassessment of his oeuvre as a whole during the 1970s.

== Critical assessment ==
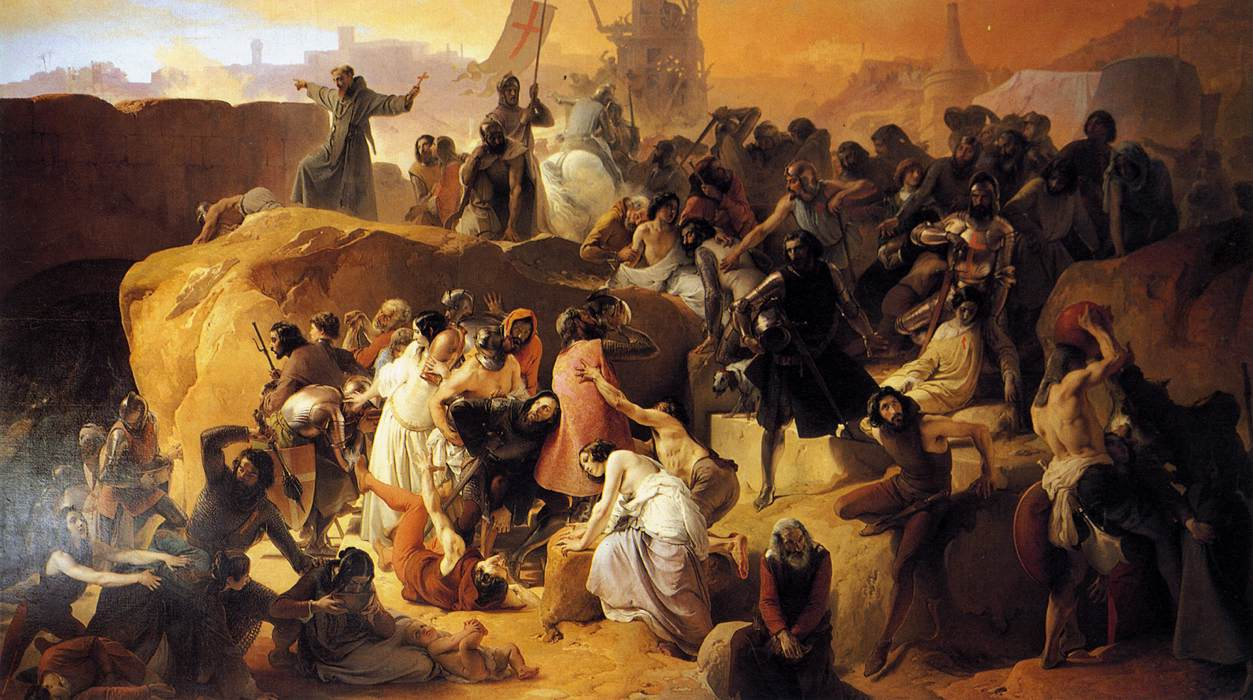
Crusaders Thirsting near Jerusalem (1836–1850)

Over the course of a long career, Hayez proved to be particularly prolific. His output included historic paintings designed to appeal to the patriotic sensibility of his patrons as well as works reflecting the desire to accompany a Neoclassic style to grand themes, either from biblical or classical literature. He also painted scenes from theatrical presentations. Conspicuously absent from his oeuvre, however, are altarpieces - possibly due to the Napoleonic invasions that deconsecrated many churches and convents in Northern Italy. Art historian Corrado Ricci described Hayez as a classicist who then evolved into a style of emotional tumult.

His portraits have the intensity of Ingres and the Nazarene movement. Often sitting, Hayez's subjects are often dressed in austere, black and white clothing, with little to no accoutrements. While Hayez made portraits for the nobility, he also explored other subjects like fellow artists and musicians. Late in his career, he is known to have worked using photographs.

One of Hayez's favorite themes was semi-clothed Odalisque evocative of oriental themes – a favorite topic of Romantic painters. The depictions of harems and their women allowed artists the ability to paint scenes otherwise not acceptable within society. Even Hayez's Mary Magdalene has more sensuality than religious fervor.

A scientific assessment of Hayez's career has been made complicated by his proclivity for not signing or dating his works. Often dates in his paintings indicate when the work was acquired or sold, not the time of its creation. Moreover, he often painted the same compositions several times with minimal variations if any at all.

== Gallery ==
See also Category:Paintings by Francesco Hayez.

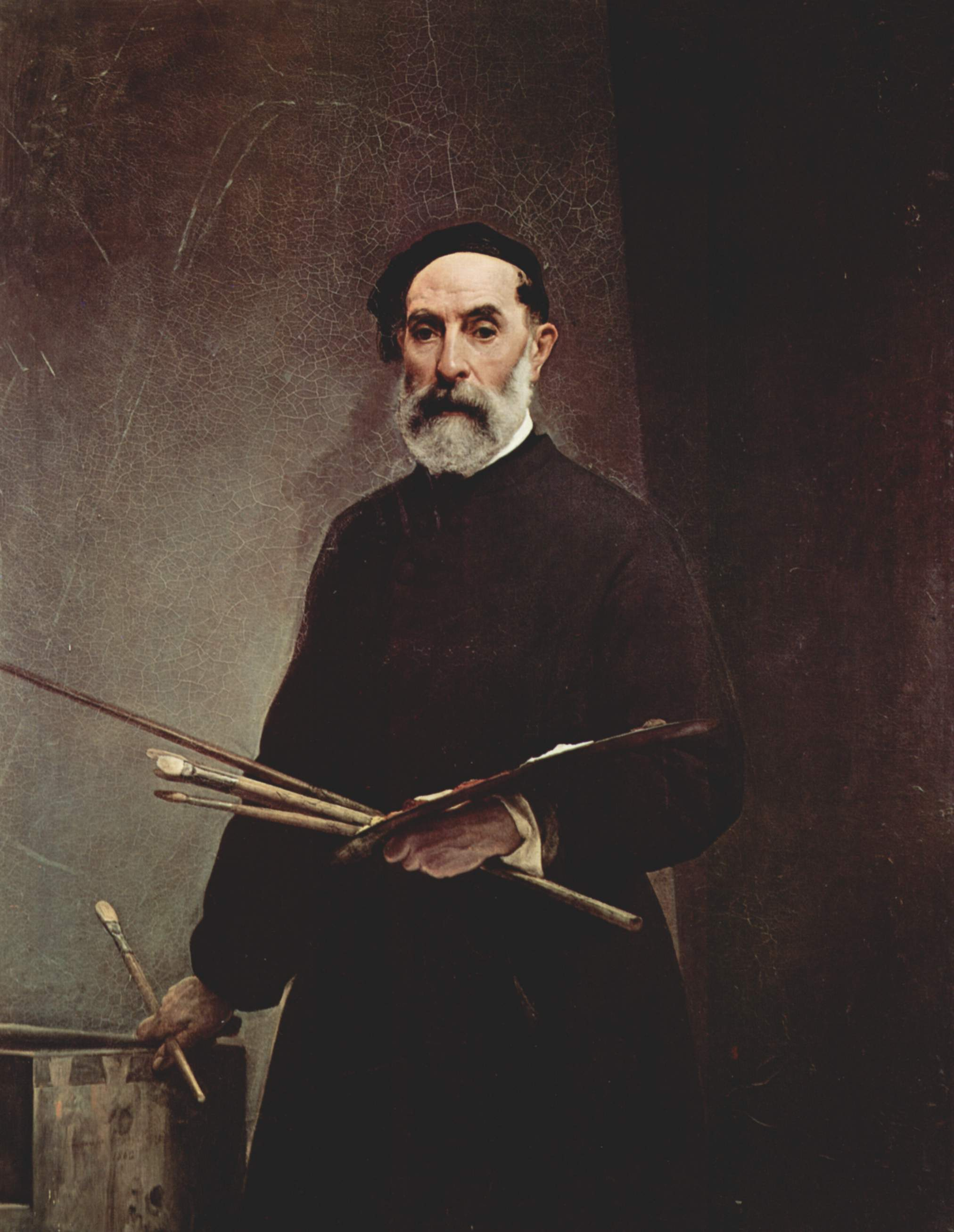
Self-Portrait, Galleria degli Uffizi, Florence

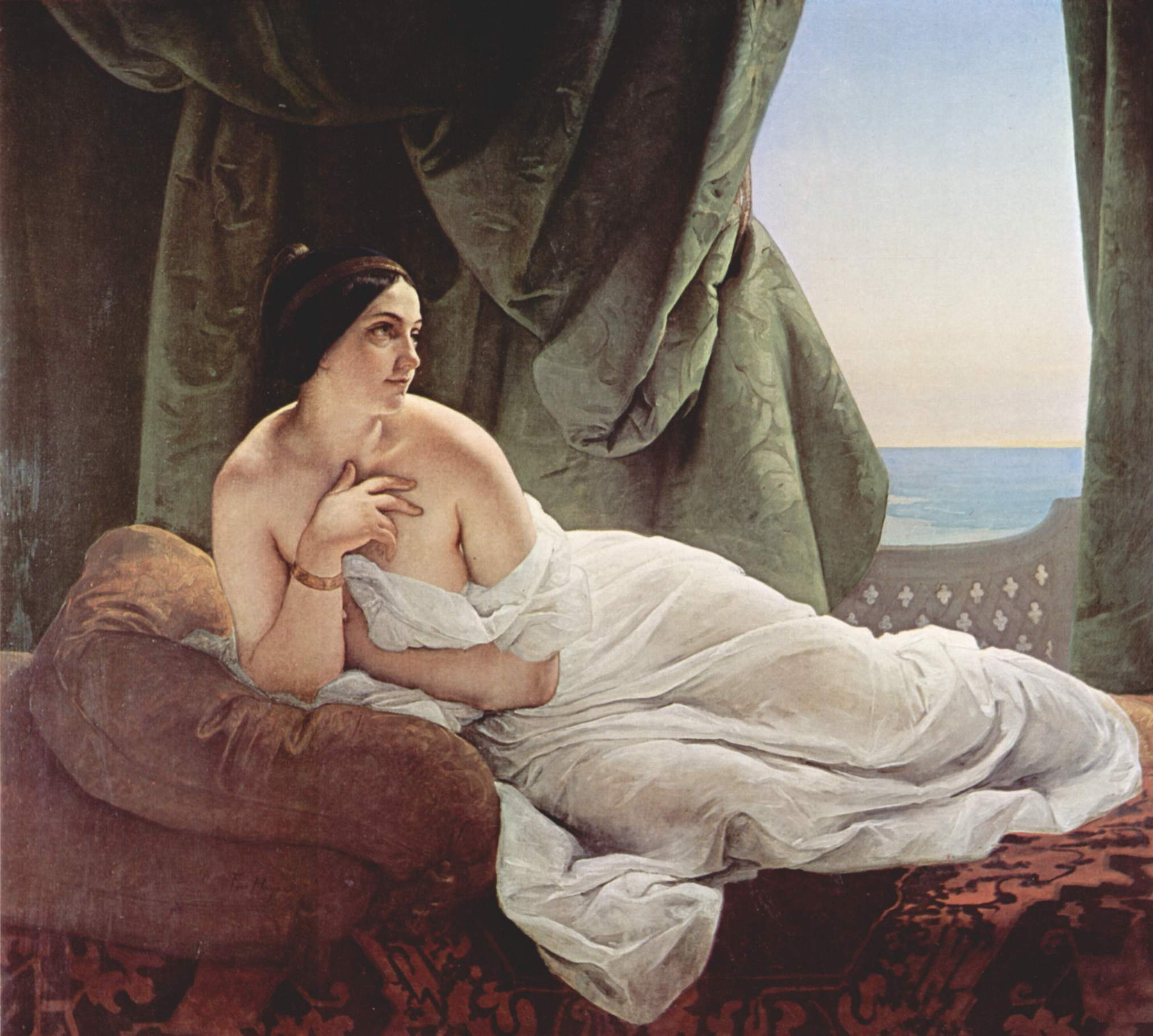
Reclining Odalisque (1839)

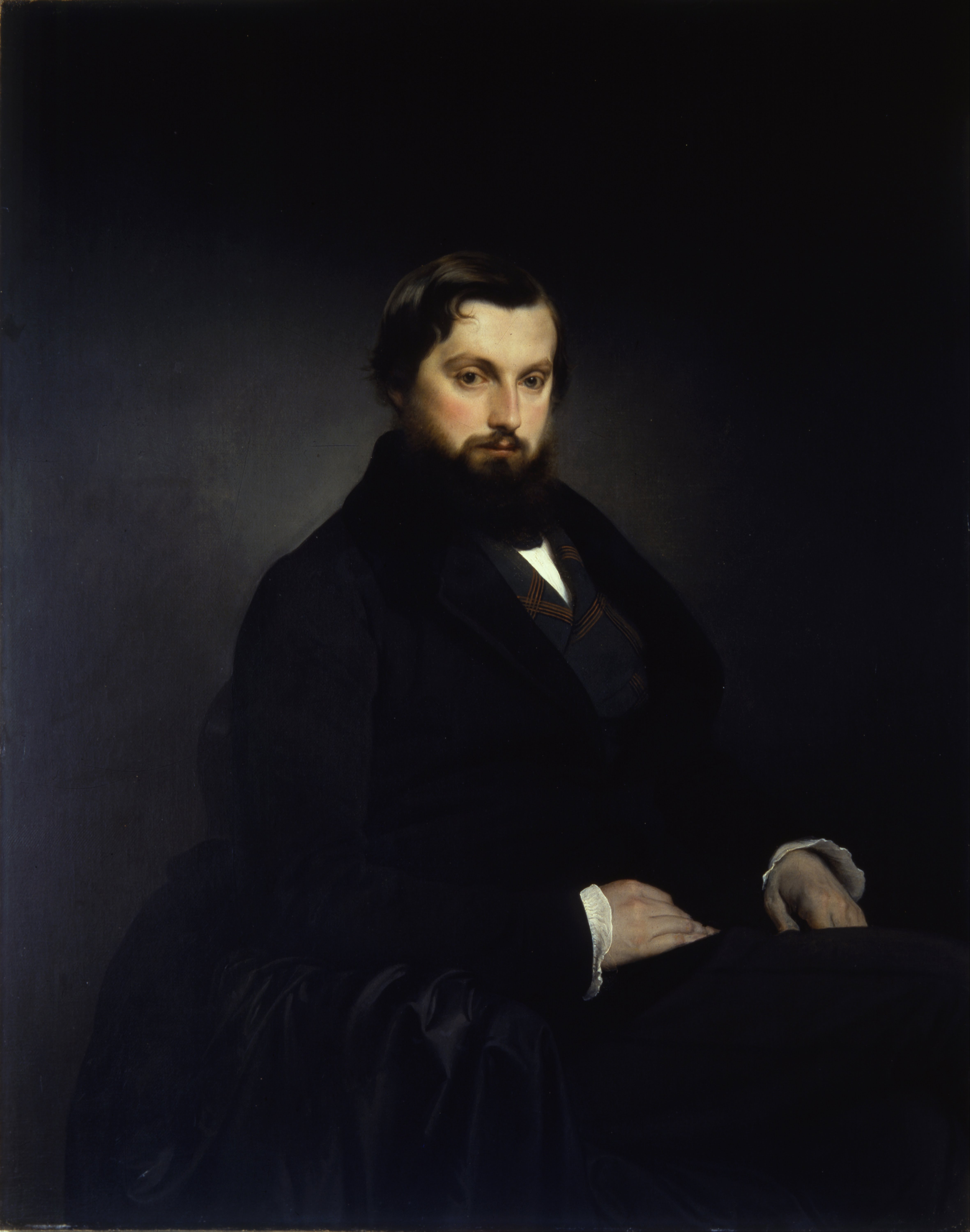
Portrait of Gian Giacomo Poldi Pezzoli

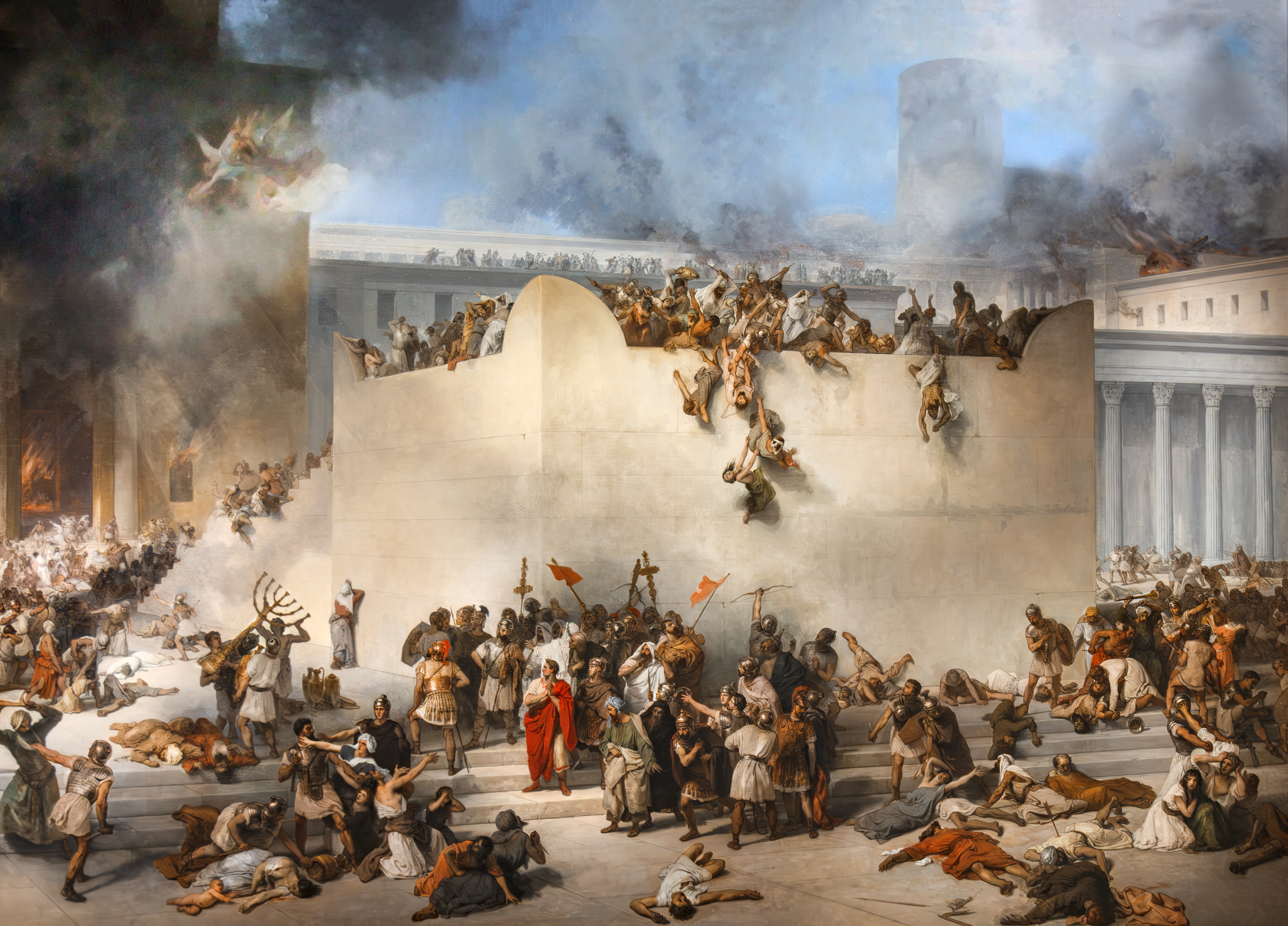
The Destruction of the Temple of Jerusalem (1867)

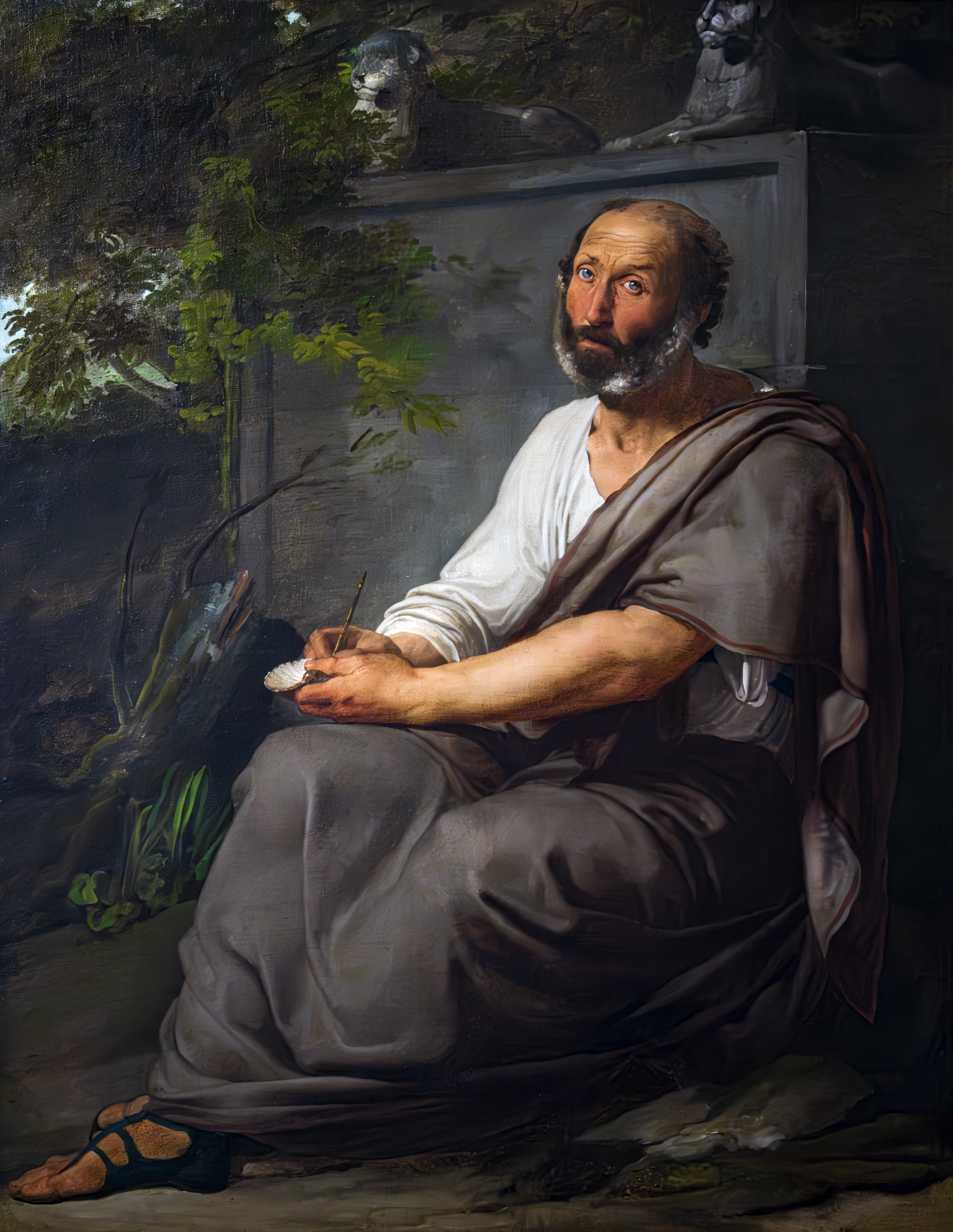
Aristotle, 1811

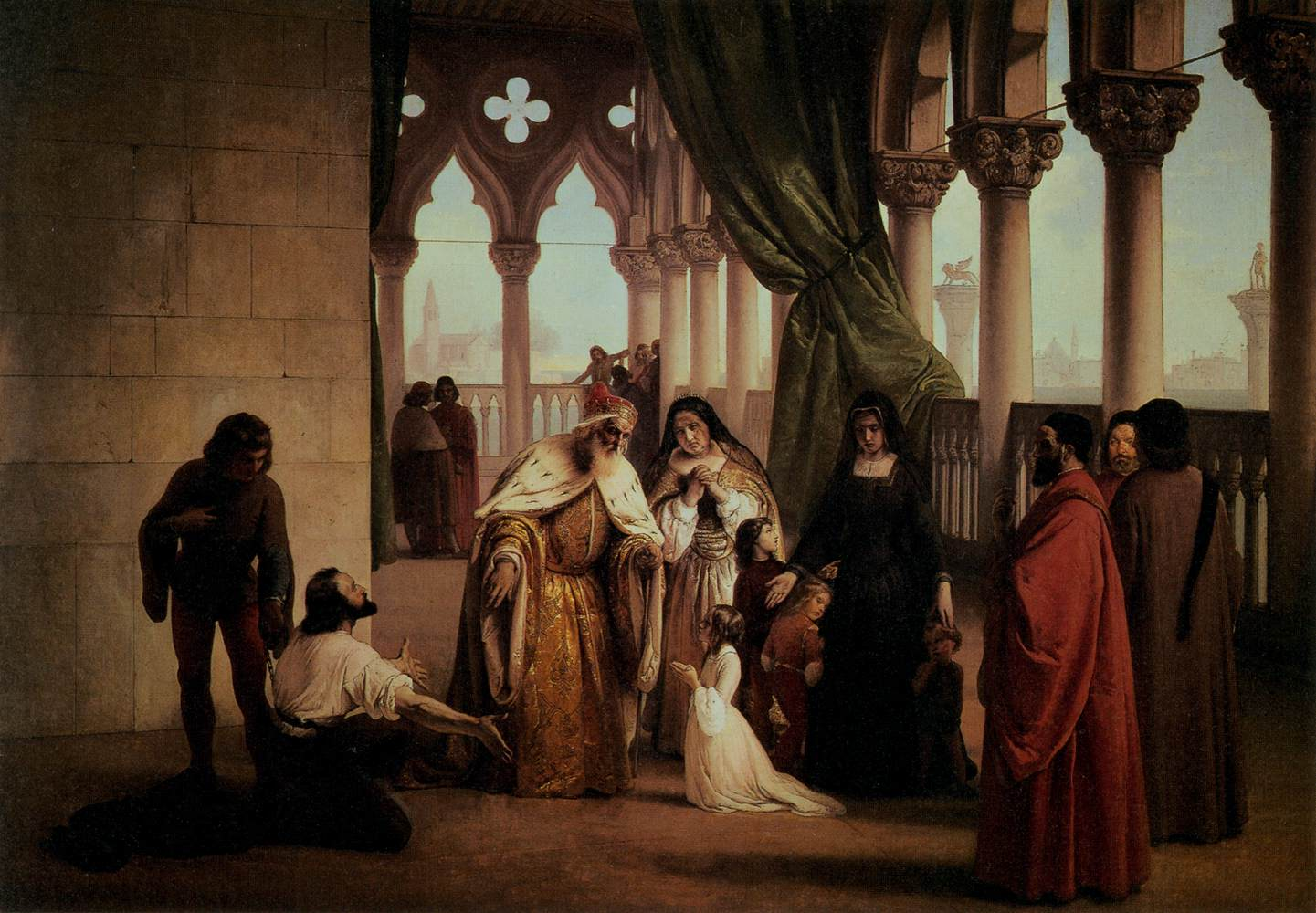
Scene from Byron's drama The Two Foscari (Antonio Bernocchi family collection, today in the Museum of Fondazione Cariplo)

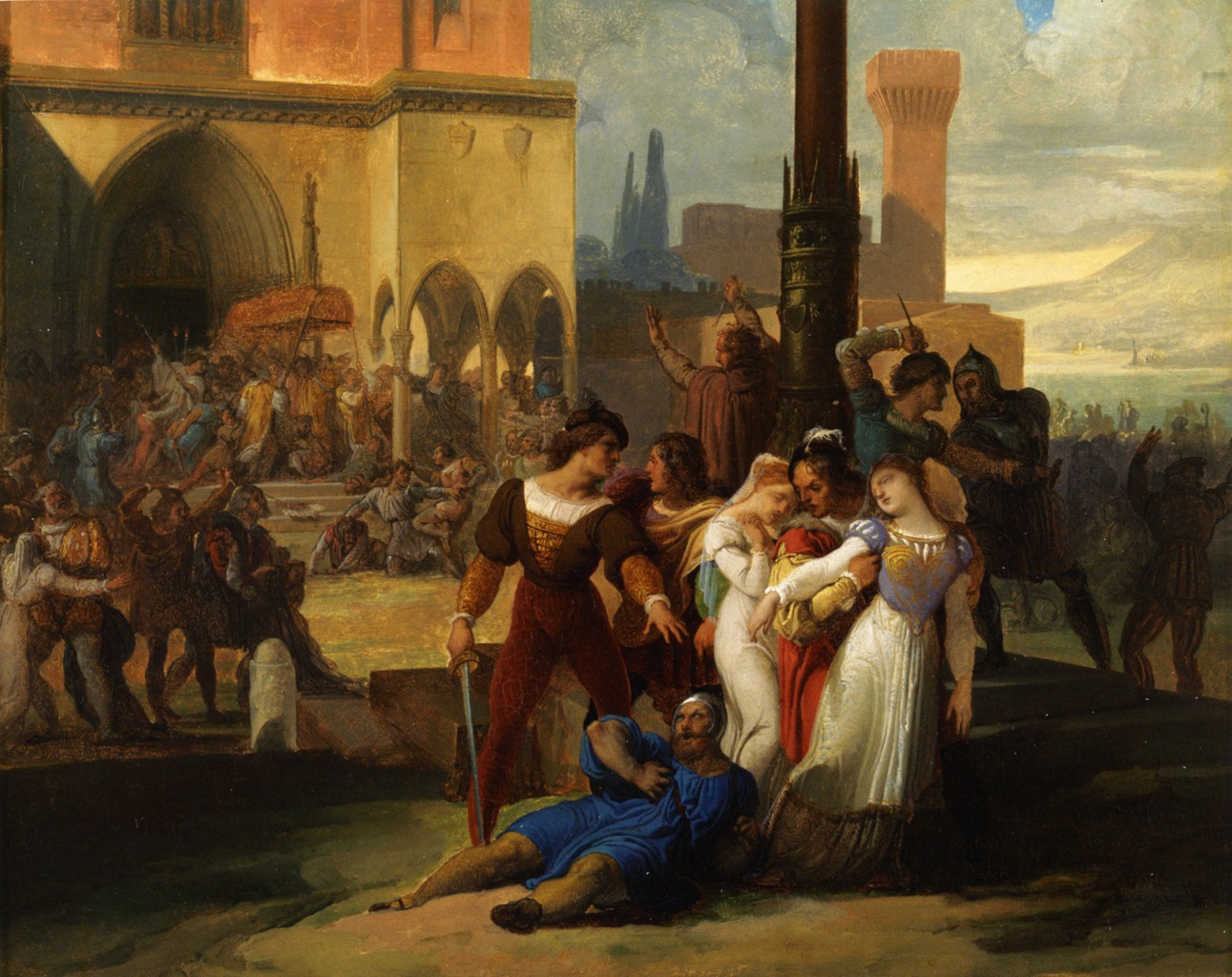
Sicilian Vespers scene 1 (1821–1822)

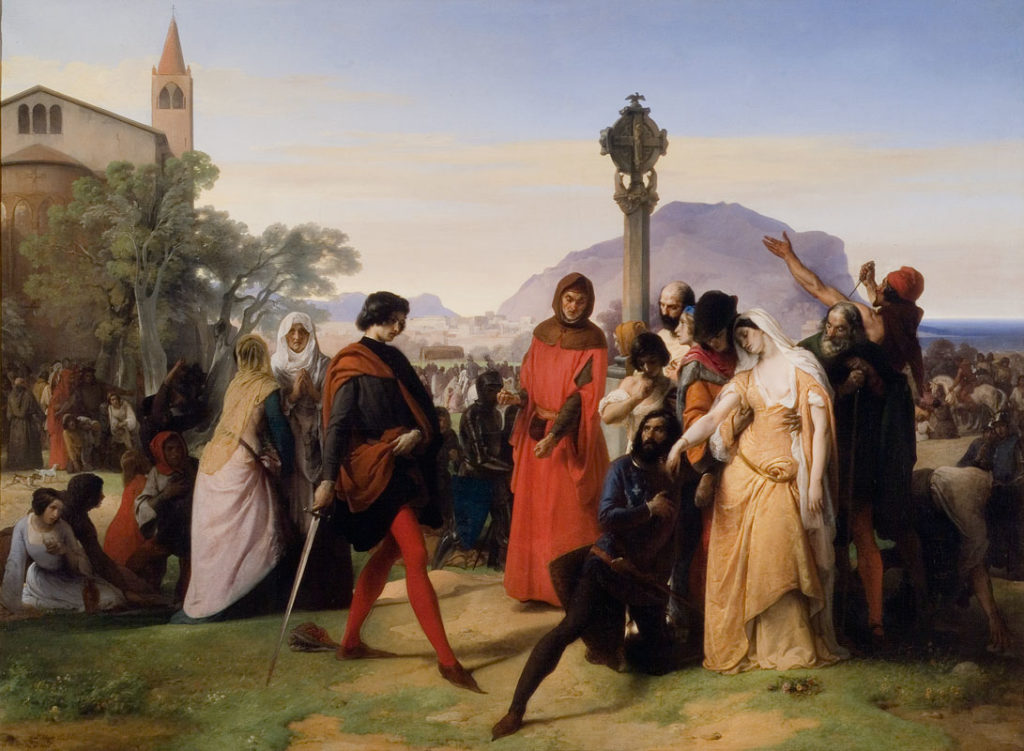
Sicilian Vespers scene 3 (1821–1822)

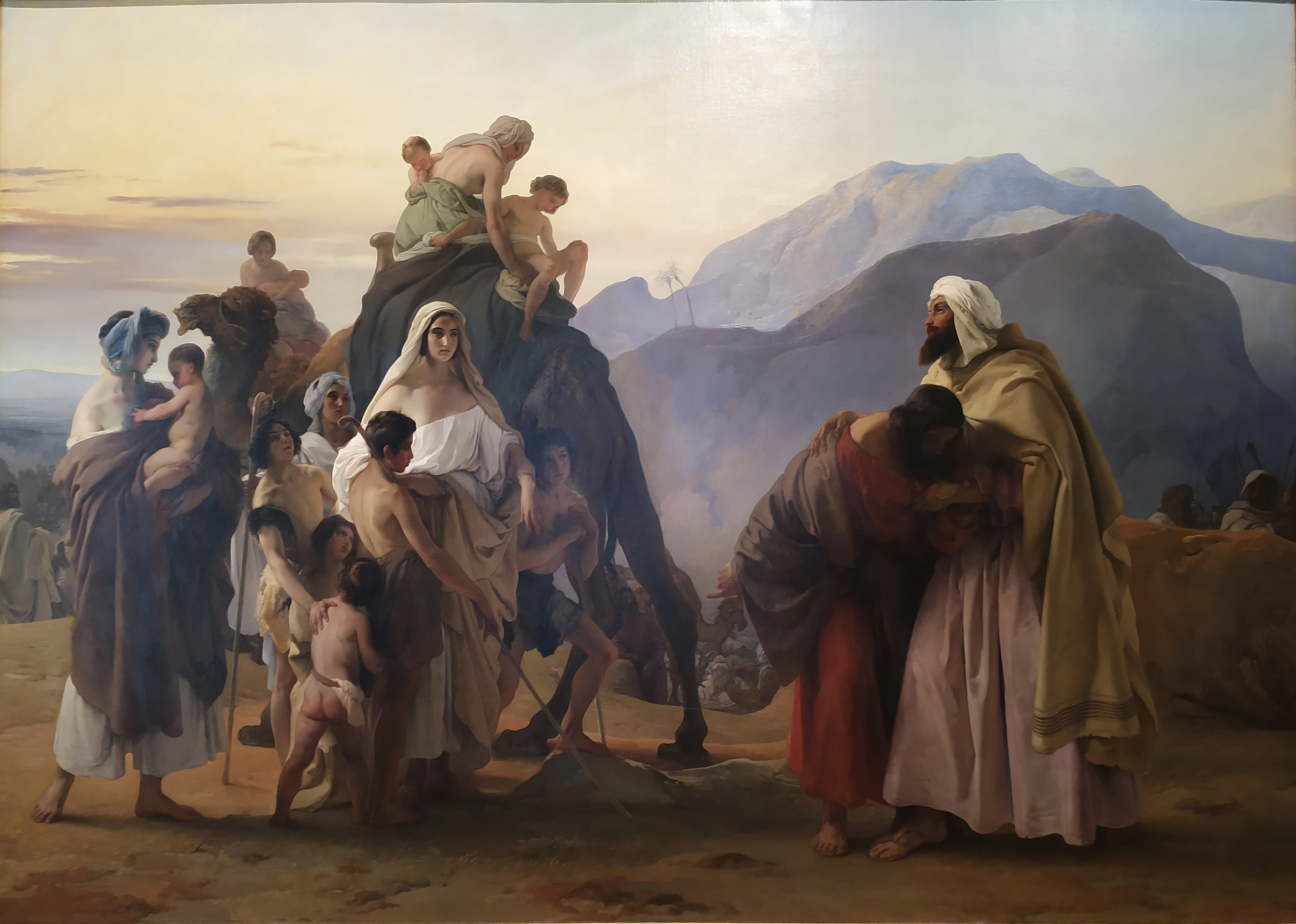
Meeting of Esau and Jacob

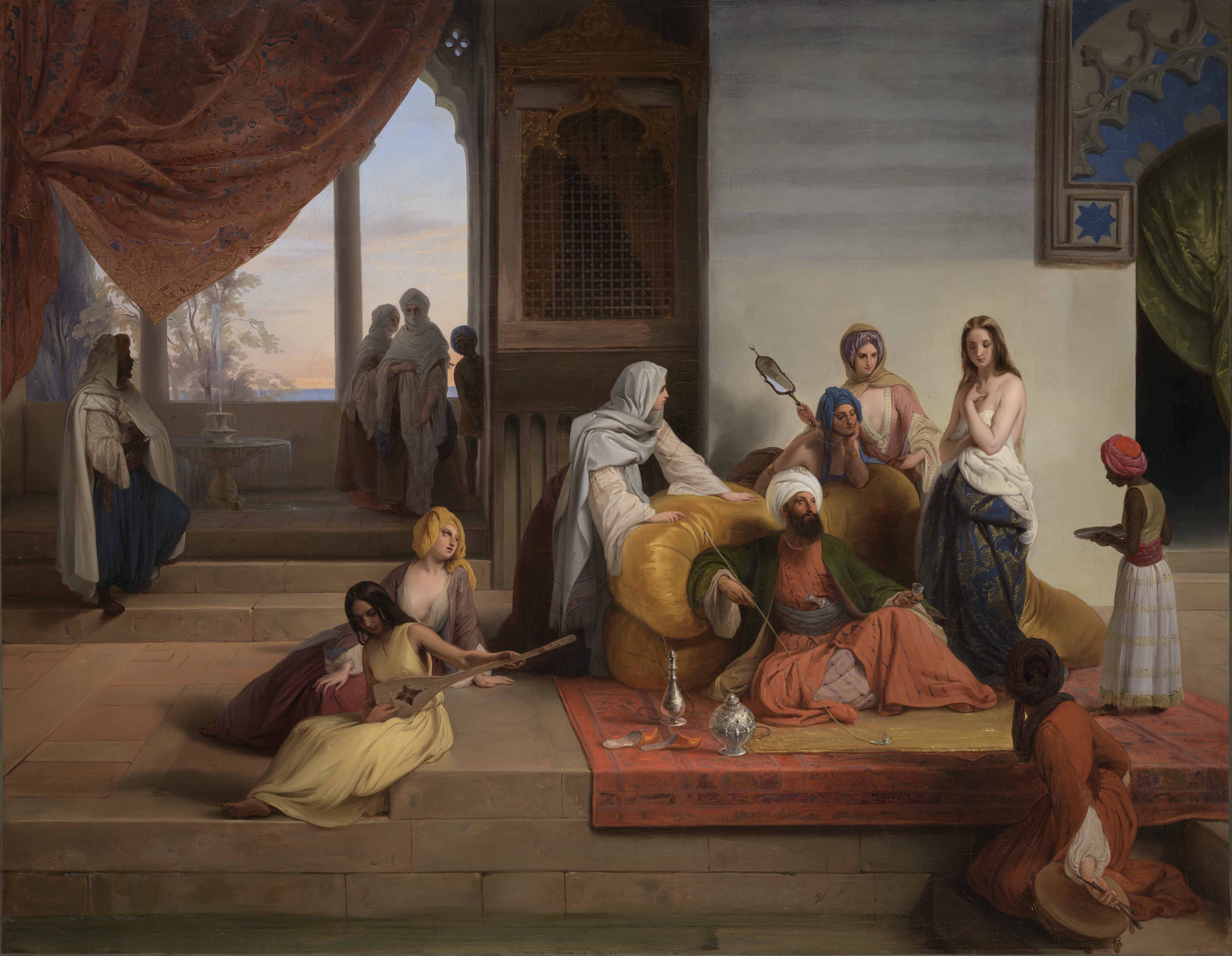
Interior of a Harem

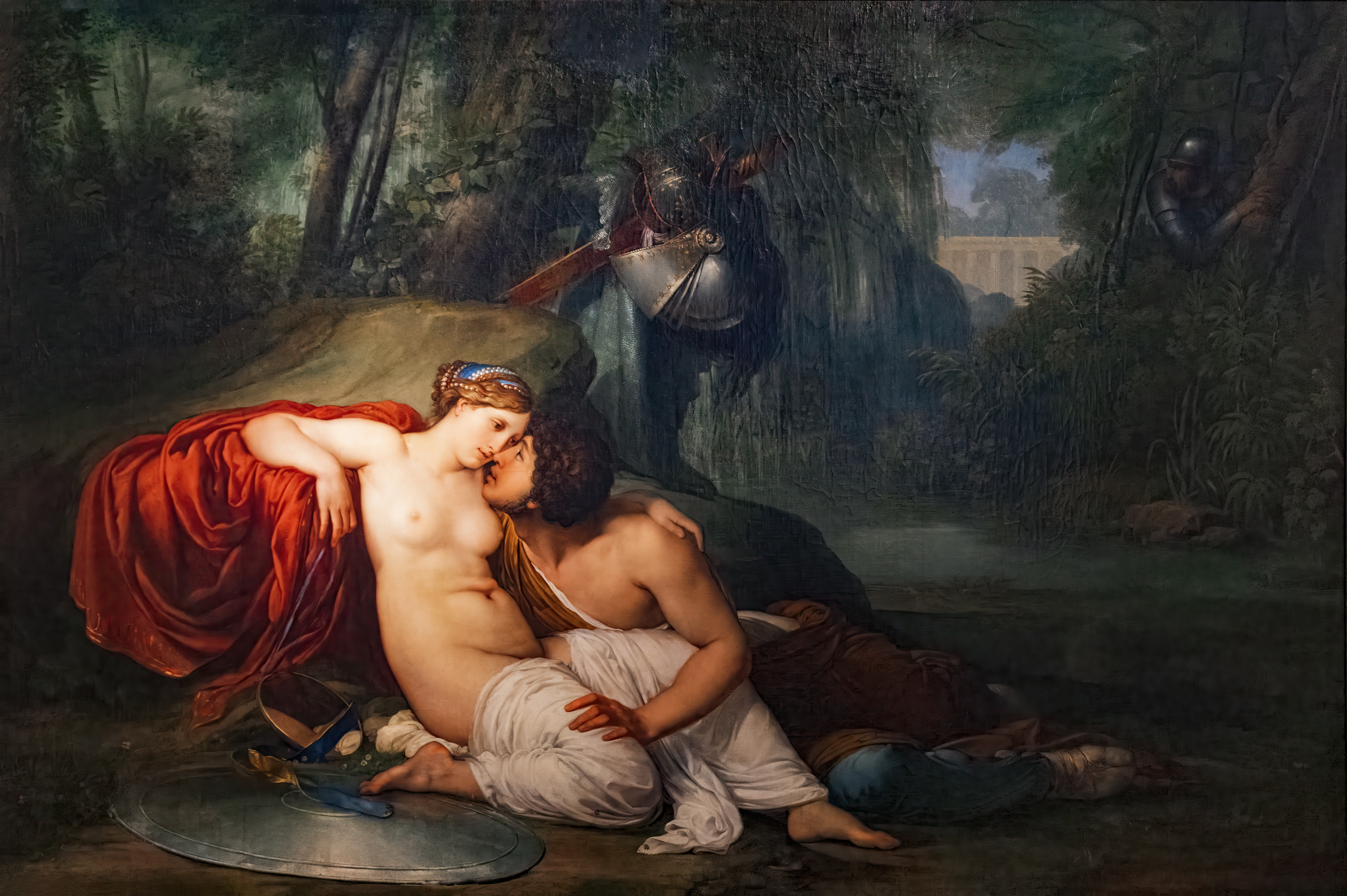
Rinaldo and Armida, 1813

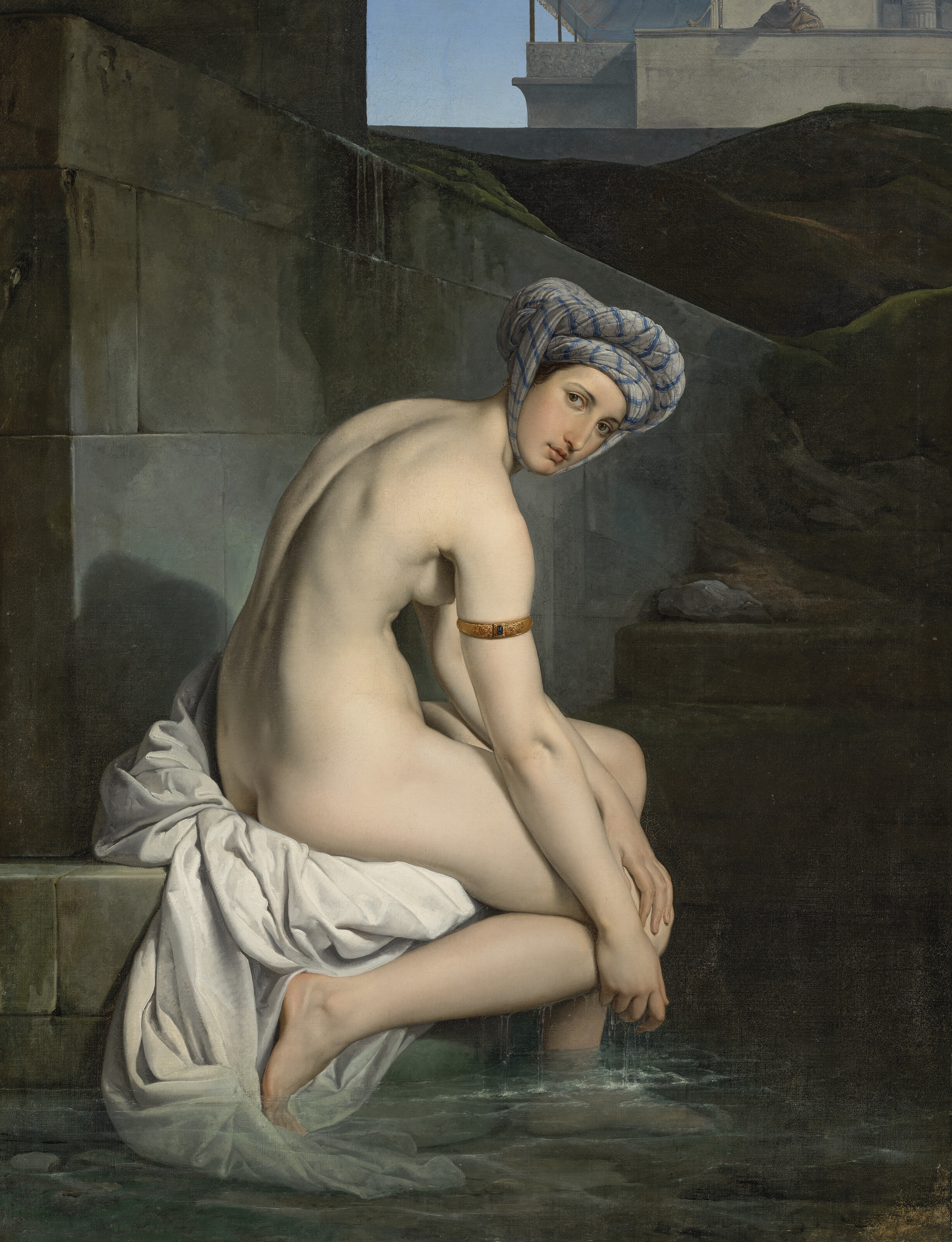
Bathsheba (1827)

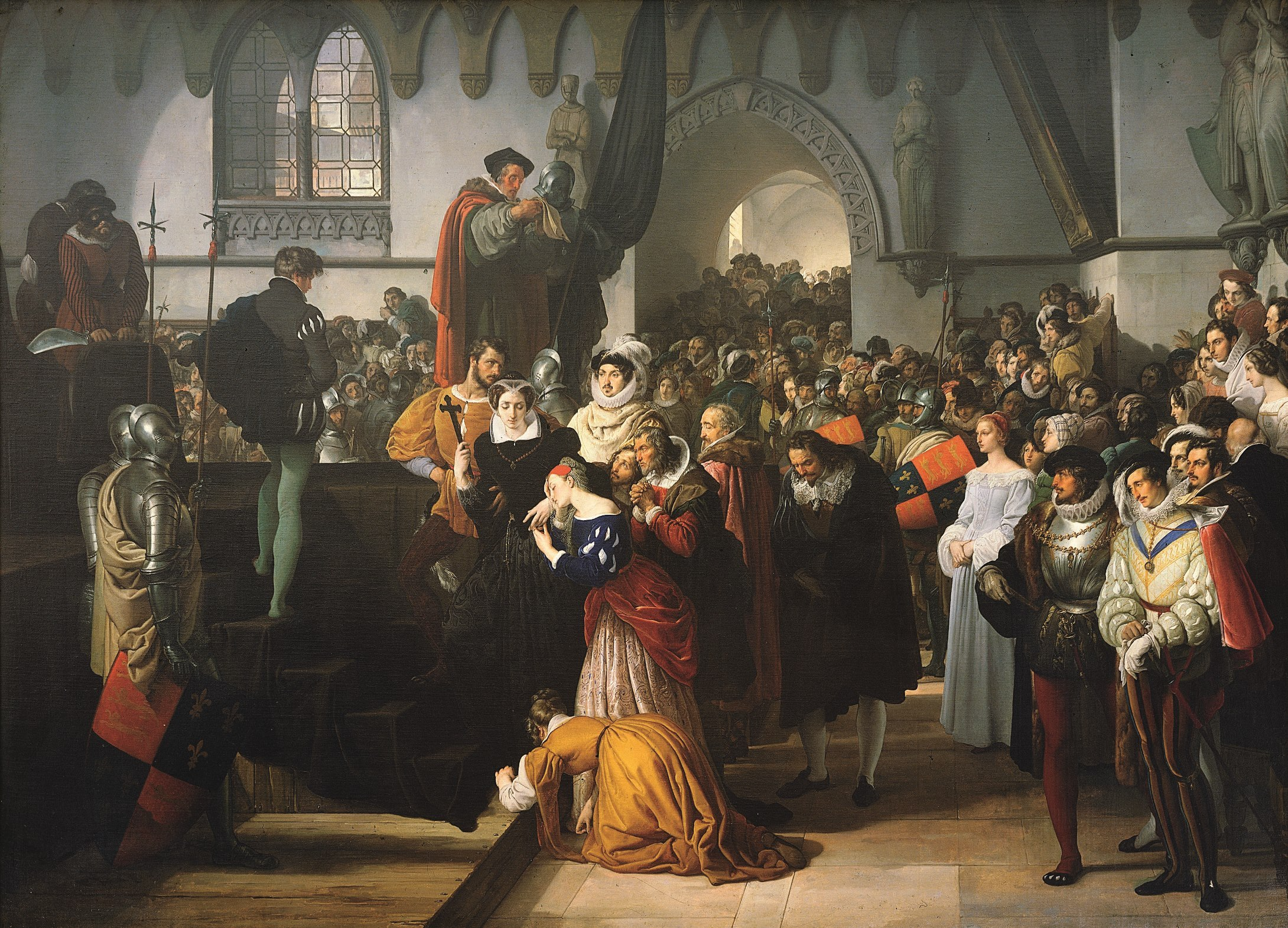
Mary Stuart Ascends the Scaffold (1827)

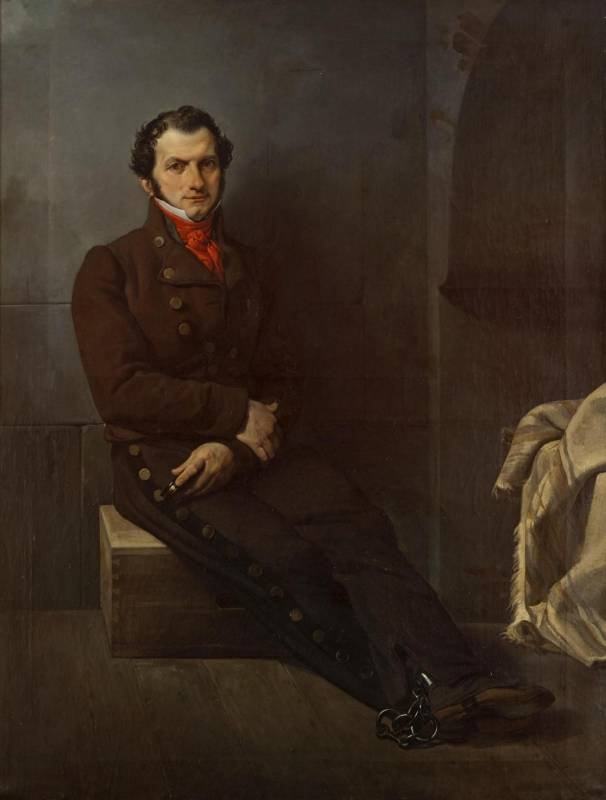
Portrait of Count Arese in Prison (1828)

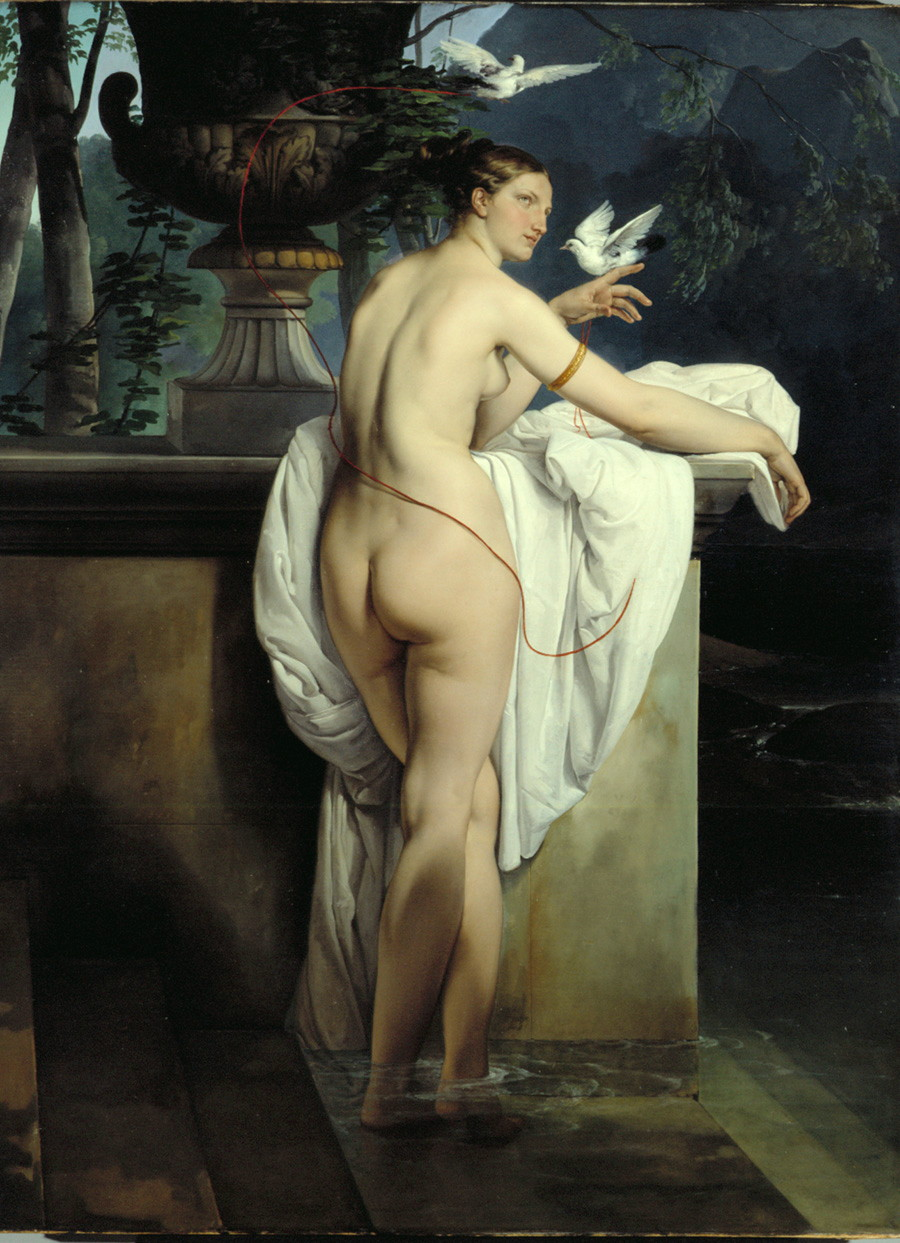
Carlotta Chabert as Venus (1830)

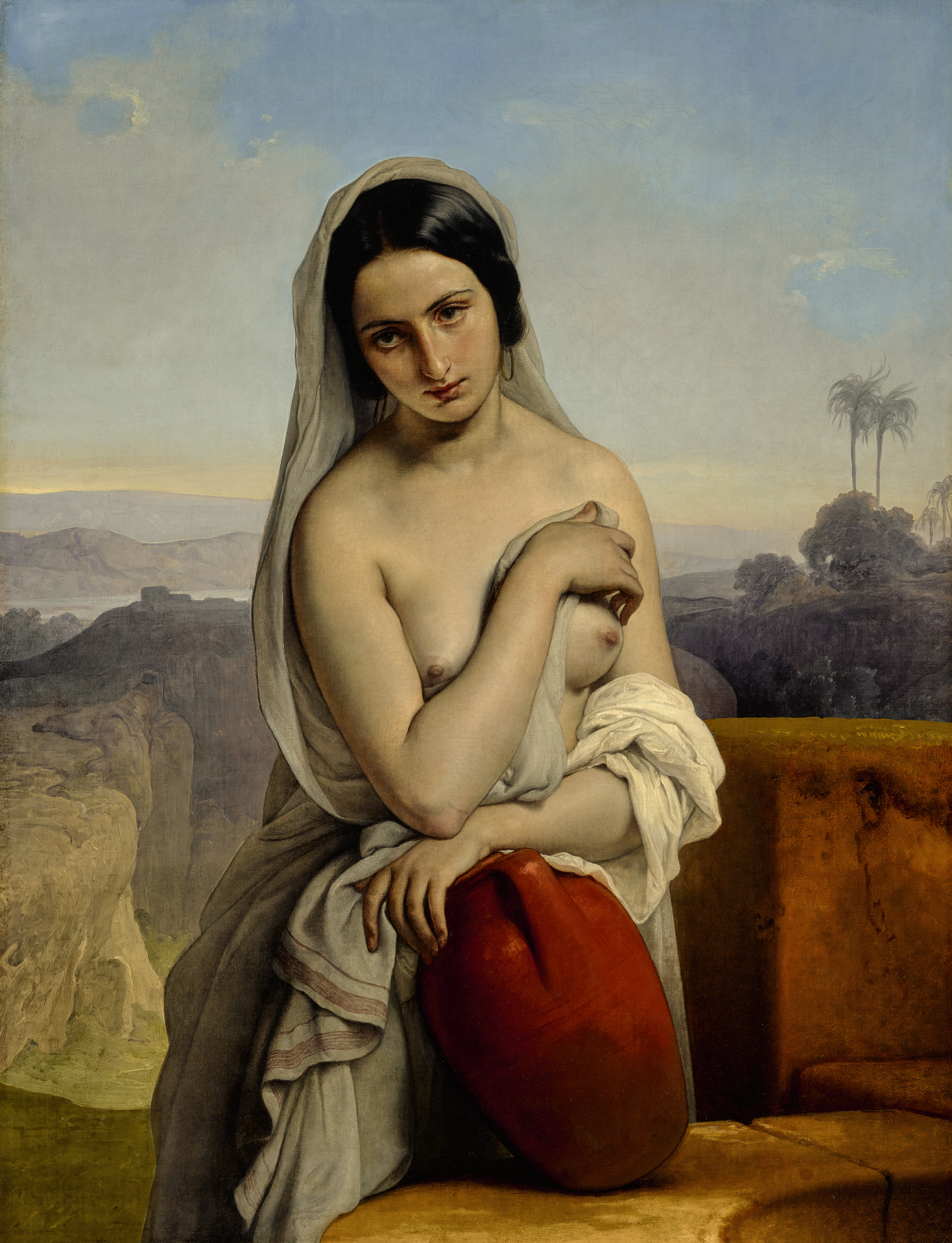
Rebecca at the Well (1831)

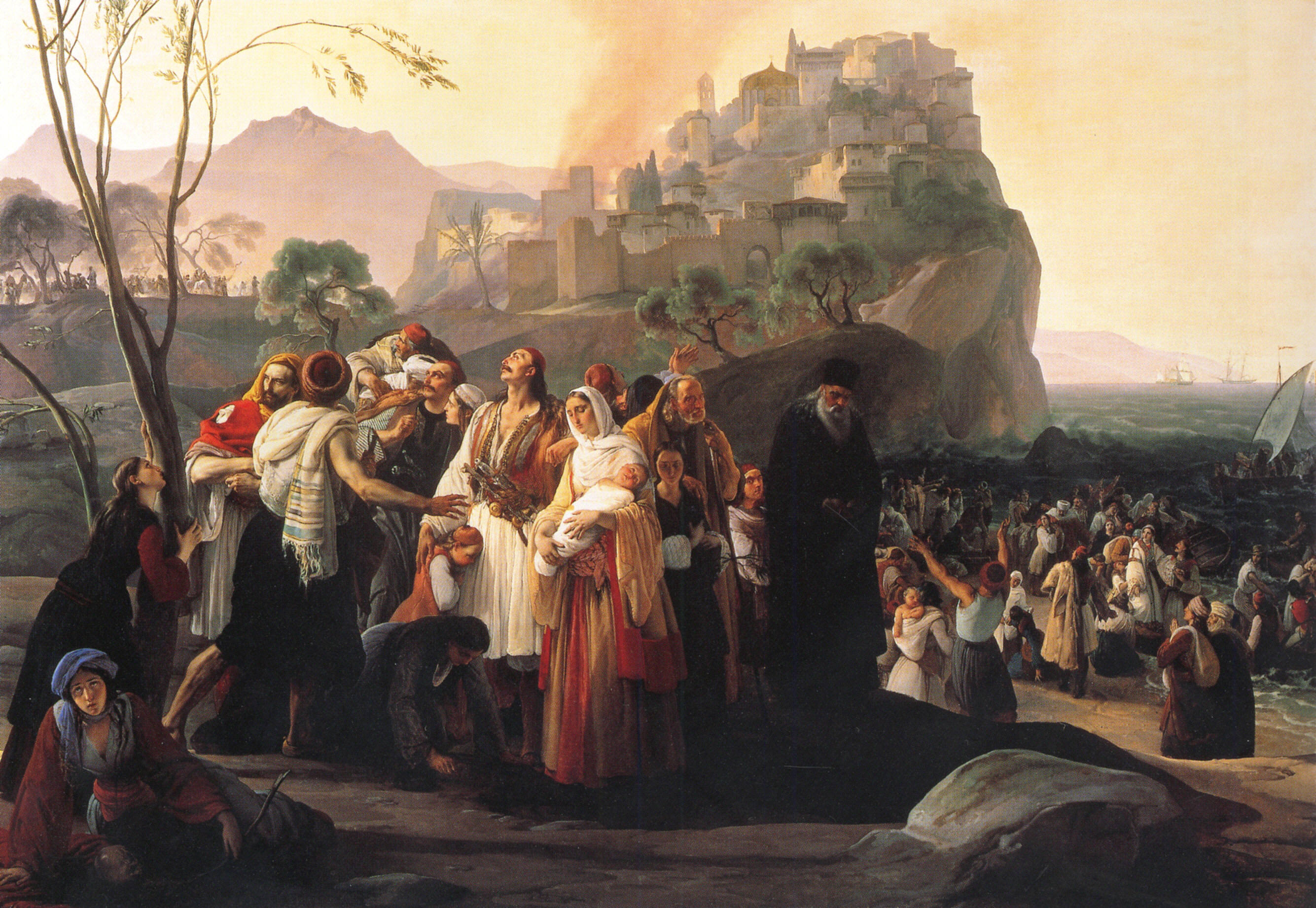
The Refugees of Parga (1831)

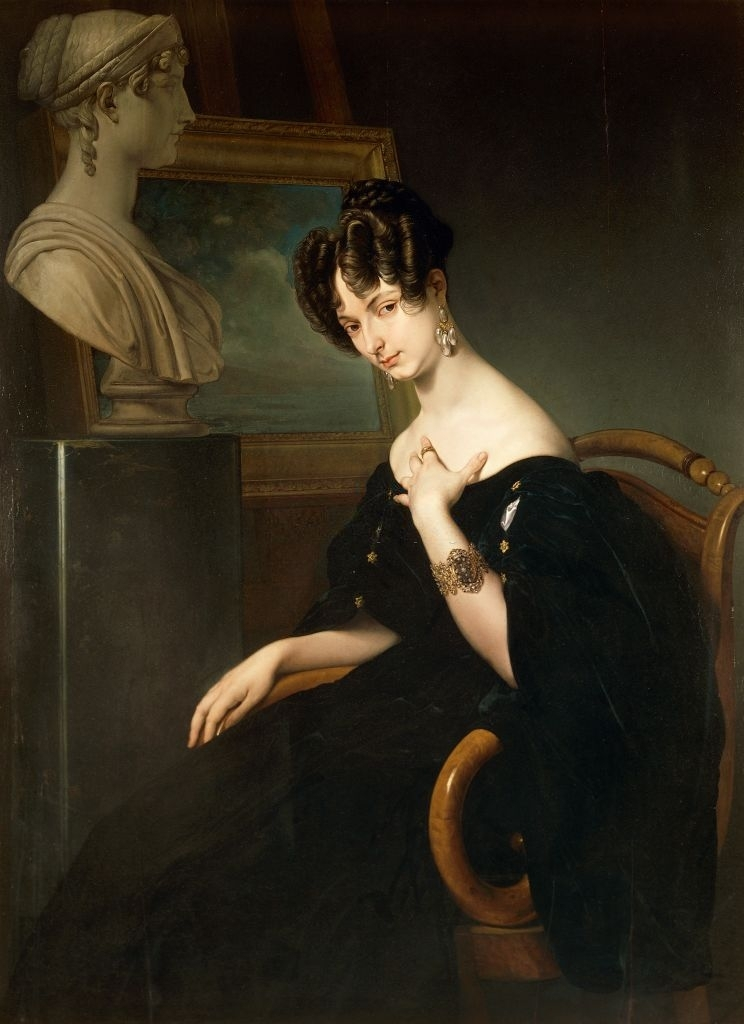
Portrait of Cristina Trivulzio Belgiojoso (1831)

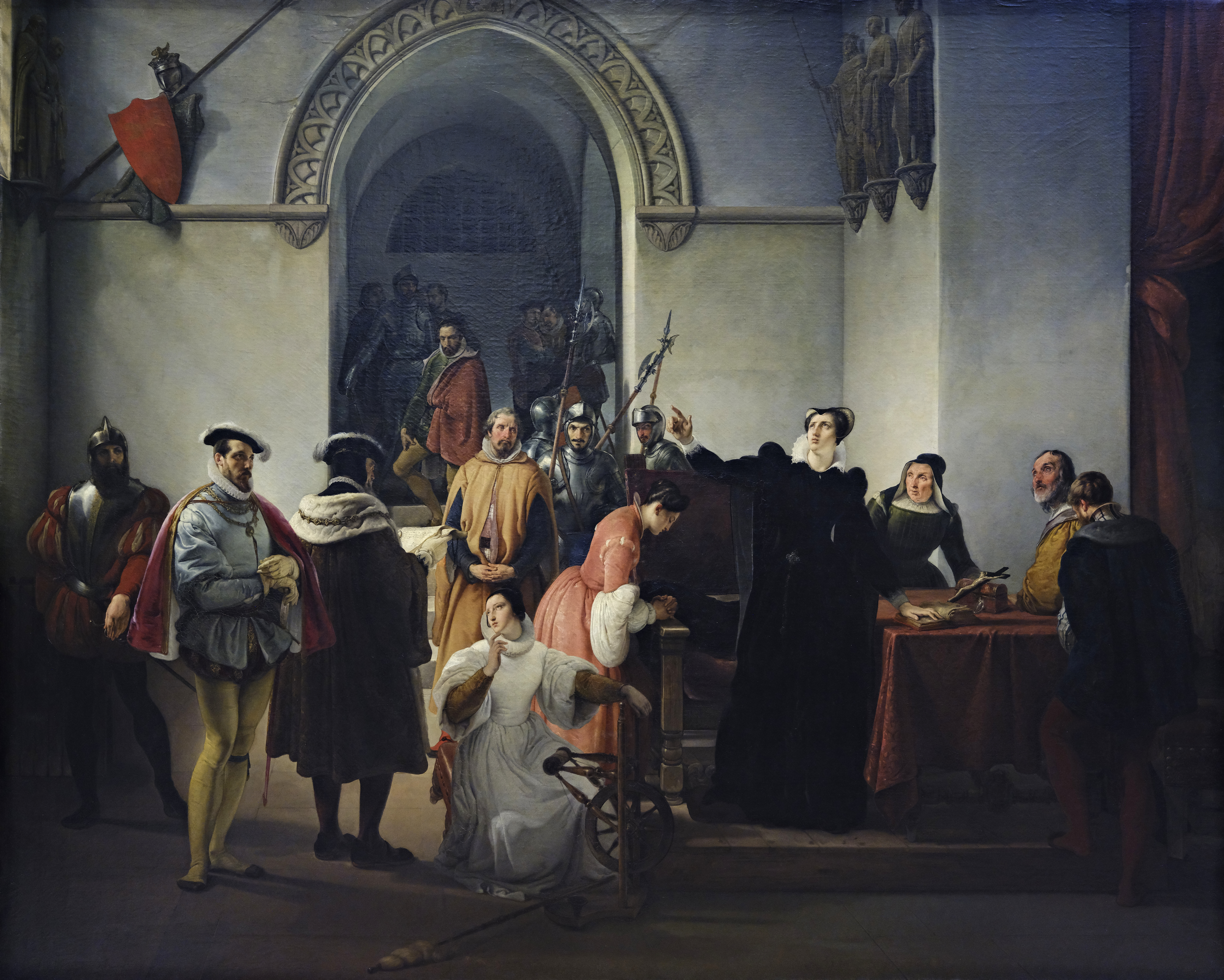
Mary Stuart Proclaiming Her Innocence (1832)

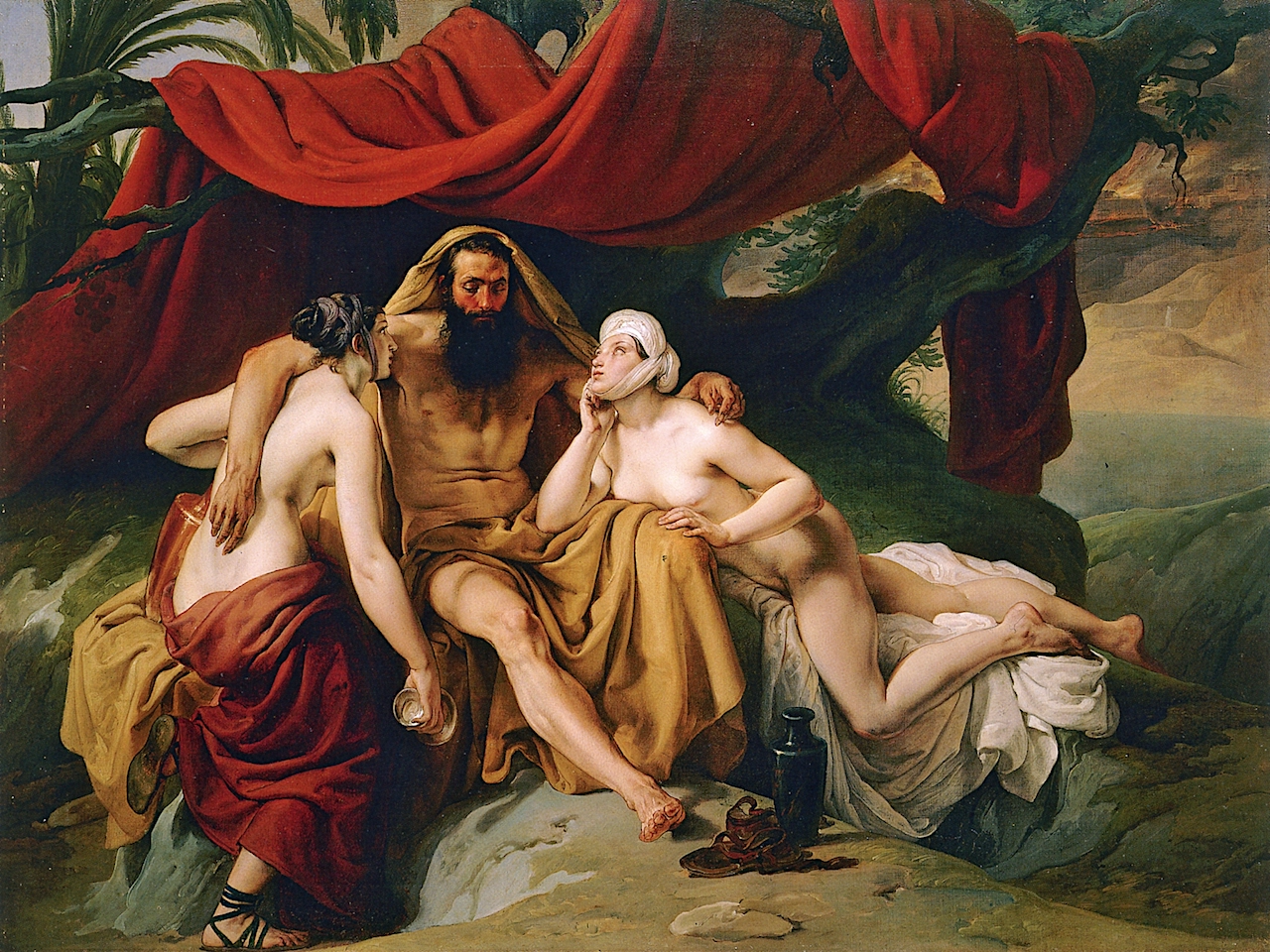
Lot and His Daughters (1833)

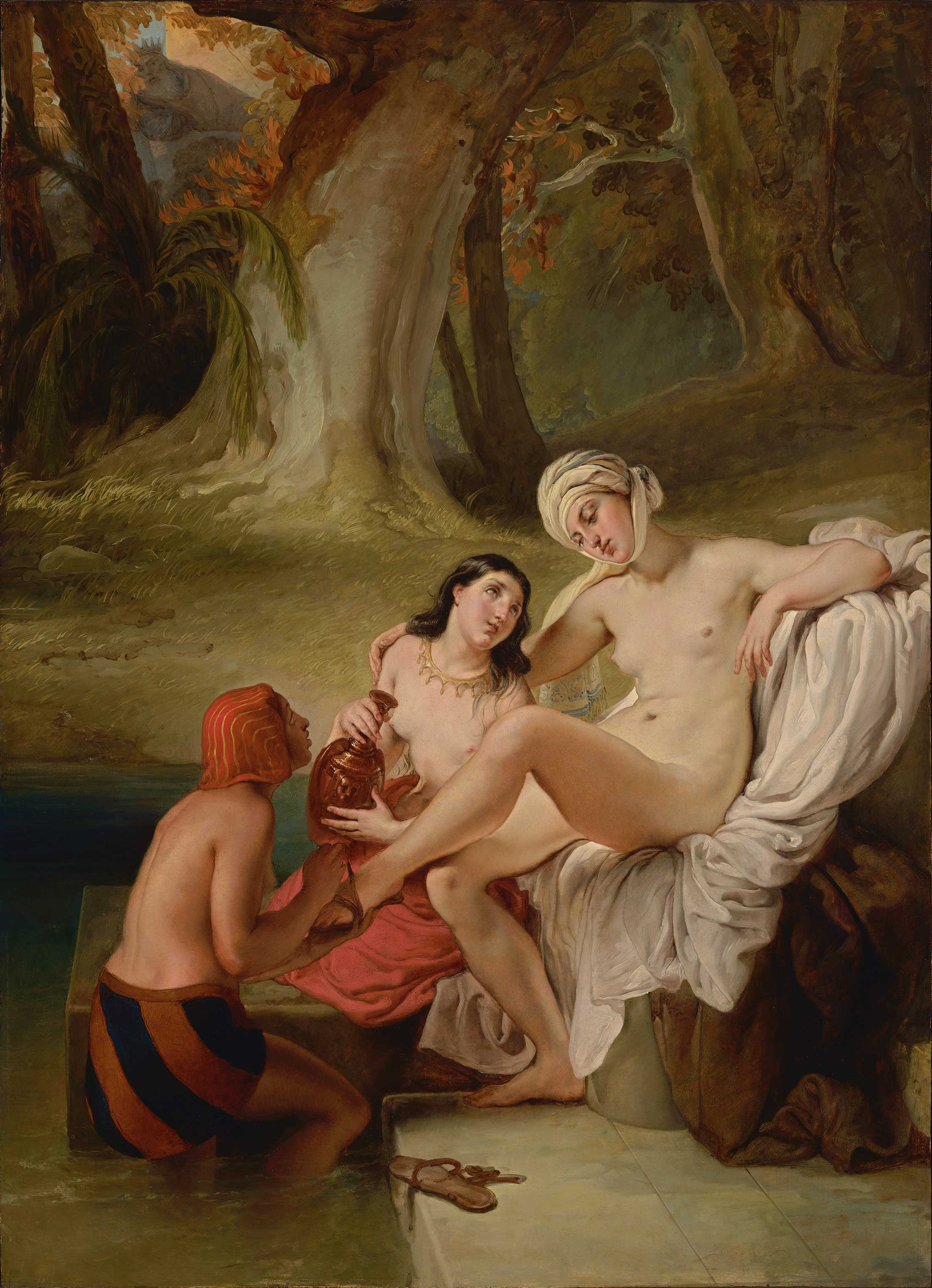
Bathsheba at Her Bath (1834)

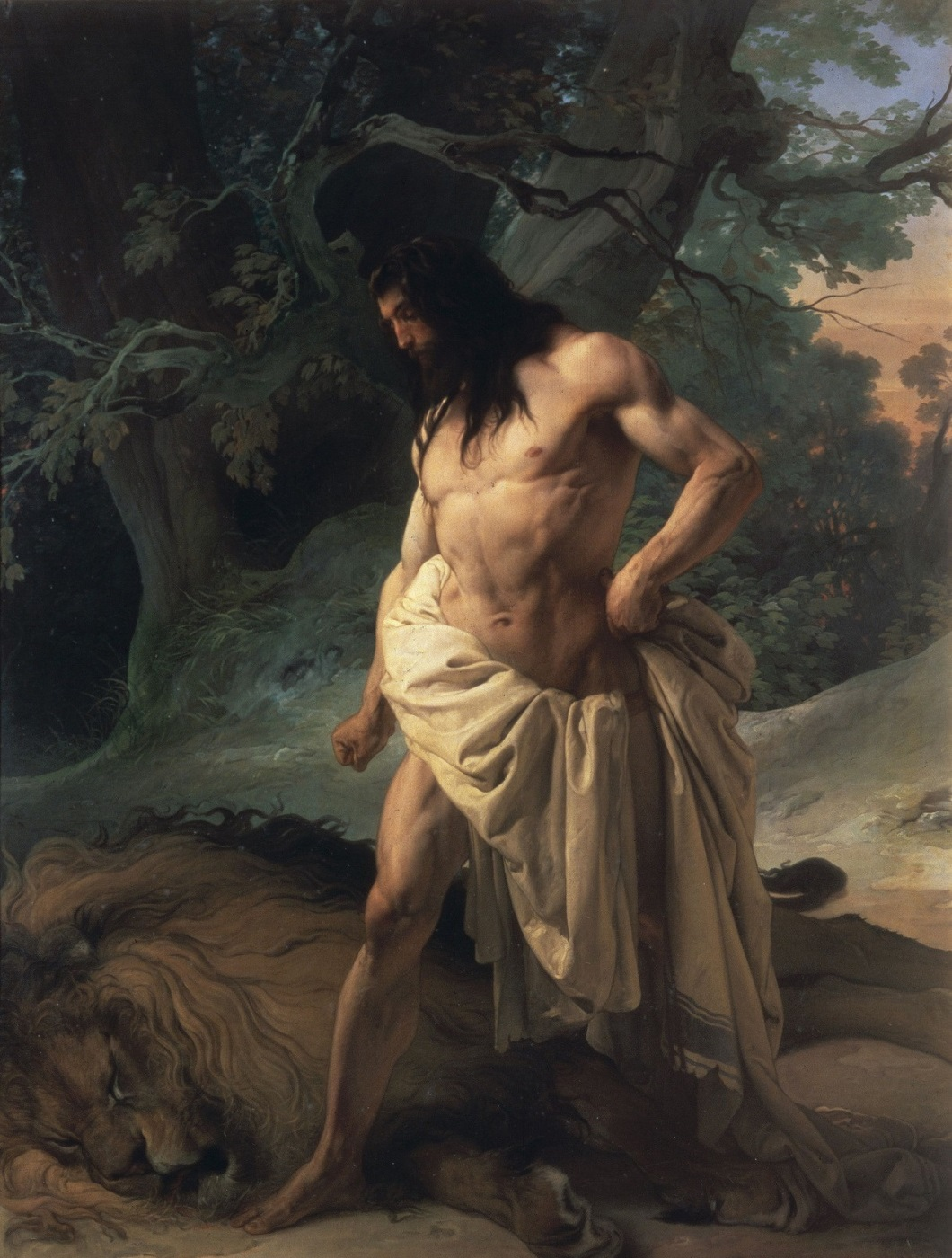
Samson and the Lion (1842)

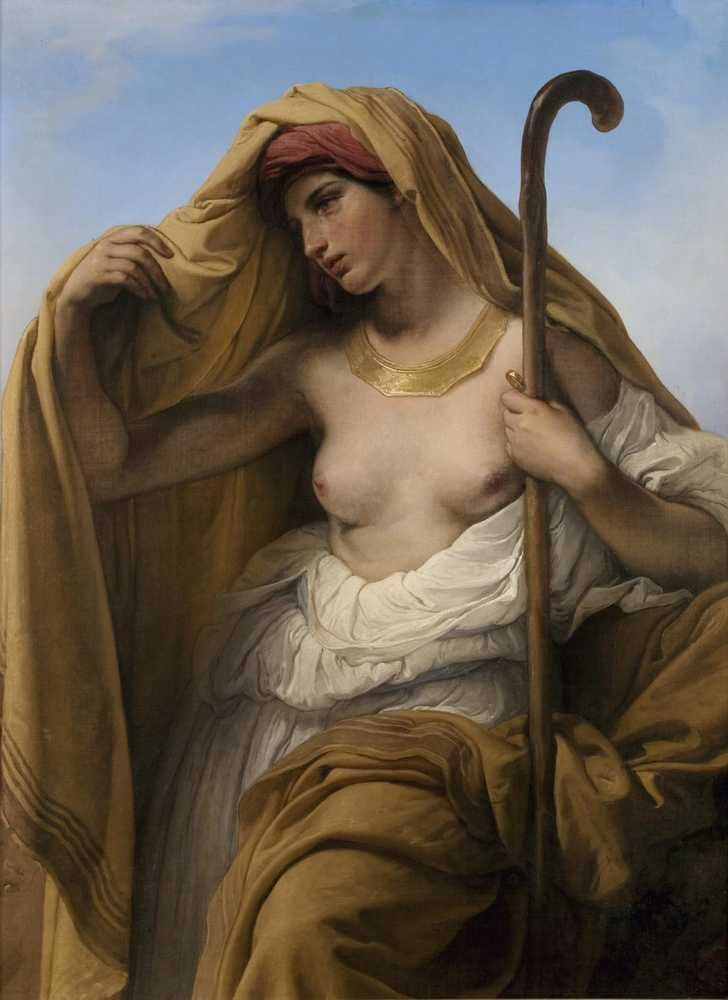
Tamar (1847)

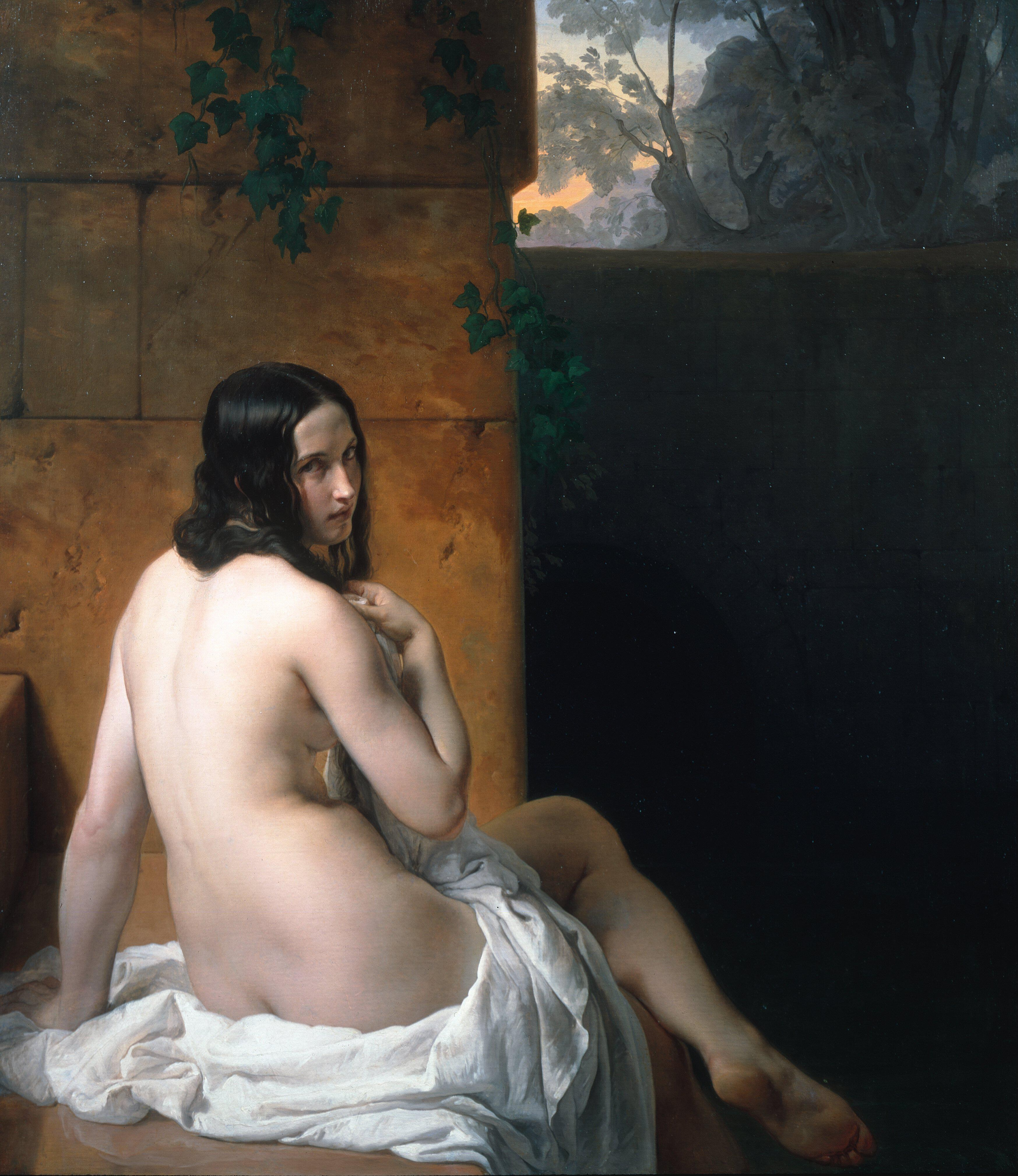
Susanna at her Bath (1850)

Meditation (1851)

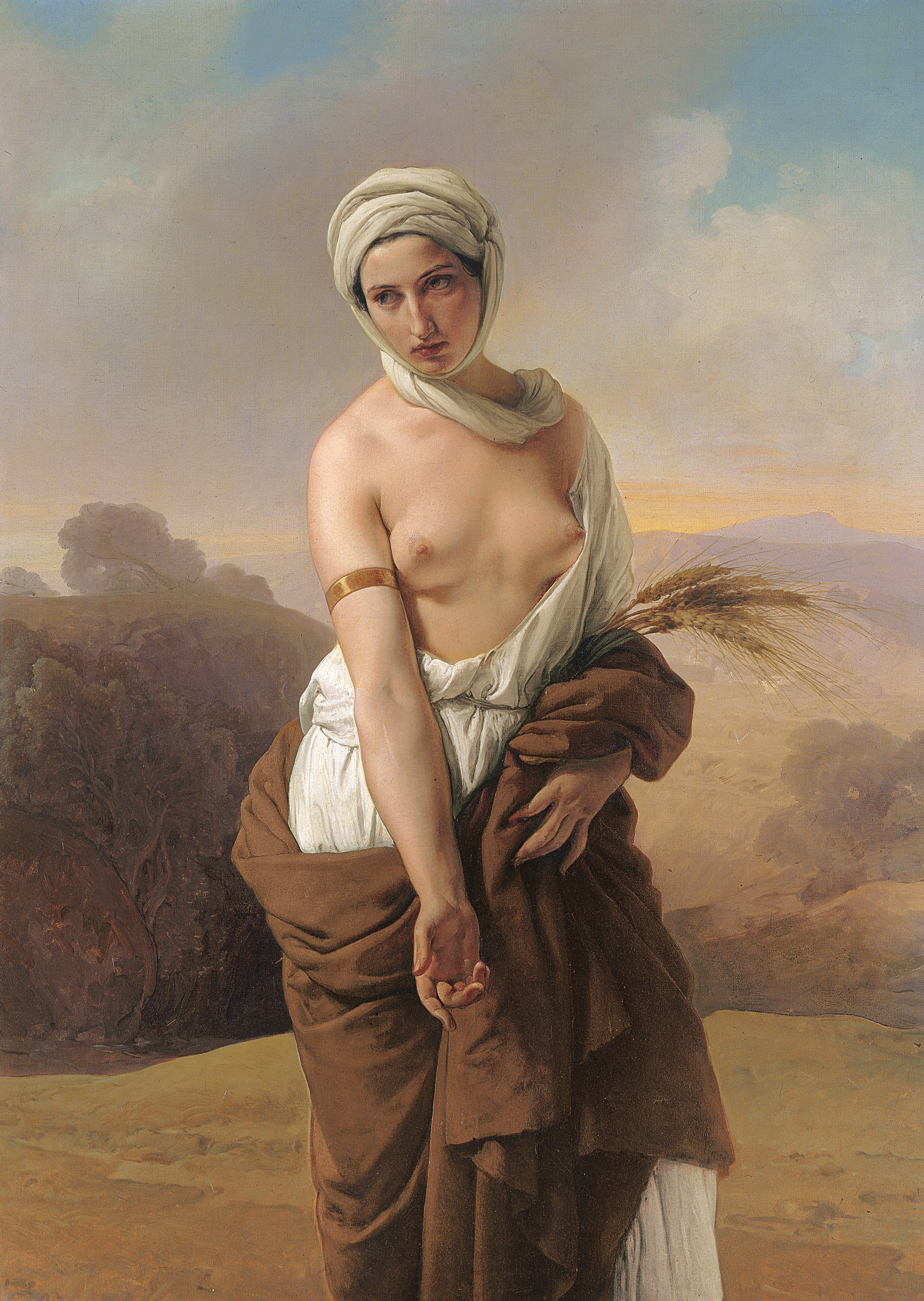
Ruth (1853)

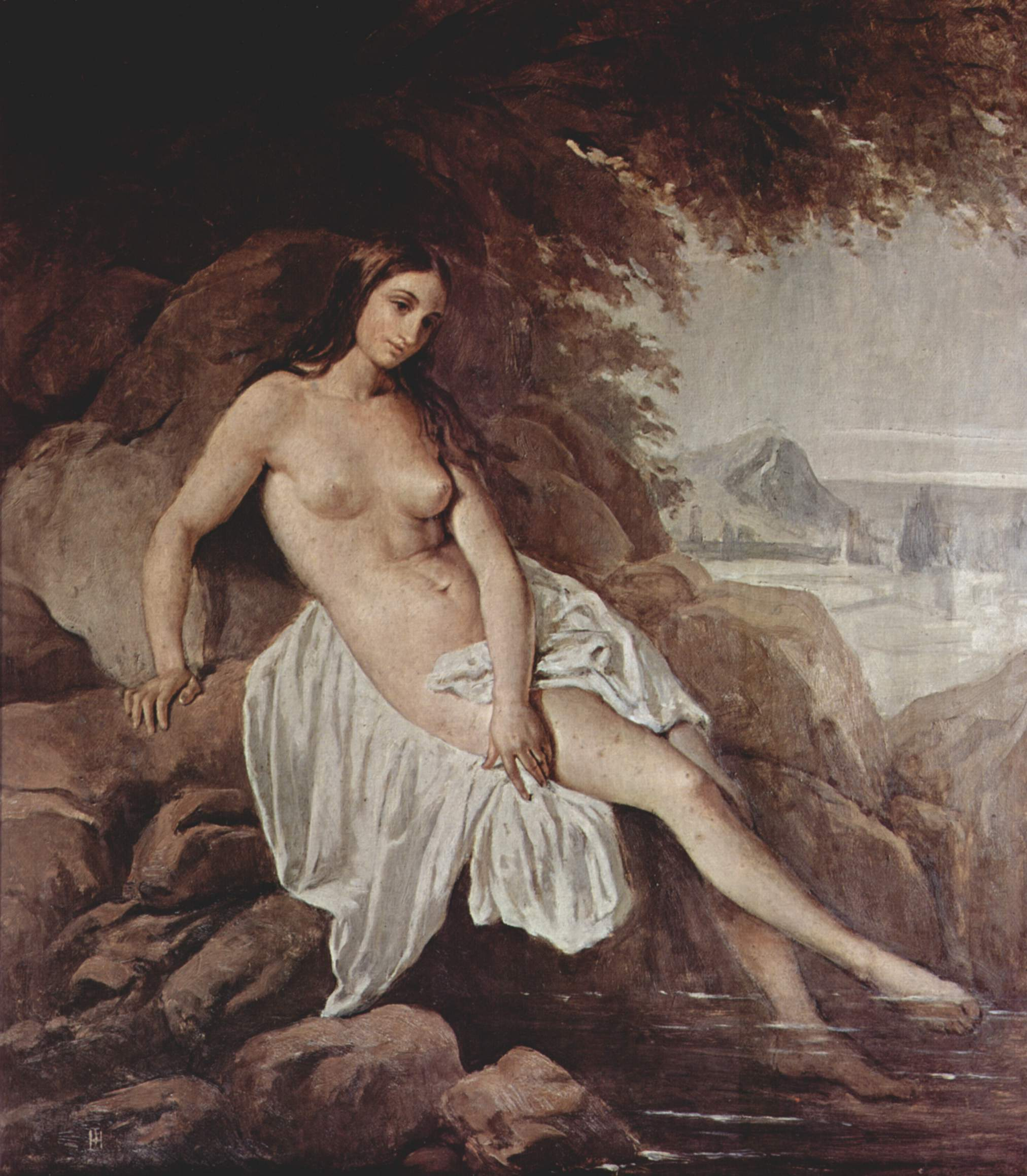
Nude Bather

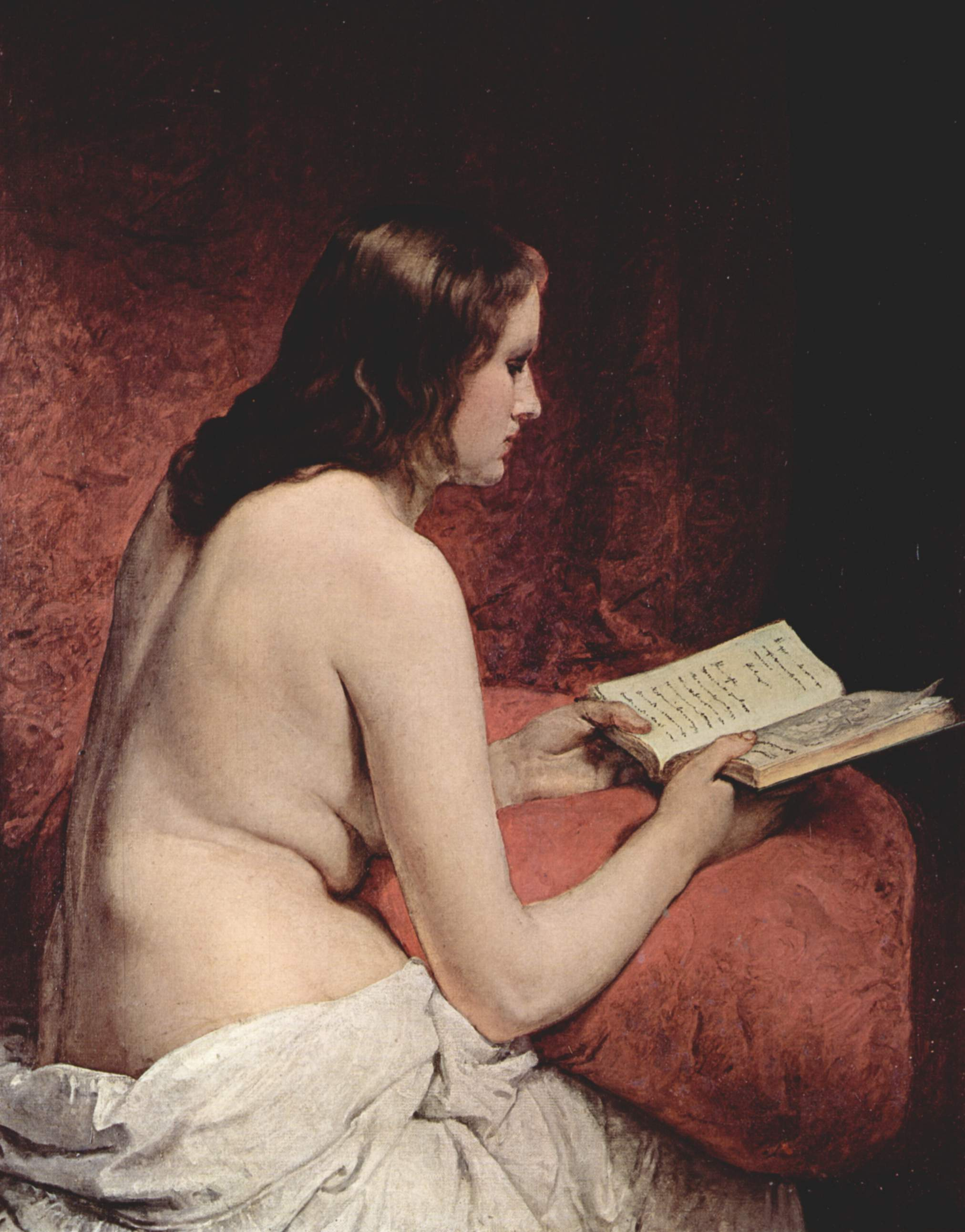
Odalisque with Book (1867)

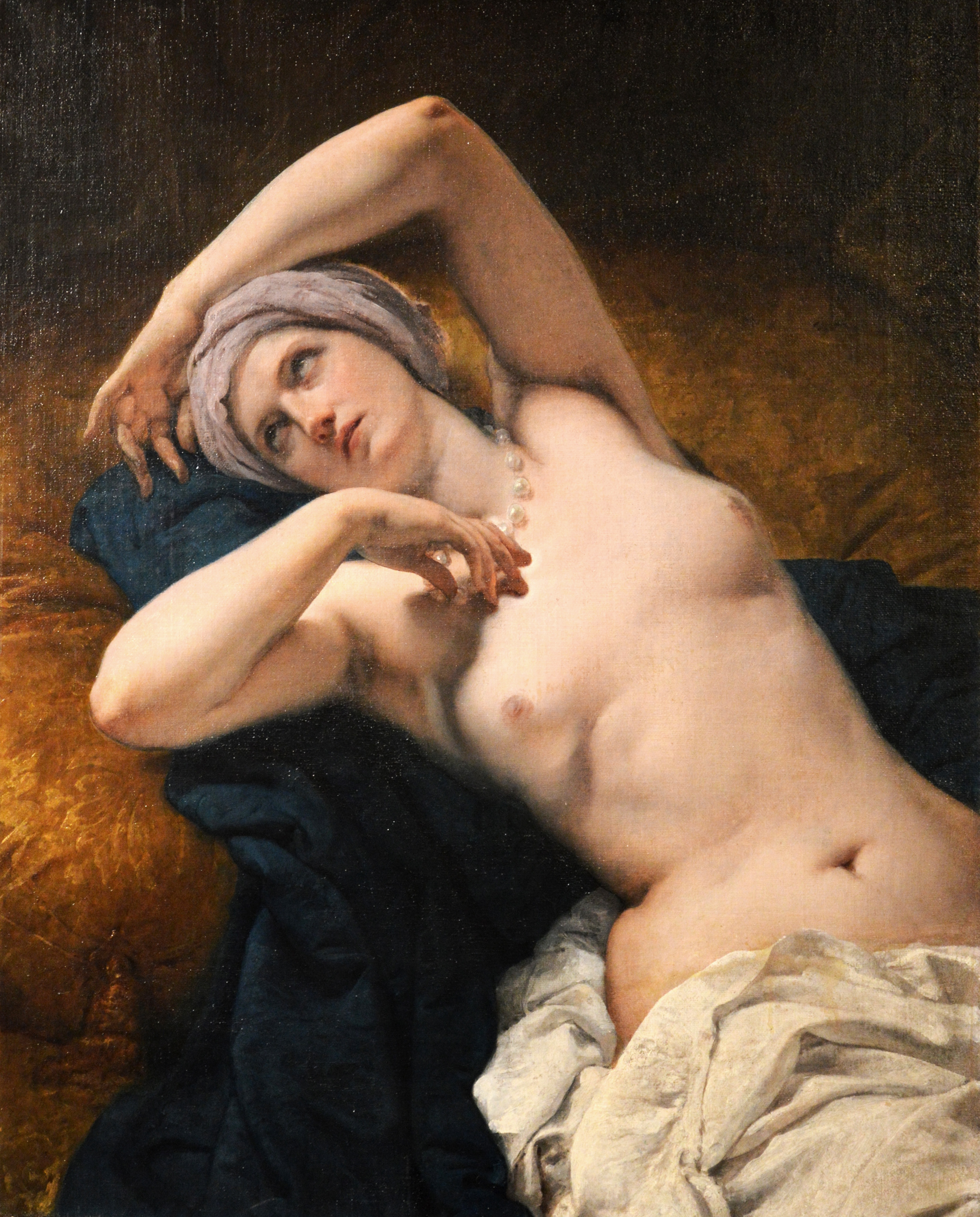
Odalisque in Her Sleep, 1867

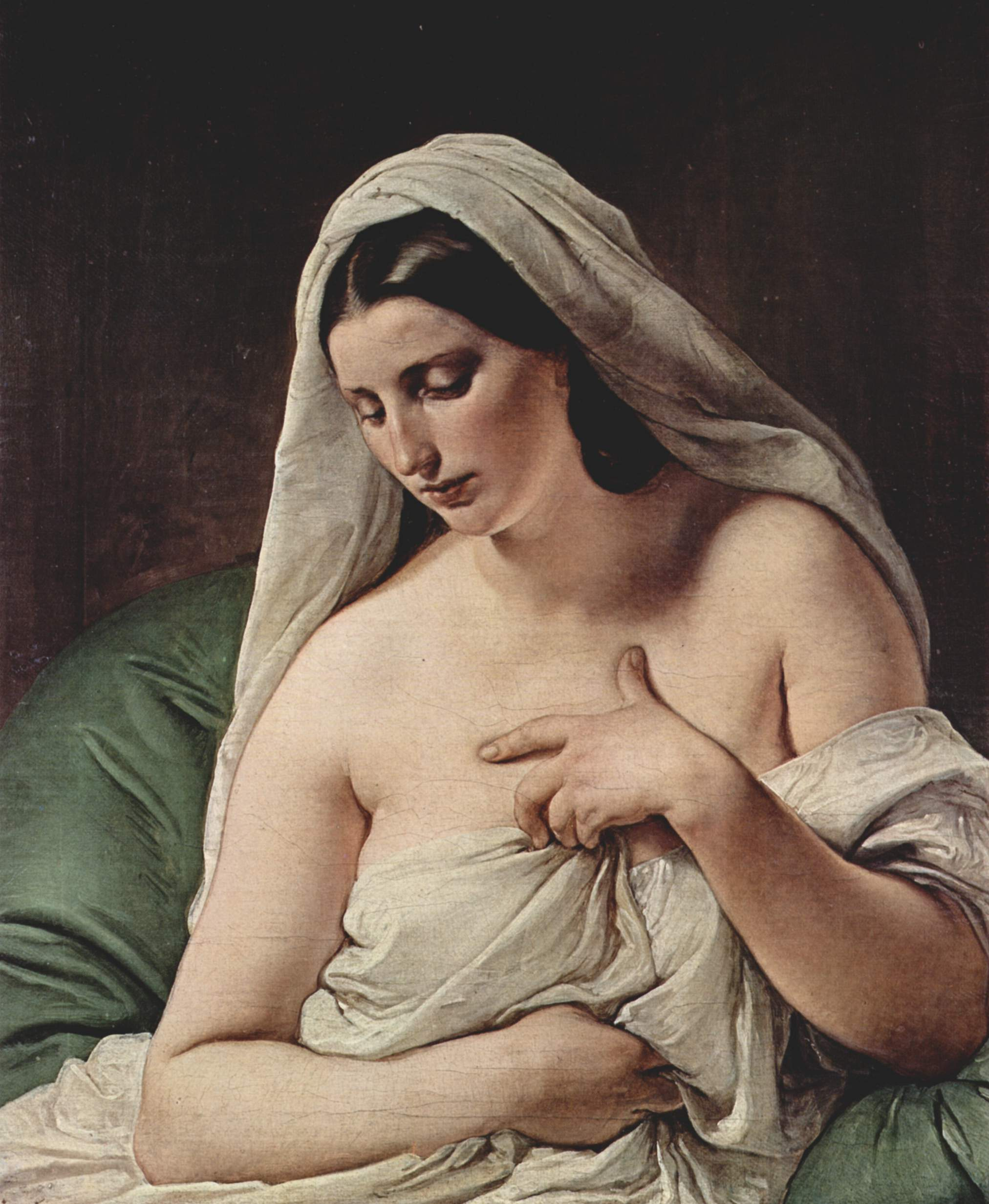
Odalisque (1867)

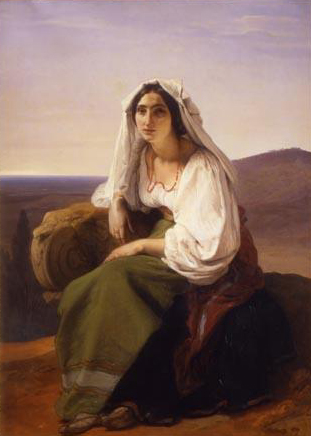
Ciociara

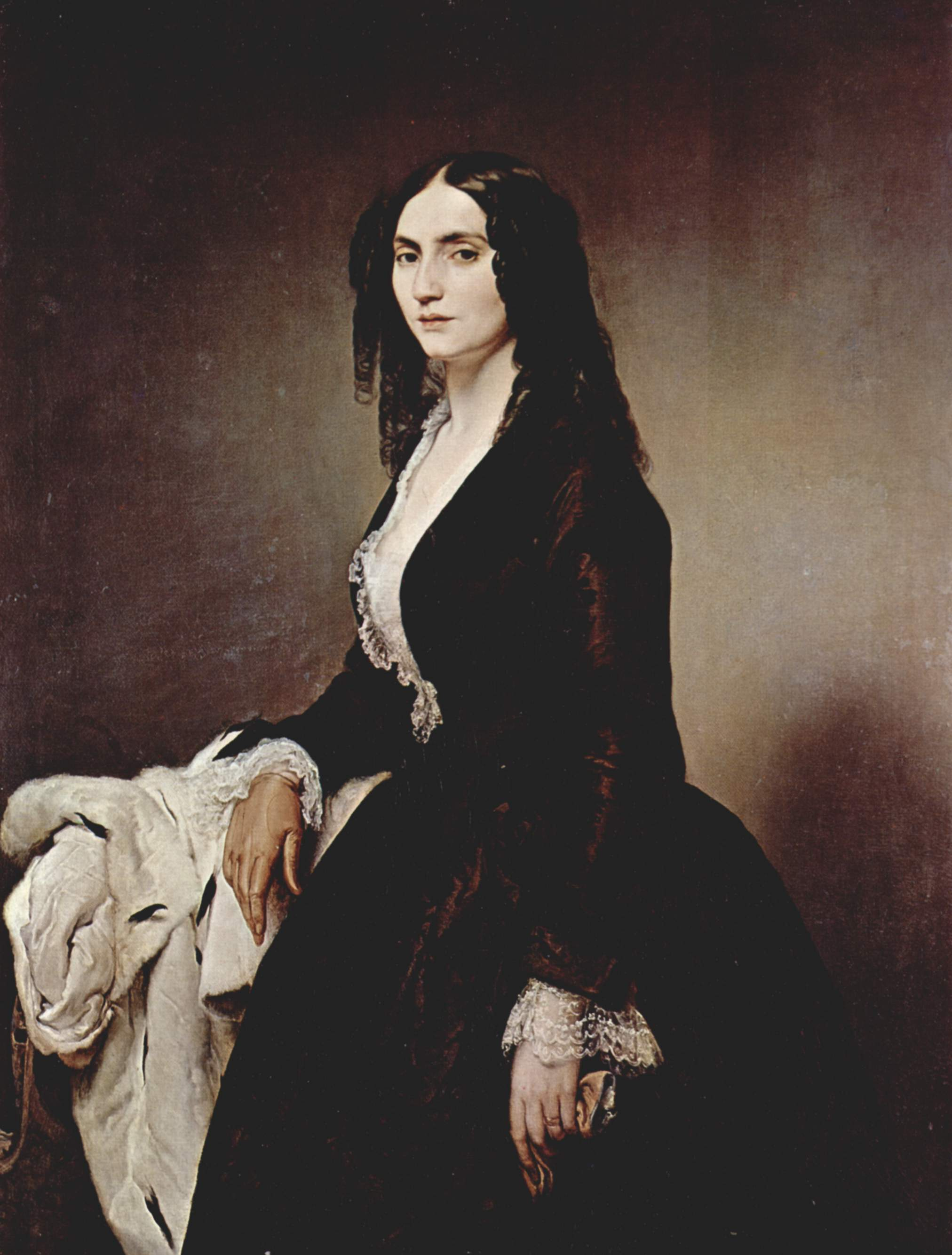
Portrait, Matilde Juva-Branca (1851)

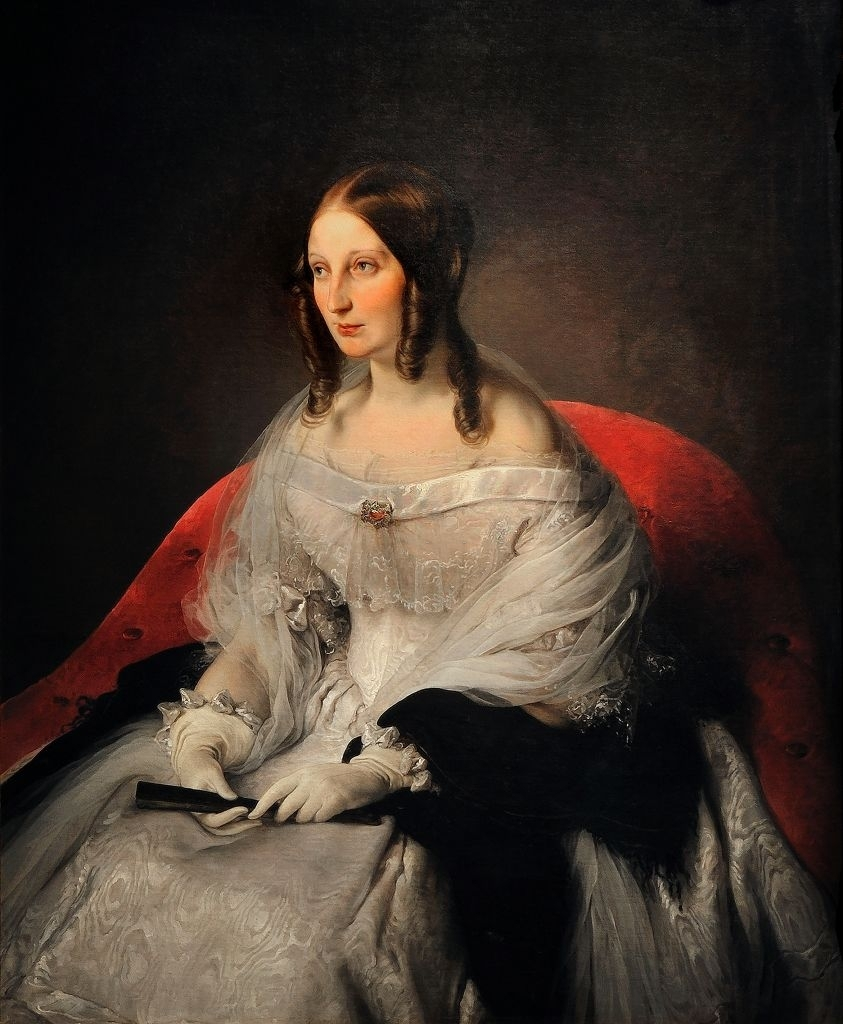
Portrait, Princess di Sant' Antimo (1840–1844)

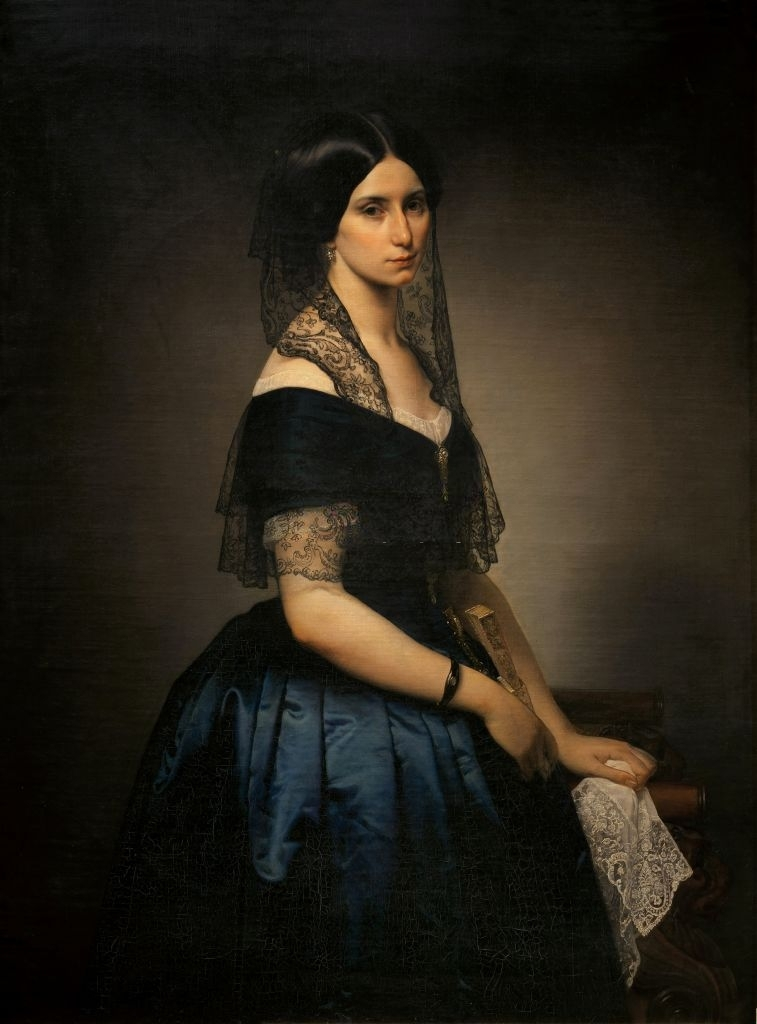
Portrait, Antonietta Tarsis Basilico (1851)

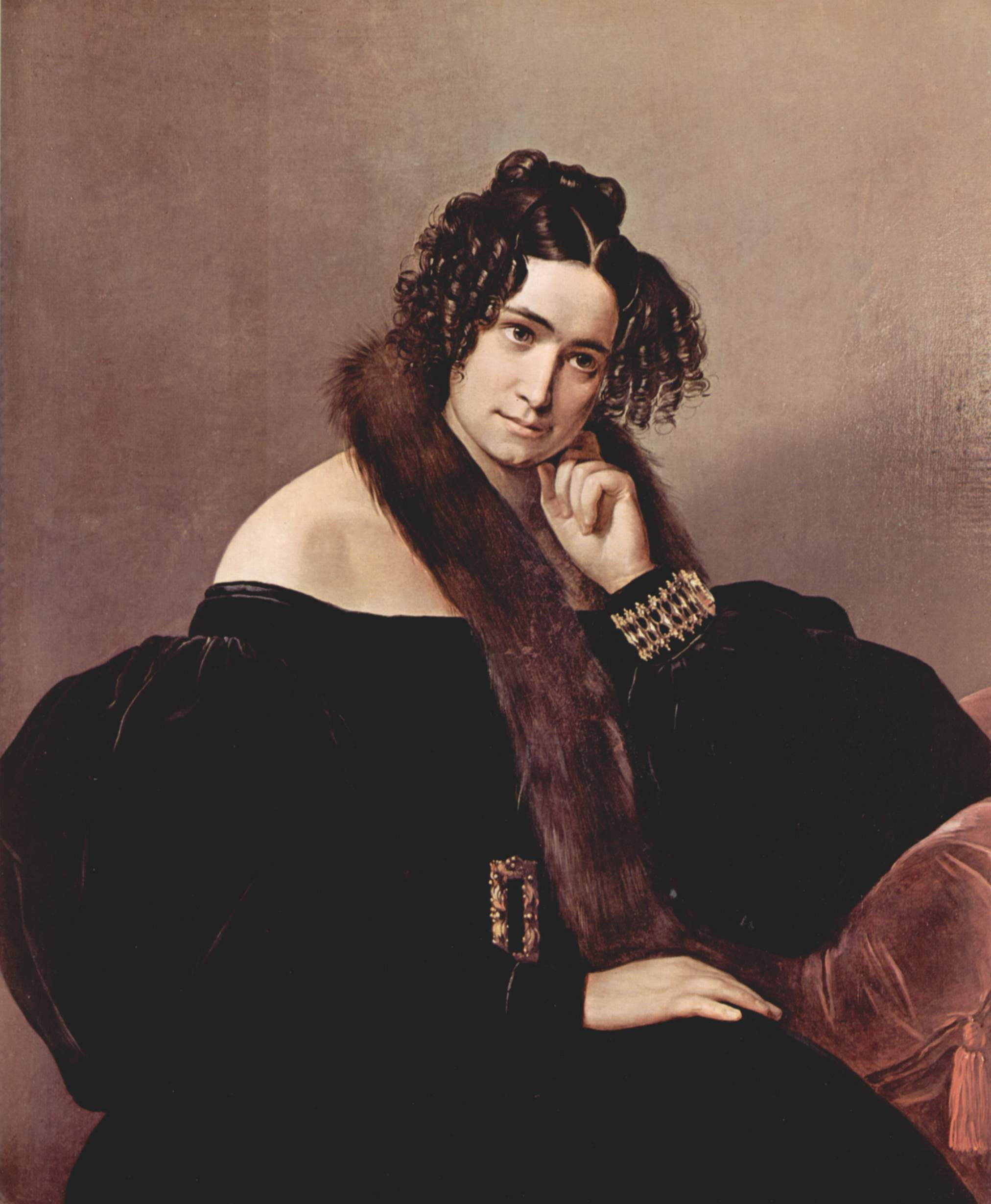
Portrait, Felicina Caglio Perego di Cremnago (1842)

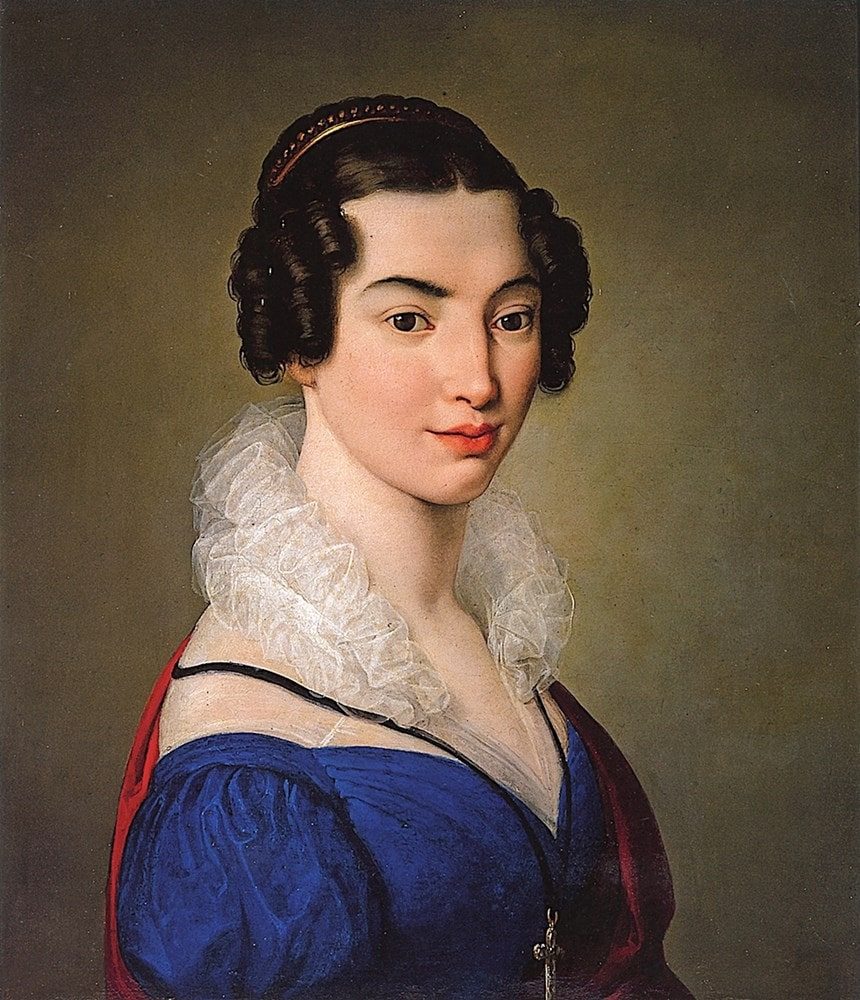
Portrait, Antonietta Vitali Sola (1823)

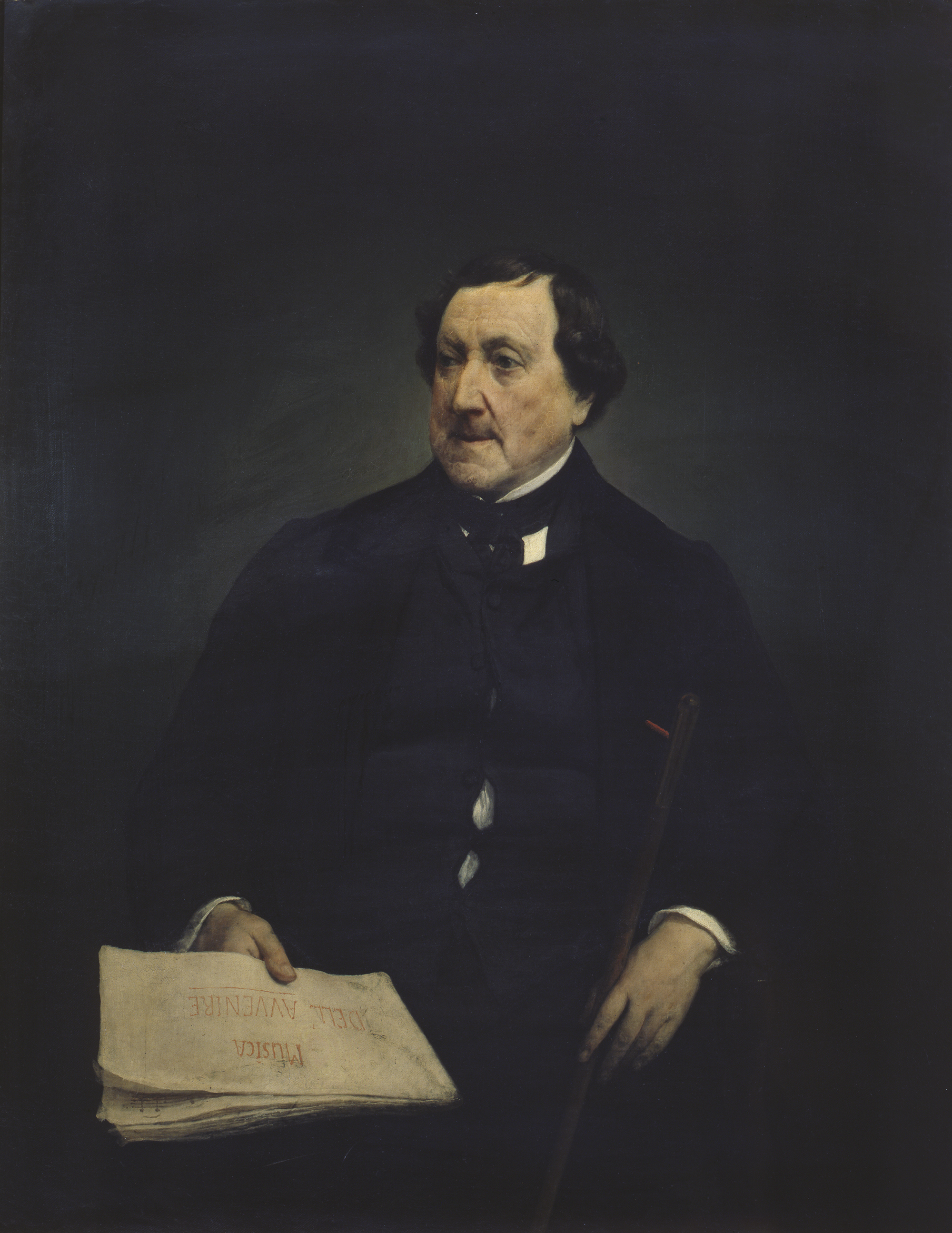
Portrait, Gioacchino Rossini (1870)

Portrait, Camillo Benso, Conte of Cavour (1864)

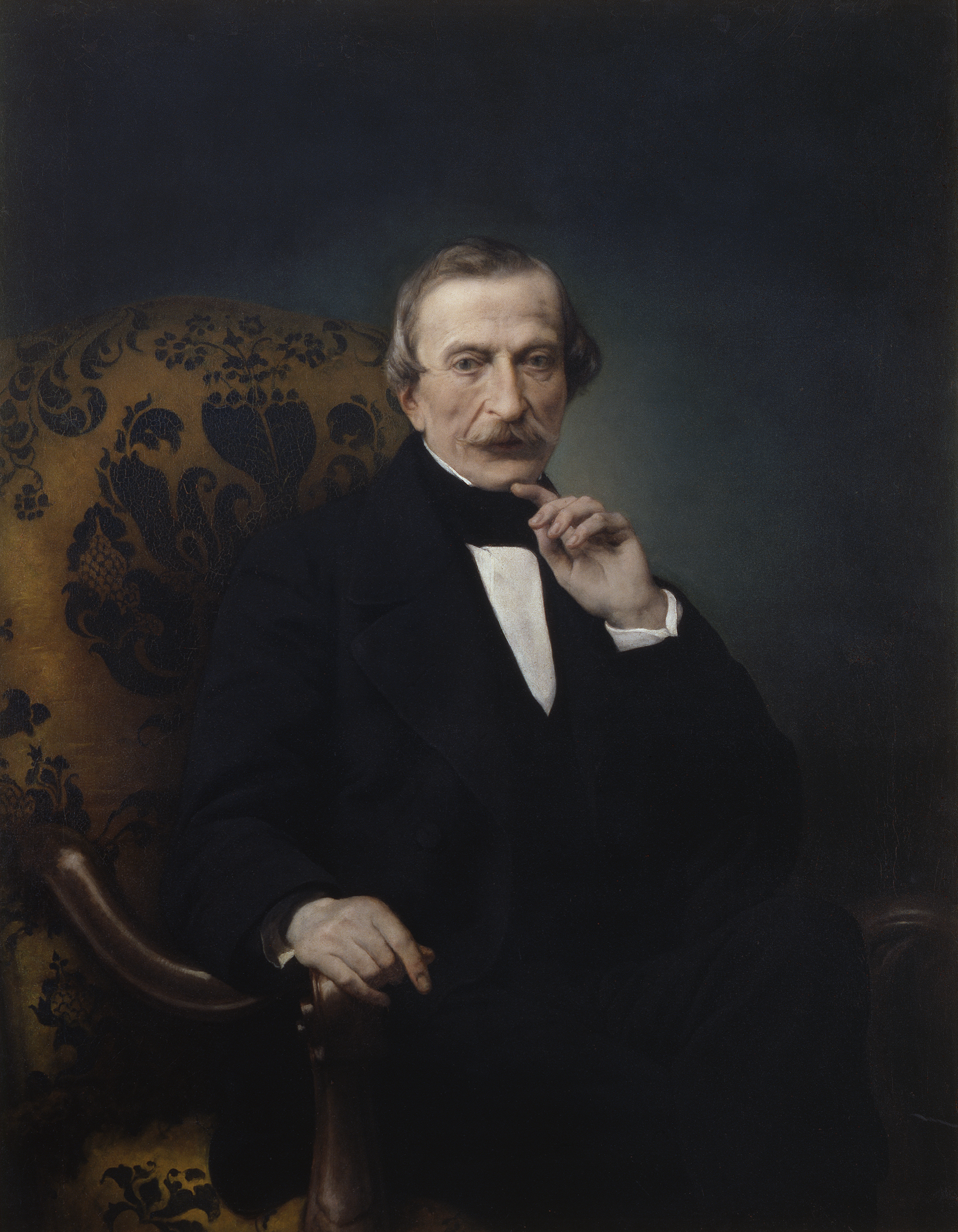
Portrait of Massimo d'Azeglio (1864)

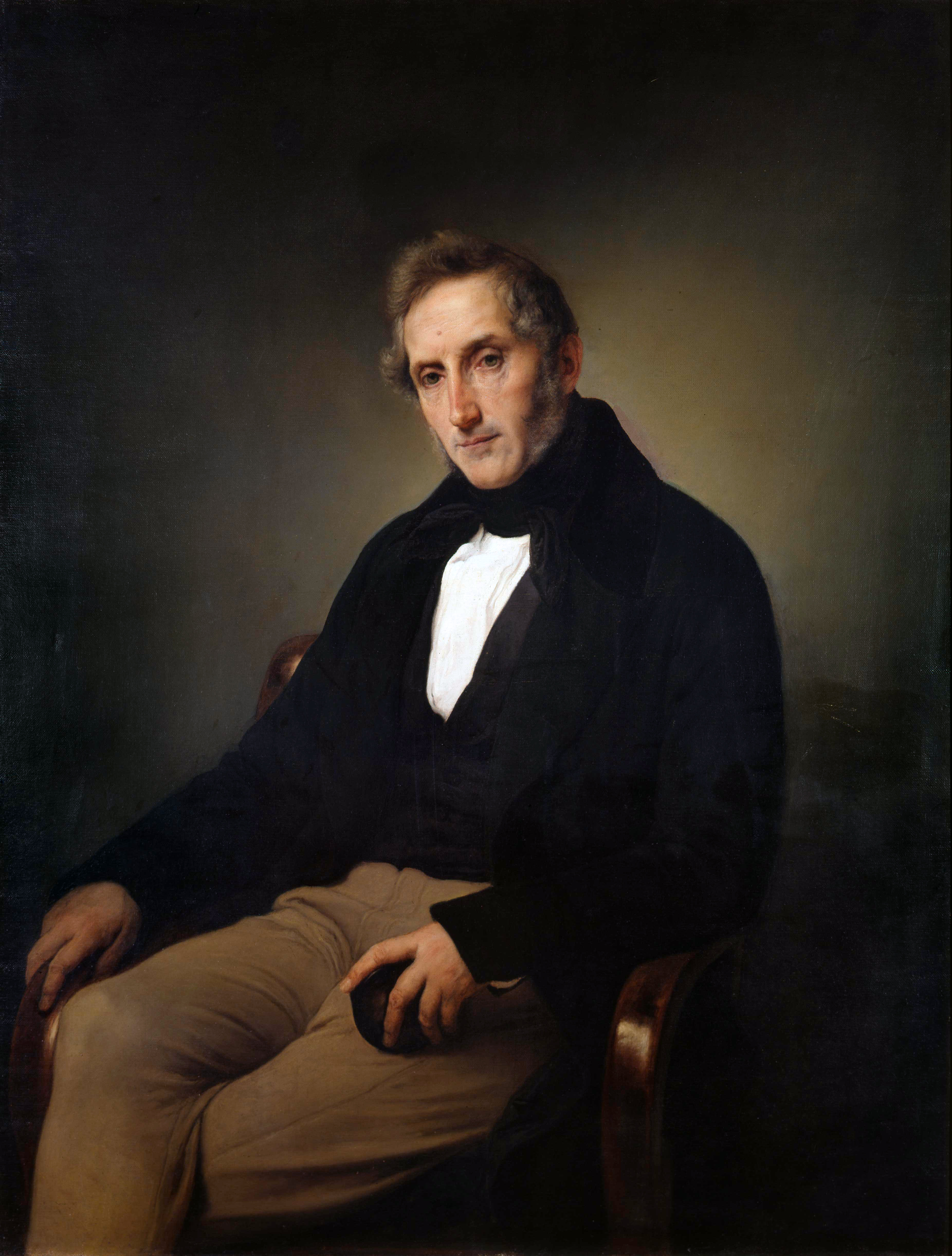
Portrait of Alessandro Manzoni (1841)

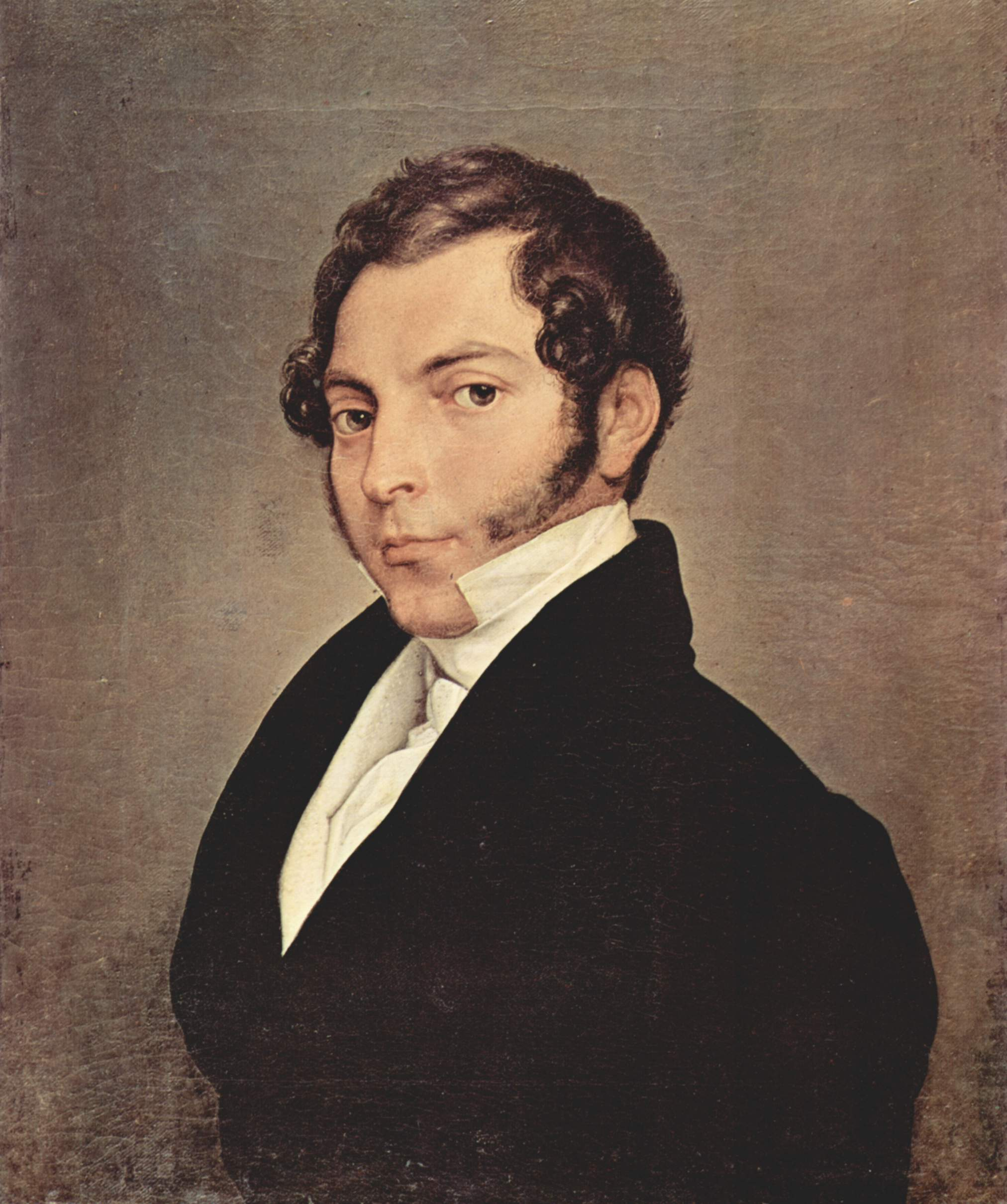
Portrait, Conte Ninni (1823)

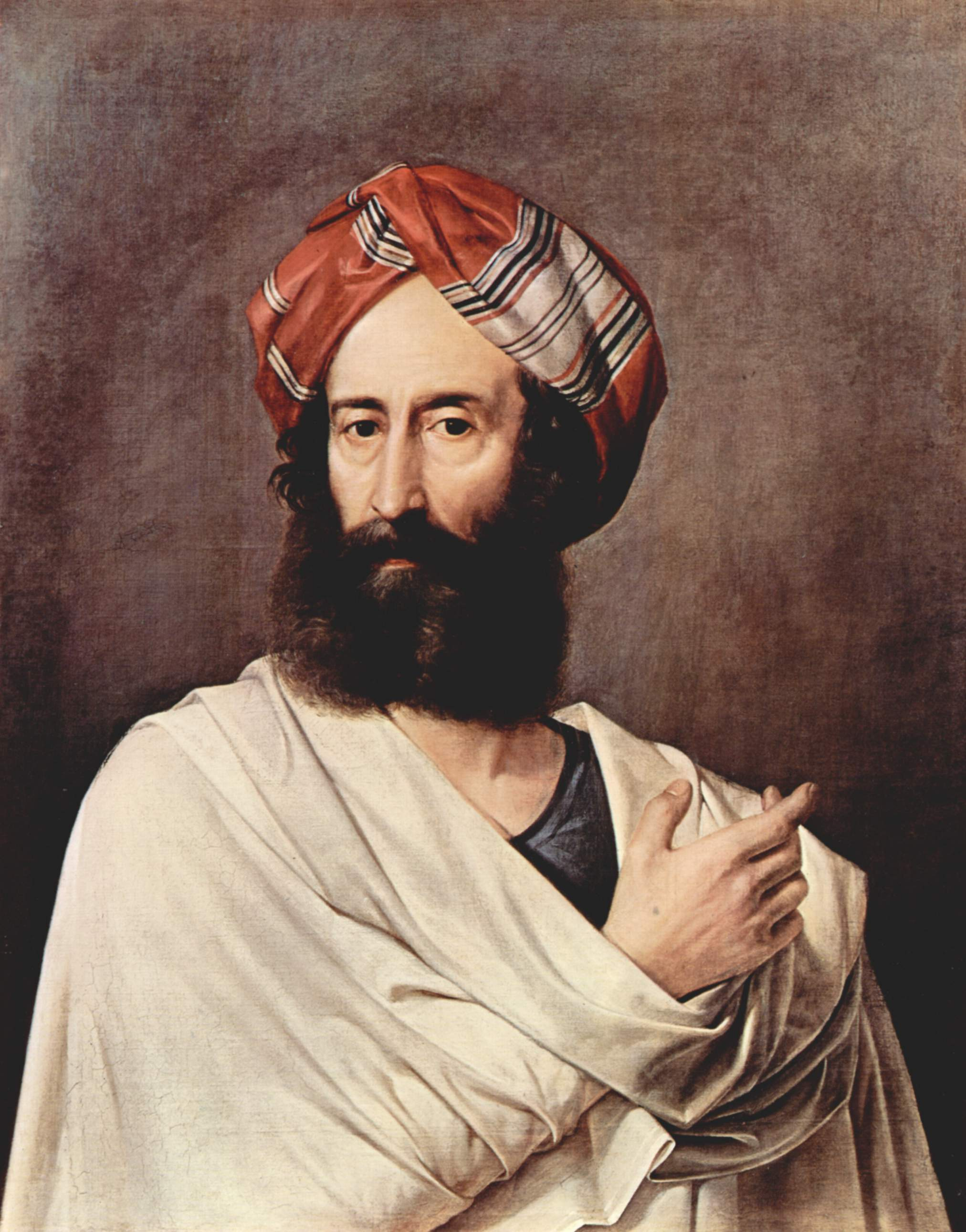
Levite Ephraim (1842–1844)

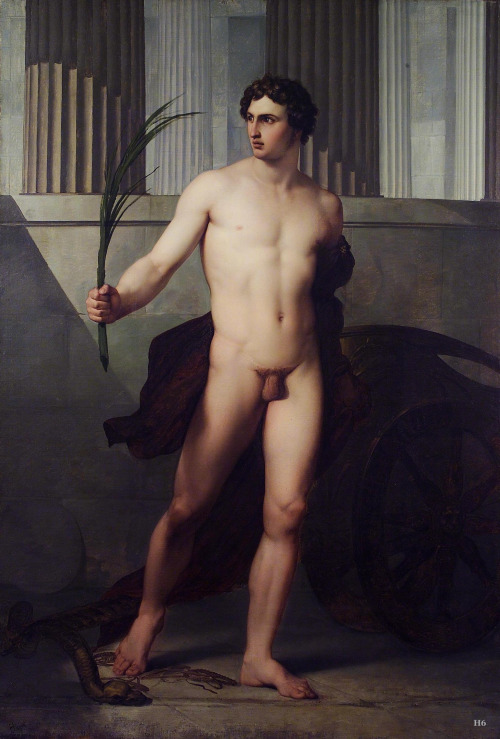
The Victorious Athlete (1813)

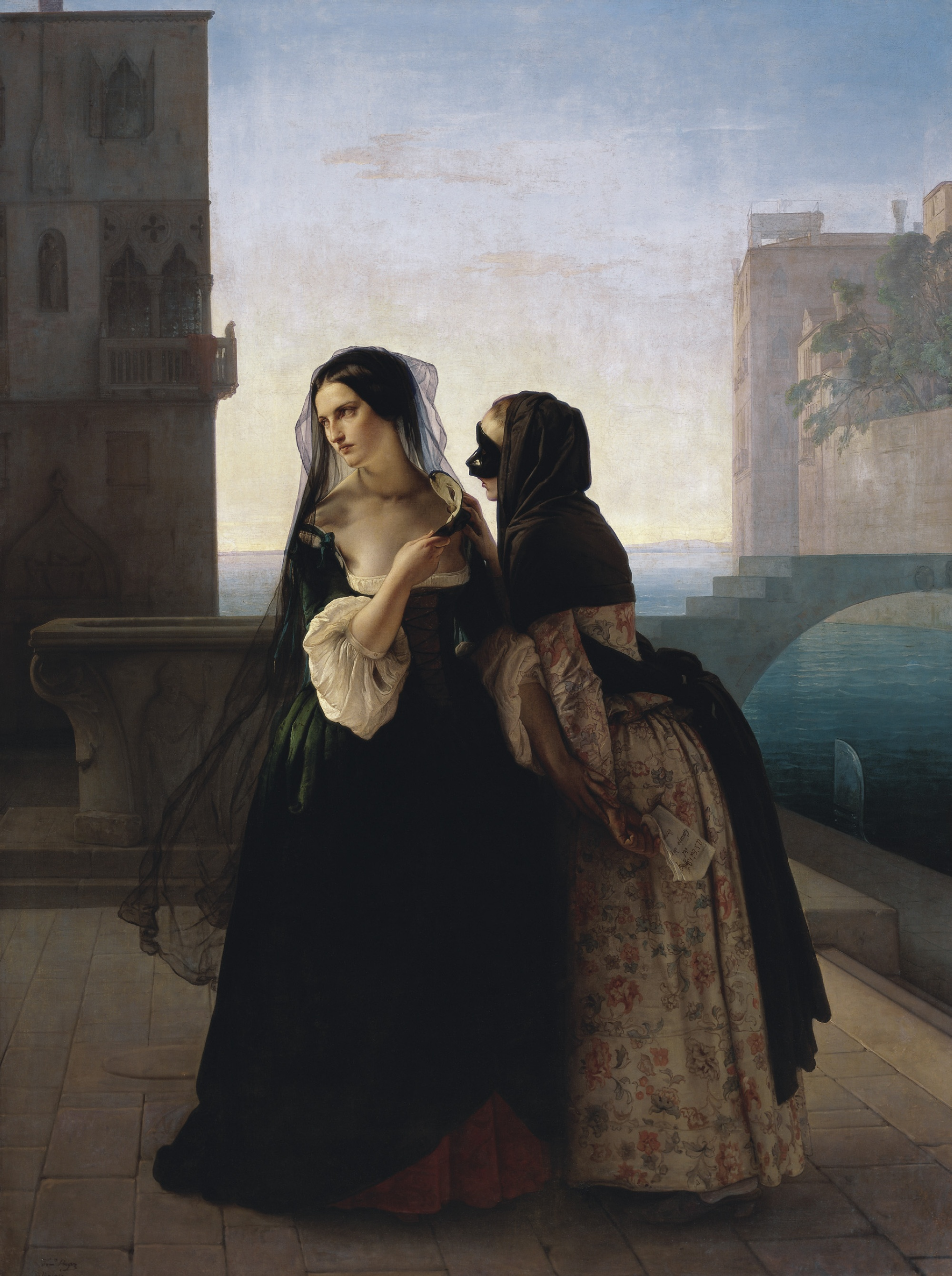
Vengeance is Sworn (1851)

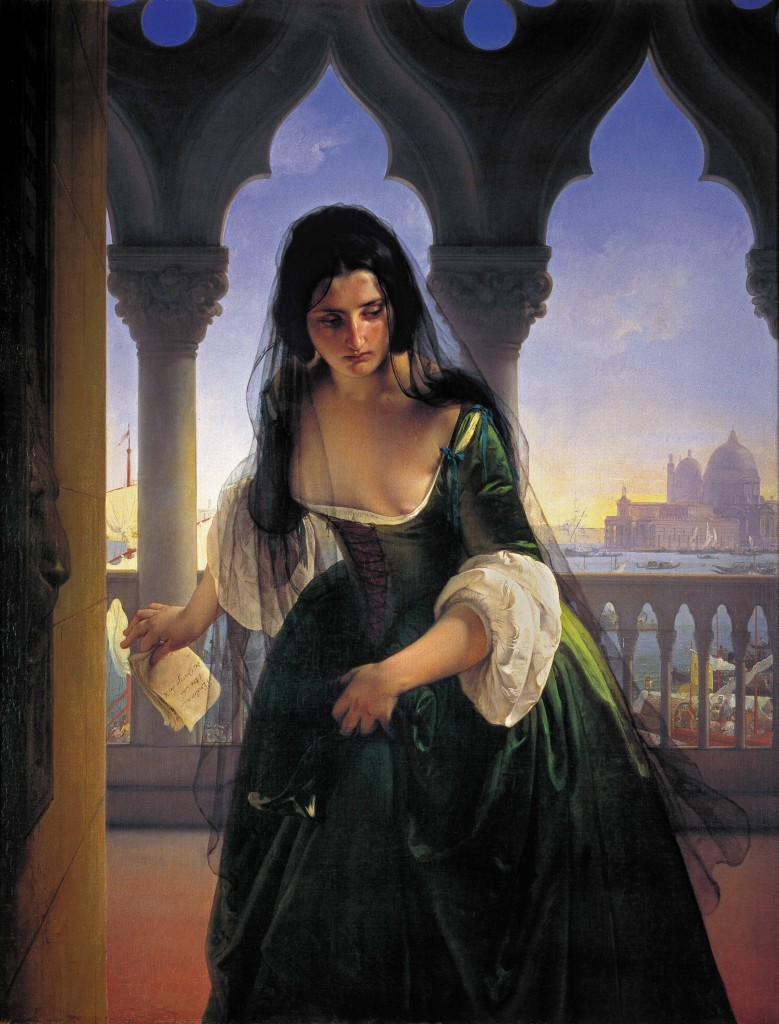
Secret Accusation (1847–1848)

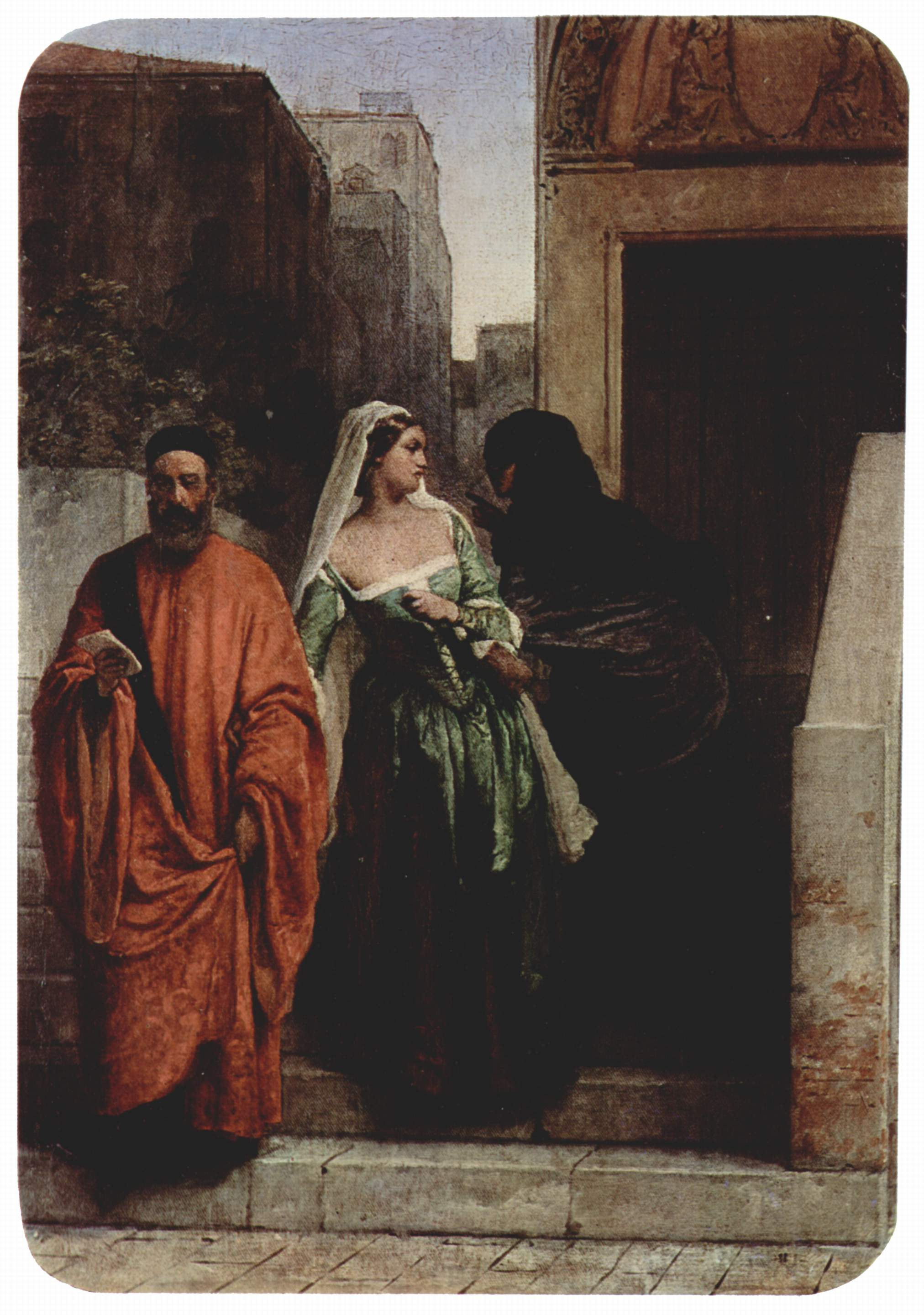
Revenge of a Rival (The Venetian Woman) (1853)

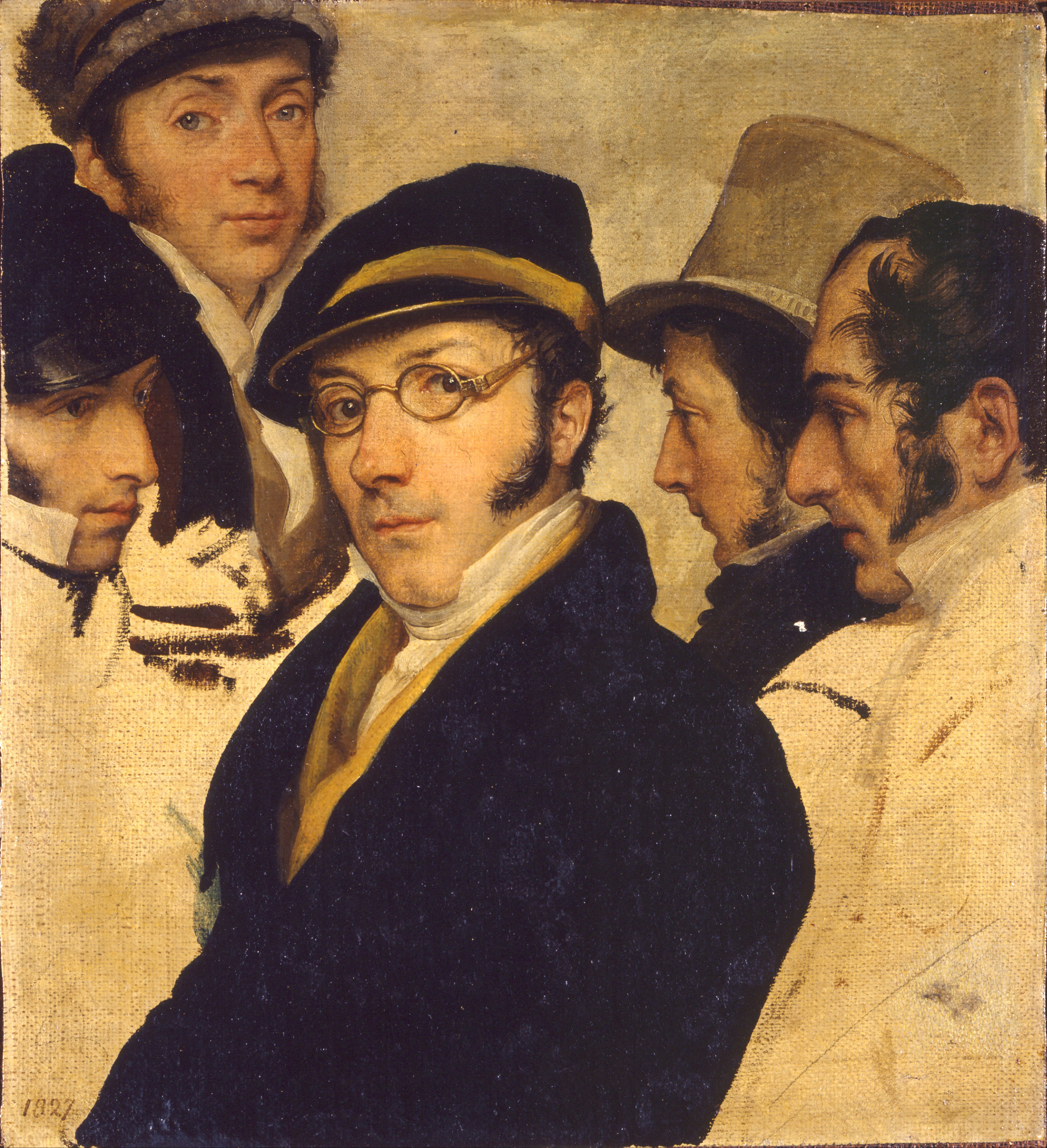
Self-Portrait in a Group of Friends (1824 or 1827). From right to left Tommaso Grossi, Giuseppe Molteni, Giovanni Migliara and Pelagio Palagi

== See also ==
- Christian art
- List of Orientalist artists
- Orientalism
- Romanticism in Italy
- Neo-romanticism
