= Passive-aggressive =

Passive-aggressive may refer to:

== Psychology and psychiatry ==
- Passive-aggressive behavior
- Passive–aggressive personality disorder, a former diagnosis
- Immature personality disorder, a former diagnosis, later called "Passive–aggressive personality disorder"
- A type of Behavioral communication

== Music ==
- Passive Aggressive, a song on Phoenix (Charlotte Cardin album)
- Passive/Aggressive, a song on the eponymous Fun Lovin' Criminals (EP)
- Passive Me, Aggressive You, an album by The Naked and Famous
- Passive Me, Aggressive You (Remixes & B-Sides), an album by The Naked and Famous
- Passive Aggressive, a song on the CD single for Special K (song) by Placebo
- Passive Aggressive: Singles 2002–2010, a compilation album by The Radio Dept.

== Other ==
- Passive-Aggressive Notes, a website
