= Meditation (Hayez) =

Paintings by Francesco Hayez

- La meditazione (Italian)
- Artist: Francesco Hayez
- Year: 1851
- Type: Oil on canvas
- Movement: Romanticism
- Dimensions: 92.5 cm × 71.0 cm (36.4 in × 28.0 in)
- Location: Galleria d'arte moderna Achille Forti, Verona

Meditation (Italian: La meditazione) is a pair of oil paintings on canvas by the Italian artist Francesco Hayez, completed in 1850 and 1851. They both depict a personification of Italy as a young, disheveled woman; the 1850 Meditation debuted as A Meditation on the Old and New Testaments, (Note: Italian: La meditazione sopra l'antico e nuovo Testamento) while the 1851 Meditation was also called Meditation: Italy in 1848, (Note: Italian: La meditazione: L'Italia nel 1848) making its allegorical relationship to the failed 1848 Italian revolutions explicit. Hayez had previously paid homage to the depiction of Italy as a weeping woman, first shown on the grave of Vittorio Alfieri, in his painting Pietro Rossi.

The majority of critical attention has been placed on the 1851 Meditation, which shows the depiction of Italy as more proud and defiant despite her suffering, with stronger symbolism in favor of the Italian Risorgimento. It has been contrasted with Delacroix's Liberty Leading the People, which was a triumphant depiction of a revolutionary action in France, while instead the Meditation is mourning those who died in the Five Days of Milan, symbolized by the dates written in red on the cross in her hand. Initial versions of the painting hid the political symbolism, with the red text identifying the book as the History of Italy and the dates on the cross not being added until sometime after the painting's first public exhibition in 1852. It resides in the collection at the Galleria d'arte moderna Achille Forti in Verona.

== Background ==
Francesco Hayez was born in Venice in 1791 and began his art education in Rome in 1809 as a student of the sculptor Antonio Canova. He was not personally interested in the impact of the Napoleonic Wars on Europe, largely being limited to relief at having avoided conscription. He returned to Venice after the Austrian Empire regained control of Northern Italy, and then moved to Milan in 1820. His 1820 painting Pietro Rossi, likely inspired by his reading of Marc-Antoine Laugier's Histoire de la République de Venise (History of the Republic of Venice), was his first major work drawing from Italy's past in the Middle Ages instead of classicism, and was his first large success. It depicts a medieval Italian lord receiving a summons to take command of the Venetian army, conflicted between his duties and his wife and two daughters who are tearfully begging him not to go. The daughter further to the right was modeled on the personification of Italy weeping on the tomb of Vittorio Alfieri in Santa Croce, Florence.

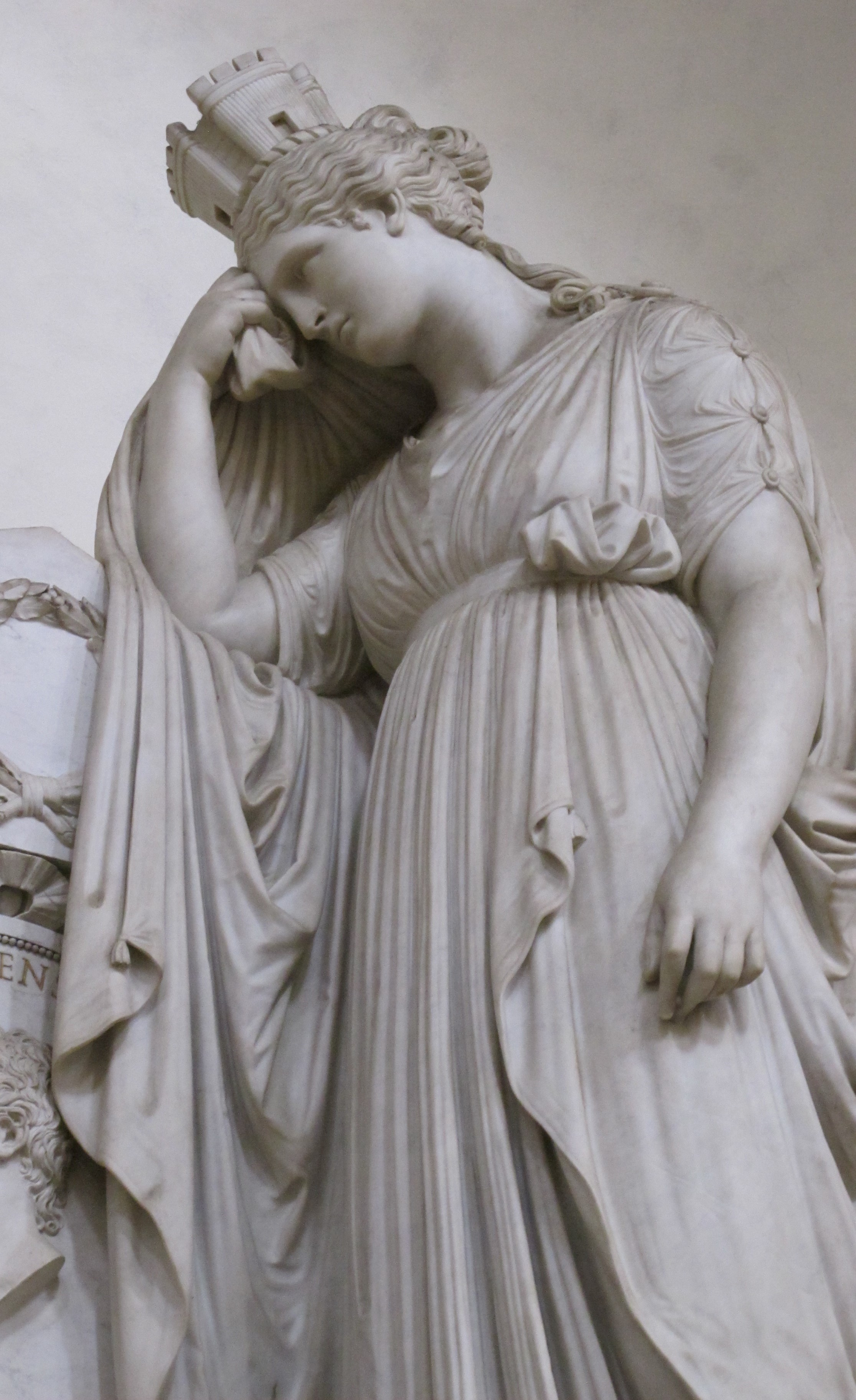
Tomb of Vittorio Alfieri, 1810

Pietro Rossi (fragment), 1820

Hayez returned to the depiction of the personification of Italy in the wake of the failed revolutions of 1848 in the Italian states, with the first version being commissioned by Antonio Maffei, a friend and poet aligned with the Italian liberals. Hayez initially attempted to self-censor the political message of the Meditation; the first version was displayed at the Pinacoteca di Brera in 1850 under the title A Meditation on the Old and New Testaments (La meditazione sopra l'antico e nuovo Testamento), disguising it as a religious work. The second Meditation was commissioned in 1851 by the Veronese Count Giacomo Franco, also sympathetic to Italian liberalism, and the pro-Risorgimento symbolism was made stronger. The second version was later given the subtitle "Italy in 1848" (L'Italia nel 1848).

== Description ==
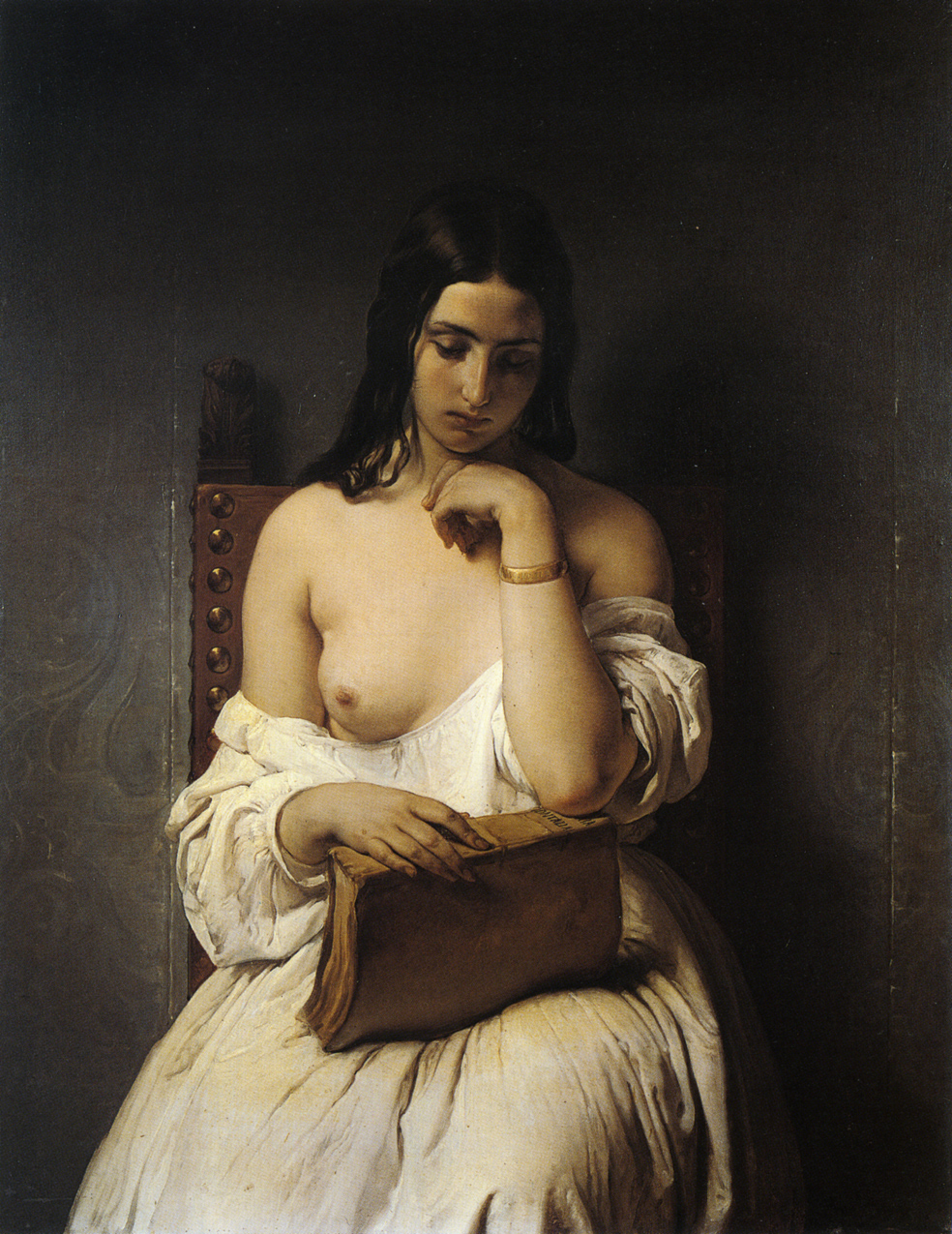
Mediation (1850), Francesco Hayez

Both versions of Meditation depict a young woman sitting in a 16th-century chair wearing a white, disheveled dress with her right breast exposed. The 1850 Meditation depicts her wearing a bracelet on one wrist while making a "thinker" pose, with a book with black lettering on the spine being partially concealed by her hand. Both are considered to be works of Romanticism, which was a style he also had used for several other portraits of women previously, such as the two versions of the painting Melancholy (1840), and the wife in the foreground with one exposed breast in The Sicilian Vespers (1846).

The 1851 Meditation reflects the allegory of Italy after the disaster of the 1848 revolutions more strongly. The bracelet she wore in the first painting is no longer present, and her facial expression has changed from a passive and introspective thinker to an intense and angry look, directly at the viewer. She still holds a book in one hand, this time with red lettering on the spine, reading "Storia d'Ita[lia]" (History of Italy), with the roman numerals XVIIII as the book's volume, for the 19th century. The shadows visible over her face can also be seen as bruises. The other major addition was a crucifix in the other hand, indicating her role as a martyr. The painting was restored in the 1980s, which revealed red text on the cross of "18.19.20.21.22. marzo / 1848", the individual dates of the Five Days of Milan. These dates, along with the red text on the spine of the book, were added after the painting's initial public appearance in Verona in 1852; before, the book appeared to be a Bible. It measures 92.5 centimetres (36.4 in) by 71.0 centimetres (28.0 in).

== Analysis and legacy ==
Liberty Leading the People (1830), Eugène Delacroix

The 1851 Meditation proved to be more impactful and became the best-known variant. Although both paintings depict Italy as a young and vulnerable woman, instead of a maternal figure like other contemporary iconography of Italy, the 1850 Meditation depicts her humiliated, while the other shows her determined, rebellious, and resistant. These two stages themselves correspond with the public reception of Italy to the failed 1848 revolutions. Although wearing a white dress, symbolizing virginity, her disheveled appearance suggests that she had been assaulted, with Hayez saying that "Italy had been raped by foreign powers", according to American art historian Roberta Olson. Meditation proved influential in developing the image of the Italia turrita, providing an example for other contemporary Italian artists depicting her as defeated and oppressed, but still proud and beautiful.

American art critic Michael Prodger wrote that Meditation depicts the opposite of Eugène Delacroix's 1830 painting Liberty Leading the People; the latter shows a bare-breasted depiction of Liberty raising the French flag in triumph, while in contrast the symbol of Italy is sitting and contemplative with regret at failure.

The 1851 painting is located within the Galleria d'arte moderna Achille Forti in Verona, Italy, and the 1850 painting is in a private collection.
