= Self-defeating personality disorder =

Proposed personality disorder

- Other names: Masochistic personality disorder
- Specialty: Psychiatry
- Complications: Dysthymia, major depressive episode
- Usual onset: Early adulthood
- Risk factors: Family history, abuse
- Differential diagnosis: physical, sexual or psychological abuse, major depressive disorder

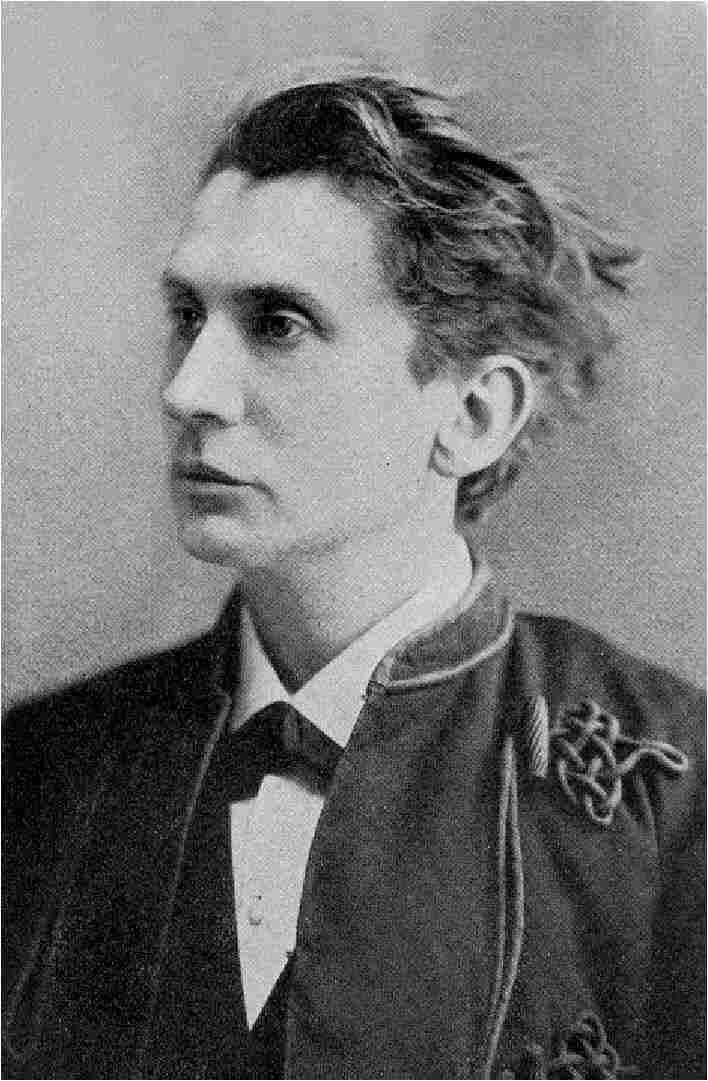
Leopold von Sacher-Masoch (1836-1895) the Austrian writer, whose name the term masochism is derived from.

Self-defeating personality disorder (SDPD), formerly known as masochistic personality disorder, was a proposed personality disorder. As a descriptor for "Other personality disorder" it was included in the DSM-III in 1980. (Note: "Other Personality Disorder should be used when the clinician judges that a specific Personality Disorder not included in this classification is appropriate, such as Masochistic, Impulsive, or Immature Personality Disorder. In such instances the clinician should record the specific Other Personality Disorder, using the 301.89 code.") It was discussed in an appendix of the DSM-III-R in 1987, but was never formally admitted into the manual. The distinction was not seen as clinically valuable because of its significant overlap with other personality disorders (borderline, avoidant and dependent). Both the DSM-III and DSM-III-R separated the condition from sexual masochism.

It was entirely excluded from the DSM-IV. Since the DSM-5, the diagnoses other specified / unspecified personality disorder have mostly replaced its use.

== Diagnosis ==
=== Definition proposed in DSM III-R for further review ===
Self-defeating personality disorder is:

A) A pervasive pattern of self-defeating behavior, beginning by early adulthood and present in a variety of contexts. The person may often avoid or undermine pleasurable experiences, be drawn to situations or relationships in which they will suffer, and prevent others from helping them, as indicated by at least five of the following:

1. chooses people and situations that lead to disappointment, failure, or mistreatment even when better options are clearly available
2. rejects or renders ineffective the attempts of others to help them
3. following positive personal events (e.g., new achievement), responds with depression, guilt, or a behavior that produces pain (e.g., an accident)
4. incites angry or rejecting responses from others and then feels hurt, defeated, or humiliated (e.g., makes fun of spouse in public, provoking an angry retort, then feels devastated)
5. rejects opportunities for pleasure, or is reluctant to acknowledge enjoying themselves (despite having adequate social skills and the capacity for pleasure)
6. fails to accomplish tasks crucial to their personal objectives despite having demonstrated ability to do so (e.g., helps fellow students write papers, but is unable to write their own)
7. is uninterested in or rejects people who consistently treat them well
8. engages in excessive self-sacrifice that is unsolicited by the intended recipients of the sacrifice

B) The behaviors in A do not occur exclusively in response to, or in anticipation of, being physically, sexually, or psychologically abused.

C) The behaviors in A do not occur only when the person is depressed.

=== AMPD ===
The alternative DSM-5 model for personality disorders does not include SDPD; however, it can be diagnosed as Personality Disorder–Trait Specified.

=== Millon's subtypes ===
Theodore Millon has proposed four subtypes of masochist. Any individual masochist may fit into none, one or more of the following subtypes:

Subtype	Features	Traits
Virtuous masochist	Including histrionic features	Proudly unselfish, self-denying, and self-sacrificial; self-ascetic; weighty burdens are judged noble, righteous, and saintly; others must recognize loyalty and faithfulness; gratitude and appreciation expected for altruism and forbearance.
Possessive masochist	Including negativistic features	Bewitches and ensnares by becoming jealous, overprotective, and indispensable; entraps, takes control, conquers, enslaves, and dominates others by being sacrificial to a fault; control by obligatory dependence.
Self-undoing masochist	Including avoidant features	Is "wrecked by success"; experiences "victory through defeat"; gratified by personal misfortunes, failures, humiliations, and ordeals; eschews best interests; chooses to be victimized, ruined, disgraced.
Oppressed masochist	Including depressive features	Experiences genuine misery, despair, hardship, anguish, torment, illness; grievances used to create guilt in others; resentments vented by exempting from responsibilities and burdening "oppressors".

== History ==
Originally proposed as masochistic personality disorder, the proposal was characterized by maladaptive focus on negative features and circumstances, as well as remaining in an exploitative or abusive relationship despite opportunities to alter the situation. Controversy arose due to the perceived mischaracterization of traumatic responses to imprisonment and domestic violence as a pathological disorder. The behavior of intimate partner violence victims has been found to be warped by the circumstances of basic survival they find themselves in, causing seemingly unreasonable behavior that does not address a long-term effort towards escape, caused by a reduction or lack of long-term thinking in the victim. Through the outcry of women's groups, the diagnosis was modified to self-defeating personality disorder, the criteria of diagnosis modified to exclude abuse, and added to an appendix of the DSM-III. It was excluded from the DSM-IV and further editions.

Self-defeating personality disorder has been considered to have significant overlap with several other personality disorders since the time of its proposal, and the disorder has been found to lack the reasons for an additional diagnosis. The concept of self-hatred as a psychological construct, building from multiple disorders including the ideas of self-defeating personality disorder, has been explored as "Malignant Self Regard".

== See also ==
- Sadistic personality disorder
- Self-handicapping
- Self-preservation
- Setting up to fail
- Autosadism
- Algolagnia
- Learned helplessness
- Hedonophobia
