= Depressive personality disorder =

Personality disorder involving depression

- Other names: Melancholic personality disorder
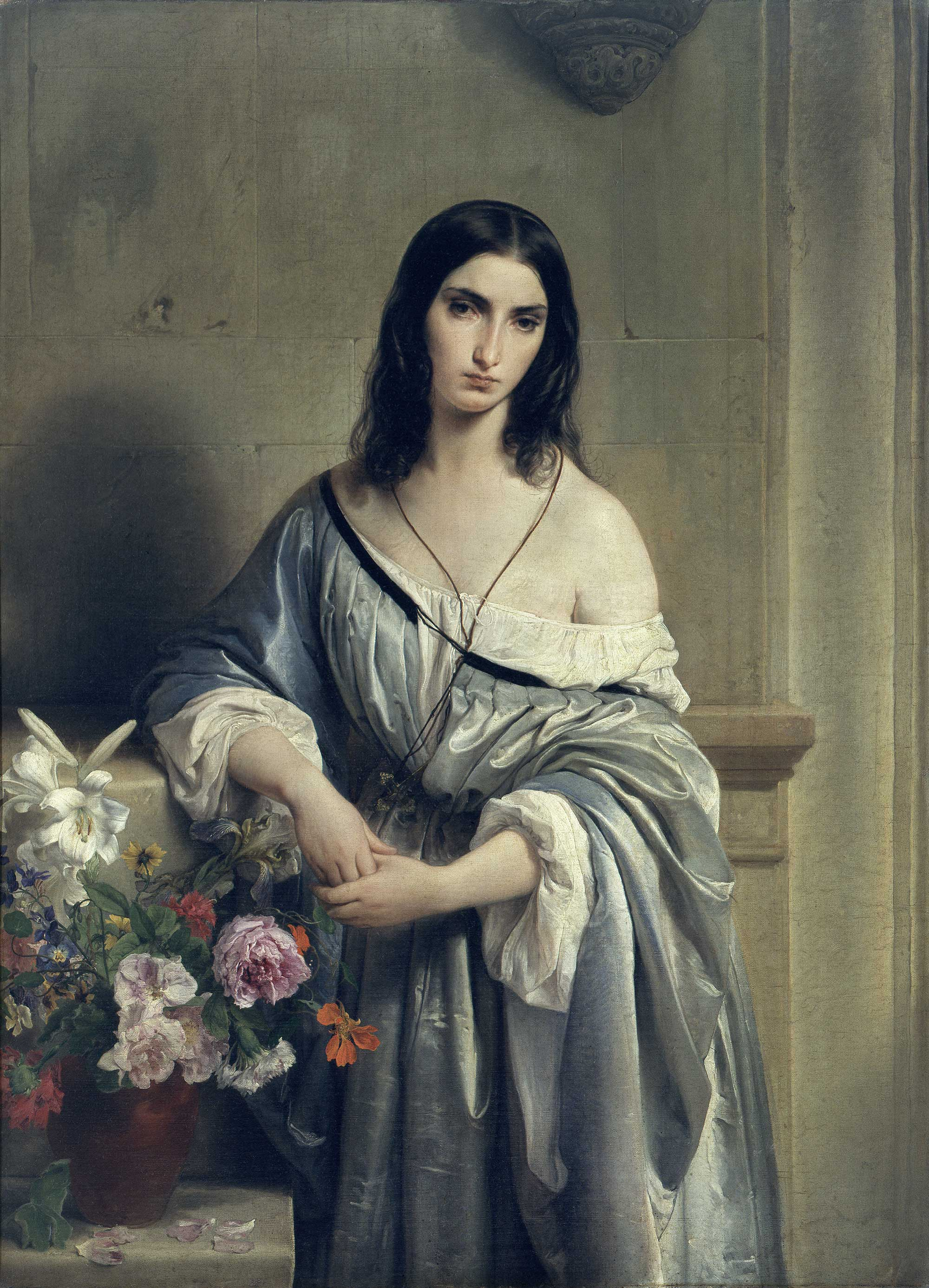
- Melancholy, painting by Francesco Hayez
- Specialty: Psychiatry
- Symptoms: Low self-esteem, primarily negative mood, frequently critical towards oneself and others, pessimism, excessive feelings of guilt or remorse
- Duration: Long term
- Differential diagnosis: Mood disorder (e.g., dysthymia, major depressive disorder, bipolar disorder), avoidant personality disorder

Depressive personality disorder, also known as melancholic personality disorder, is a former psychiatric diagnosis that denotes a personality disorder with depressive features.

Originally included in the American Psychiatric Association's DSM-II,, depressive personality disorder was removed from the DSM-III and DSM-III-R. The latest description of depressive personality disorder is described in Appendix B in the DSM-IV-TR. Although no longer listed as a personality disorder in the DSM-5, the diagnosis of subclinical Other Specified Personality Disorder and Unspecified Personality Disorder can be used instead.

While depressive personality disorder shares some similarities with mood disorders such as dysthymia, it also shares many similarities with other personality disorders including avoidant personality disorder. Some researchers argue that depressive personality disorder is sufficiently distinct from these other conditions so as to warrant a separate diagnosis.

== Characteristics ==
The DSM-IV defines depressive personality disorder as "a pervasive pattern of depressive cognitions and behaviors beginning by early adulthood and occurring in a variety of contexts." Depressive personality disorder occurs independently of major depressive episodes, making it a distinct diagnosis not included in the definition of either major depressive episodes or dysthymia.

Five or more of the following criteria must be present:

- usual mood is dominated by dejection, gloominess, cheerlessness, joylessness and unhappiness
- self-concept centers on beliefs of inadequacy, worthlessness, and low self-esteem
- critical, blaming, and derogatory towards self
- brooding and given to worry
- negativistic, critical and judgmental toward others
- pessimistic
- prone to feeling guilty or remorseful

Studies in 2000-2002 have found more of a correlation between depressive personality disorder and dysthymia than a comparable group of people without depressive personality disorder.

== Millon's subtypes ==
Theodore Millon identified five subtypes of depression. Any individual depressive may exhibit none, or one or more of the following:

Subtype	Features	Traits
Ill-humored depressive	Including negativistic features	Patients in this subtype are often hypochondriacal, cantankerous and irritable, and guilt-ridden and self-condemning. In general, ill-humored depressives are down on themselves and think the worst of everything.
Self-derogating depressive	Including dependent features	Patients who fall under this subtype are self-deriding, discrediting, odious, dishonorable, and disparage themselves for weaknesses and shortcomings. These patients blame themselves for not being good enough.
Morbid depressive	Including schizoid and masochistic features	Morbid depressives experience profound dejection and gloom, are highly lugubrious, and often feel drained and oppressed.
Restive depressive	Including avoidant features	Patients who fall under this subtype are consistently unsettled, agitated, wrought in despair, and perturbed. This is the subtype most likely to commit suicide in order to avoid all the despair in life.
Voguish depressive	Including histrionic and narcissistic features	Patients who fall under this subtype embrace their suffering as ennobling. They view their personal depression as self-glorifying and dignifying; their unhappiness as a stylish expression of social disenchantment.

Not all patients with a depressive disorder fall into a subtype. These subtypes are multidimensional in that patients usually experience multiple subtypes, instead of being limited to fitting into one subtype category. Currently, this set of subtypes is associated with melancholic personality disorders. All depression spectrum personality disorders are melancholic and can be looked at in terms of these subtypes.

== Differential diagnosis ==
=== Similarities to dysthymia ===
Much of the controversy surrounding the potential inclusion of depressive personality disorder in the DSM-5 stems from its apparent similarities to dysthymia, a diagnosis already included in the DSM-IV. Dysthymia is characterized by a variety of depressive symptoms such as hypersomnia, fatigue, low self-esteem, poor appetite, or difficulty making decisions, for over two years, with symptoms never numerous or severe enough to qualify as major depressive disorder. Patients with dysthymia may experience social withdrawal, pessimism, and feelings of inadequacy at higher rates than other patients with depression. Early-onset dysthymia is the diagnosis most closely related to depressive personality disorder.

The key difference between dysthymia and depressive personality disorder is the focus of the symptoms used to diagnose. Dysthymia is diagnosed by looking at the somatic senses, the more tangible senses. Depressive personality disorder is diagnosed by looking at the cognitive and intrapsychic symptoms. The symptoms of dysthymia and depressive personality disorder may look similar at first glance, but the way these symptoms are considered distinguish the two diagnoses.

=== Comorbidity with other disorders ===
Many researchers believe that depressive personality disorder is so highly comorbid with other depressive disorders, manic-depressive episodes, and dysthymia, that it is redundant to include it as a distinct diagnosis. Recent studies however, have found that dysthymia and depressive personality disorder are not as comorbid as previously thought. It was found that almost two thirds of the test subjects with depressive personality disorder did not have dysthymia, and 83% did not have early-onset dysthymia.

The comorbidity with Axis I depressive disorders is not as high as had been assumed. An experiment conducted by American psychologists showed that depressive personality disorder shows a high comorbidity rate with major depression experienced at some point in a lifetime and with any mood disorders experienced at any point in a lifetime. A high comorbidity rate with these disorders is expected of many diagnoses. As for the extremely high comorbidity rate with mood disorders, it has been found that essentially all mood disorders are comorbid with at least one other, especially when looking at a lifetime sample size.
