= Oulu child murders =

Serial murder case in Finland

Kaisa Vornanen-Karaduman
- Born: Kaisa Emilia Vornanen; 1979 (age 46–47); Finland
- Conviction: Manslaughter x5
- Penalty: 13 years imprisonment

Details
- Victims: 5
- Span of crimes: 2005–2013
- Country: Finland
- State: North Ostrobothnia
- Date apprehended: 3 June 2014

The Oulu child murders is a Finnish murder case, referring to the discovery of the bodies of five infants in the basement of an apartment building in Oulu, on 3 June 2014. The mother of the babies, 35-year-old Kaisa Emilia Vornanen-Karaduman, had concealed the pregnancies and abandoned them, after giving birth at home. The Rovaniemi Court of Appeal sentenced her to 13 years imprisonment for five counts of manslaughter, but not for concealing a corpse. According to District Prosecutor Sari Kemppainen, who was the lead prosecutor for the case, there have been no similar cases in Finnish criminal history.

== Discovery ==
On 3 June 2014, Oulu police received a complaint about some foul-smelling packages found in the basement storage of an apartment block in the centre. When examined, the packages were found to contain the bodies of five infants.

The 35-year-old mother of these children, Kaisa Emilia Vornanen-Karaduman (b. 1979), was arrested and detained on suspicion of manslaughter and concealment of a corpse. During interrogation, the charges were increased to five homicides. The woman claimed that she had given birth at home, and preserved the bodies after death in a freezer. She could not explain the motive for her actions, and denied deliberately killing them. As the latest apartment did not have a freezer, the bodies had been put in a basement storage.

The preliminary investigation determined that the children were born in the years 2005, 2007, at the turn of the year 2011–2012, 2012 and 2013. They were born in apartments on Rommakkokatu and Peltokatu streets. The causes of death could not be determined, because the bodies had been severely degraded by then. According to the prosecutor later at trial, Vornanen-Karaduman had usually given birth in the bathroom or toilet, wrapped the babies up in plastic bags, put them in a bucket, closed it and then took it to the basement. In two instances, she claimed to have used a sauna bucket and a shoe box instead of a normal bucket. According to the prosecutor, the woman had left the children without any care or assistance after they were born.

During the examinations, 28 people were interviewed as witnesses, including relatives, colleagues and acquaintances. Vornanen-Karaduman had hidden her pregnancies from the others, with loose clothing. Her relatives knew about one pregnancy, that the woman claimed had ended in a miscarriage. A former boss of Vornanen-Karaduman suspected that she was pregnant at one time, but she had explained to her manager that her stomach was rounded as a result of all the greasy pizzas that she had eaten the previous night. Vornanen-Karadumanen's father described his daughter as a pathological liar.

Vornanen-Karaduman's lawyer stated in his final statement in the district court hearing that his client was pregnant, yet again, during the summer of 2014, when she was arrested by police. This pregnancy, however, was terminated at her own request.

== Murders ==
Child 1, exhibit 485/13, Police forensic sample number 6, born August 2013

On autopsy, the child was found concealed in a shoebox and a plastic bag.

In a police interview in 13.06.2014, Vornanen-Karaduman stated that she gave birth to the child in the Peltokatu apartment in Oulu in 2013. She gave birth unassisted in the bathtub. She stated that the child was born lifeless, and she had then delivered the placenta and cut the umbilical cord with scissors. Vornanen-Karaduman claimed that she had attempted to restore signs of life but was unsuccessful.

Some time after the birth, she packed the body of the child into a shoebox, and then took the shoebox out onto the balcony. According to DNA analysis, the child was a girl, and her mother was confirmed to be Kaisa Vornanen-Karaduman. Paternity is known but retracted from publicly available court documents.

Child 2, exhibit 486/14, Police forensic sample number 7, born December 2010 ^{(disputed, may have been mixed up with Child 4)}

On autopsy, the child was found concealed in a lime green bucket and a plastic bag.

Vornanen-Karaduman stated that she gave birth to the child in the Peltokatu apartment in Oulu in 2010. She stated that she filled the bathtub with water, entered, and lost consciousness after the start of labour. When she regained consciousness, she claimed to have found the child floating in the tub, underwater. The child was lifeless. She then concealed the body in a bucket and a plastic bag.

On DNA analysis, the child was found to be a girl, and her mother was confirmed to be Kaisa Vornanen-Karaduman. Paternity is undetermined.

According to investigators, it is likely that Vornanen-Karaduman confused two of the concealed bodies with each other, which would mean that this child was more likely to have been born in 2007, and Child 4 was the child born in 2010.

Child 3, exhibit 487/14, Police forensic sample number 8, born May 2005

On autopsy, the child was found concealed in a light green bucket.

Vornanen-Karaduman claimed to have given birth to the child in the Rommakkokatu apartment in Oulu in 2005. She entered the bathroom and the child was born on the bathroom floor. The child was cyanosed and lifeless, and was left on the floor for two hours, after which Vornanen-Karaduman placed the body in a bucket, and then closed the lid.

According to DNA analysis, the child was a boy and the mother was confirmed to be Kaisa Vornanen-Karaduman. The paternity of the child is unclear.

Child 4, exhibit 488/14, Police forensic sample number 9, born February 2007 ^{(disputed, may have been mixed up with Child 2)}

On autopsy, the child was found concealed in a blue bucket and an IKEA bag.

Vornanen-Karaduman told the police that she gave birth to the child in the Rommakkokatu apartment in Oulu in 2007. The child was born on the bathroom floor and was lifeless. Afterwards, Vornanen-Karaduman concealed the body in a blue bucket and took it into the basement.

According to DNA analysis, the child was a girl. Her mother was confirmed to be Kaisa Vornanen-Karaduman. Paternity is known but redacted from available court documents.

The investigators believe that Vornanen-Karaduman confused the concealed bodies with each other, so this child was more likely born in December 2010. If this is the case, Child 2 was born in 2007 instead.

Child 5, exhibit 489/14, Police forensic sample number 10, born August 2012

On autopsy, the child was found concealed in a löylykiulu, a type of bucket found in saunas, which was in a suitcase.

Vornanen-Karaduman stated that she gave birth to the child in the Peltokatu apartment in Oulu in 2012. She gave birth in the bathtub, and then did not touch the child for over an hour before concealing the body in the bucket and a plastic bag. Later, the body began to smell, and Vornanen-Karaduman concealed the bucket in a suitcase, which she attempted to make airtight with tape.

According to DNA analysis, the child was a boy. His mother was confirmed to be Kaisa Vornanen-Karaduman. The paternity is known, but redacted from available court documents.

== Trial and imprisonment ==
The Oulu District Court handled the case in a matter of four days in December 2014. Vornanen-Karaduman was charged with five murders and five counts of concealing a corpse. She denied all charges and insisted on her innocence. However, if found guilty, she claimed that it would at most be negligent homicide or aggravated death. Vornanen-Karaduman said that for every baby she gave birth to, she felt lifeless, because they did not move or cry. According to her, it was only later did she learn that the babies had been alive.

The district court found that Vornanen-Karaduman acted deliberately in the deaths of her babies, and she was ordered to undergo a psychiatric assessment. The results were revealed on 1 June 2015, and Vornanen-Karaduman was concluded to be criminally responsible for the acts, though she had a mixed personality disorder.

On 15 June, the District Court sentenced Kaisa Vornanen-Karaduman to life imprisonment for five murders and five counts of concealing a corpse. According to the law, the repetition of the acts almost identically, in five separate instances, showed that the acts had been planned out.

In June 2016, the Rovaniemi Court of Appeal reduced Vornanen-Karaduman's sentence to 13 years imprisonment for five counts of manslaughter.
