= Lamebook =

Internet website

- Website type: Blog (user-generated)
- Owners: Jonathan Standefer, Matthew Genitempo
- Creators: Jonathan Standefer, Matthew Genitempo
- Revenue: Advertising
- Website: Lamebook
- Commercial: Yes
- Registration: Yes
- Launched: April 2009
- Current status: Active

Lamebook is a blog that re-posts 'everything lame and funny' from the social networking site Facebook. Users send in screenshots of unusual or amusing Facebook posts, which are re-posted on the site every weekday.

== History ==
Jonathan Standefer and Matthew Genitempo, graphic designers from Austin, Texas, launched the web site in April 2009 as a Facebook parody site.

The two were acquaintances at Baylor University, yet became friends after they graduated in 2005. "We started Lamebook a little [after meeting], and after a few months of doing that it got so popular that we were able to quit our jobs at the offices and do that full time," said Genitempo, who graduated in 2007 with a degree in graphic design. "That brought a lot of other different design opportunities for both of us."

== Privacy ==
Last names and faces are usually blurred out or pixellated upon upload to avoid invasion of privacy, and content can be removed on request. Lamebook also discourages users from trying to contact people seen in posts.

== Oversharing ==
Sites such as Lamebook would not be in existence without the concept of oversharing. "Overshare", the Word of the Year in 2008 at Webster's New World College Dictionary, is defined as too much information that is either intentionally or accidentally revealed. The editors of Webster's New World explain that this is a new word for an old phenomenon that has been made much easier by the emergence of modern technology. This ease, combined with the wide reach that many social networking sites allow users to have, has made oversharing quite a common occurrence today. According to the Huffington Post, of online oversharers, 32% say that they have experienced "poster’s remorse" and regretted posting certain information about themselves. Lamebook cocreator Jonathan Standefer, was quoted saying "People overshare on the Internet. My favorite ones used to be the mushy ones, but the fights are the funniest. It's like fighting drunk with one of your friends, but everyone else is in the room." He views Lamebook as a forum where people can vent about the inappropriate and cringe-worthy things they have inevitably seen on Facebook. Glamour magazine described Facebook as, "a personal confession booth where we air our dirty laundry". While sitting behind a computer screen, people often forget that "everyone else is in the room," and that on Facebook, anything posted outside of a private message will be seen by many more people than just the one being communicated with. This leads to the kinds of content people submit to Lamebook: couple fights, inappropriate pictures, embarrassing statuses, etc.

== Facebook legal action ==
In March 2010, Facebook contacted Lamebook alleging that the website infringed and diluted the Facebook trademark, and requested that Lamebook cease and desist using the lamebook mark and change the name and look of its website. On 4 November 2010 Lamebook filed legal action against Facebook, seeking a declaration that the website does not infringe the rights of Facebook, and protection as a parody under the First Amendment. In response, on 11 November Facebook sued Lamebook for trademark infringement, claiming the site was not a parody as it does not "provide any critique or comment of Facebook itself".

As of 22 November 2010, Facebook confirmed they had deleted Lamebook's fan page, blocked the 'like' function on Lamebook that was powered by Facebook, and blocked Facebook users from being able to type the word "Lamebook" on Facebook. Facebook CTO Bret Taylor later conceded: "This was a mistake on our part. In the process of dealing with a routine trademark violation issue regarding some links posted to Facebook, we blocked all mentions of the phrase “lamebook” on Facebook. We are committed to promoting free expression on Facebook. We apologize for our mistake in this case, and we are working to fix the process that led to this happening."

Conor Civins, one of Lamebook's lawyers, said, "[Lamebook] is a parody website; it's supposed to be social commentary, and it's protected by free speech." On Lamebook's website during the litigation process, a banner asking viewers for support in their efforts against Facebook read, "We really love running Lamebook. Aside from the laughs, it represents an opportunity to work on an incredibly fun project with our buddies that makes a lot of people happy and still allows us to make rent at the end of the month … Problem is, Facebook didn’t get the joke. They’ve decided to pick on the little guys: small business owners who seem to be no match for a multi-billion dollar behemoth. But this is one website that’s not going down without a fight."

This dispute came to an end when Facebook's efforts to relocate the litigation process from Austin, Texas, to Palo Alto, California were denied by a Texas federal judge. In a joint statement released on 25 August 2011, the companies proclaimed, "We are pleased to arrive at an agreement that protects Facebook's brand and trademark and allows for Lamebook's continued operation. The parties are now satisfied that users are not likely to be confused." Thus forth, Lamebook is permitted to continue under its name, yet must add a disclaimer to its website, which reads, "This is an unofficial parody and is not affiliated or associated with, or endorsed or approved by, Facebook." Lamebook is also not allowed to seek trademark protection for its name.

== See also ==
- Fail blog
- Passive-aggressive Notes
- Regretsy
