= Sexual masochism disorder =

Mental disorder involving sexual arousal from enduring pain, suffering, or humiliation

According to some classification systems, sexual masochism disorder is the condition of experiencing recurring and intense sexual arousal in response to enduring extreme pain, suffering, or humiliation. The Diagnostic and Statistical Manual (DSM-5) of the American Psychiatric Association indicates that a person may have a masochistic sexual interest but that the diagnosis of sexual masochism disorder would only apply to individuals who also report psychosocial difficulties because of it.

While the diagnosis is in the current version of the DSM, the current version of the WHO's classification manual, ICD-11, has entirely removed masochism as a classification for a mental disorder.

== Related terms and conditions ==
=== Current terminology ===
Sexual masochism disorder is the term employed by the current version of the Diagnostic and Statistical Manual (DSM-5) of the American Psychiatric Association. It refers to the "recurrent and intense sexual arousal from the act of being humiliated, beaten, bound, or otherwise made to suffer, as manifested by fantasies, urges, or behaviors" (p. 694). It is classified as one of the paraphilias, called an algolagnic disorder (p. 685), which is one of the "anomalous activity preferences" (p. 685). The formal diagnosis of sexual masochism disorder applies only if the individual experiences clinically significant distress or impairment in social, occupational, or other important areas of functioning.

The current version of the International Classification of Diseases (ICD-11) of the World Health Organization does not contain any reference to masochism as a disorder. According to respective working group the arousal patterns as such do not represent mental disorders, and have been deleted from the classifications of disorders.

BDSM is a colloquial term relating to individuals who willingly engage in consenting forms of pain or humiliation, typically for sexual purposes. It is not a diagnosable condition in the DSM and ICD systems.

=== Previous terminology ===
Sadomasochism appeared in the previous version of the International Classification of Diseases (ICD-10) of the World Health Organization. It referred to the "preference for sexual activity that involves bondage or the infliction of pain or humiliation" (p. 172), and divided sadomasochism into "masochism" and "sadism" according to whether the individual prefers to be the recipient or provider of the pain or humiliation. The ICD-10 specified that mild forms of sadomasochism "are commonly used to enhance otherwise normal sexual activity" (p. 172) and that the diagnosis applies only if the behavior is preferred or required for sexual gratification. The condition was classified as one of the disorders of sexual preference, which include the paraphilias (p. 170).

Sexual masochism was the term employed in the DSM-III, DSM-IV, DSM-IV-TR. Each manual noted that the condition referred to real rather than simulated or fantasized pain or humiliation.

Masochism was the term employed by the DSM-II. In that manual, the condition was classified as a sexual deviation, which was used to describe "individuals whose sexual interests are directed primarily toward … coitus performed under bizarre circumstances" (p. 44). The term paraphilia was not used in the DSM-II, and diagnoses did not have specific criteria until DSM-III.

Although sexual sadism was mentioned in DSM-I as one of the sexual deviations (p. 39), sexual masochism was not.

== Features ==
The prevalence of sexual masochism disorder in the population is unknown, but the DSM-5 suggests that 2.2% of males and 1.3% of females may be involved in BDSM, whether they have sexual masochism disorder or not. Extensive use of pornography depicting humiliation is sometimes associated with sexual masochism disorder.

Behaviors associated with sexual masochism disorder can be acted out alone (e.g., binding, sticking with pins, electric shock, and mutilation) or with a partner (e.g., physical restraint; blindfolding; paddling; spanking; whipping; beating; electric shock; cutting; pinning and piercing) and humiliation, such as by being urinated or defecated upon, being forced to crawl and bark like a dog, and being verbally abused)., and include being forced to cross-dress and being treated like an infant.

In extreme cases, accidental deaths can occur, such as from engaging in self-application of electric shock. One of the most extreme cases of masochism was that of Bernd Brandes, who answered a person advertisement from Armin Meiwes, who was seeking someone who wanted to be slaughtered and eaten.

== Comorbidity ==
There is limited empirical research on diagnoses that are common with sexual masochism disorder. Other paraphilic disorders are found to be comorbid with sexual masochism disorder in treatment settings. A small study of 120 women found an association between sexual masochism disorder and borderline personality disorder (BPD). Those with BPD were ten times more likely to have sexual masochism disorder compared to patients with other personality disorders. Those with BPD and sexual masochism disorder also reported more childhood sexual abuse.

== Controversy over Sexual Masochism Disorder ==
There is controversy over whether sexual masochism disorder should remain in the DSM. Those for the diagnosis argue the DSM differentiates between what is considered normal and pathology, and that retention of the diagnosis can be useful for research purposes, particularly in forensic populations. There also may be serious consequences (e.g., accidental death) if sexual masochism disorder is accompanied with asphyxiophilia, which involves practices to deprive oxygen to the brain.

However, many authors suggest that sexual masochism disorder is based on public opinion rather than scientific research, and that the diagnosis contributes to continued misconceptions and stigmatization.

The DSM-V-TR characterizes sexual interests as being normophilic (normal) or paraphilic (anomalous). Paraphilia includes "any intense and persistent sexual interest other than sexual interest in genital stimulation or preparatory fondling with phenotypically normal, physically mature, consenting human partners”. All other interests are considered paraphilic. However, paraphilic interests are not unusual. In a study of 1,040 adults, 45.6% reported a desire to experience at least one paraphilic behavior, 23.8% reported a desire for masochism, and 19.2% reported engaging in masochism at least once in their life.

== See also ==
- Sexual sadism disorder – Paraphilia in which a subject derives gratification from inflicting pain
- Leopold von Sacher-Masoch – Austrian author (1836–1895)
- Masochistic personality disorder – Proposed personality disorder
- Cuckoldry – Husband of an adulterous wife
