= Matthew Genitempo =

American photographer (born 1983)

Matthew Genitempo (born 1983) is an American photographer, living in Texas. He has produced three books of black and white photographs of landscapes and people in the Southern United States: Jasper (2018), Mother of Dogs (2022), and Dogbreath (2024).

== Early life and education ==
Genitempo was born in Houston, Texas. He graduated from Baylor University, Waco, TX in 2007 with a degree in graphic design. In 2009, he and Jonathan Standefer co-created the web site Lamebook. Genitempo received an MFA from the University of Hartford, Hartford, CT in 2017.

== Life and work ==
Genitempo's first book, Jasper (2018), "is a poetic exploration of the American landscape and the people who seek peace within its grasp", made in the forests and mountains of the Ozarks and of "people who have sought escape in those woods". Made in black and white, it is named after Jasper, Arkansas where many of the pictures were made.

The book Mother of Dogs (2022) captures the landscapes of Marfa, Texas, in black and white images taken on walks during the COVID-19 pandemic. It "functions like a visual document of the ritual of walking" with "images of fields and dusty desert plains, backyards and railroad crossings, blurred pathways" and portraits of his partner Ada. Genitempo used a 6×7 film camera.

Dogbreath (2024) is a book of black and white photographs centered around a community of adolescents in Tucson, Arizona.

Along with Bryan Schutmaat and Cody Haltom, Genitempo runs photobook publisher Trespasser, originally founded in 2017.

== Publications ==
- Jasper. Los Angeles, CA: Twin Palms, 2018. ISBN 978-1-936611-13-3.
  - Second edition. Los Angeles, CA: Twin Palms, 2024.
- Mother of Dogs. Austin, TX: Trespasser, 2022. Edition of 375 copies.
- Dogbreath. Austin, TX: Trespasser, 2024. Includes a cassette tape with audio accompaniment by Michael A. Muller.
