= Hedonophobia =

Fear of obtaining pleasure

- Specialty: Psychology

Hedonophobia is an excessive fear or aversion to obtaining pleasure. The purported background of some such associated feelings may be due to an egalitarian-related sentiment, whereby one feels a sense of solidarity with individuals in the lowest Human Development Index countries. For others, a recurring thought that some things are too good to be true has resulted in an ingrainedness that they are not entitled to feel too good. Sometimes, it can be triggered by a religious upbringing wherein asceticism is propounded.

Hedonophobia is formally defined as the fear of experiencing pleasure. 'Hedon' or 'hedone' comes from ancient Greek, meaning 'pleasure' + fear: 'phobia'. Hedonophobia is the inability to enjoy pleasurable experiences, and is often a persistent malady. Diagnosis of the condition is usually related to the age of 'maturity' in each country where the syndrome exists. For instance, in the US a person must be 18 years old to be considered an adult, whereas in Canada they must be 18 or 19 years old, depending on the province of residence. Globally, the ages range from (+/-) 12 to 24 years and are mainly determined by traditional ethical practices from previous societies. High anxiety, panic attacks, and extreme fear are symptoms that can result from anticipating pleasure of any kind. Expecting or anticipating pleasure at some point in the future can also trigger an attack.

Hedonophobics have a type of guilt about feeling pleasure or experiencing pleasurable sensations, due to a cultural background or training (either religious or cultural) that eschews pleasurable pursuits as frivolous or inappropriate. Oftentimes, social guilt is connected to having fun while others are suffering, and is common for those who feel undeserving or have self-worth issues to work through. Also, there is a sense that they should not be given pleasures due to their lack of performance in life, and because they have done things that are deemed "wrong" or "undeserving".

To determine the depth of the diagnosis for those who suffer from hedonophobia, background is crucial. For example, when a child is taught that a strong work ethic is all that makes them worthy of the good things in life, guilt becomes a motivator to move away from pleasure when they begin to experience it. The individual learns that pleasures are bad, and feeling good is not as sanctified as being empathetic towards those who suffer.

Cognitive behavioral therapy is an effective approach to the resolution of past beliefs that infiltrate and affect the sufferer's current responses to various situations. Medication is only necessary when there is an interference in the person's normal daily functioning. Various techniques are used by those afflicted with the condition to hide, camouflage or mask their aversion to pleasure.

Any relationship that includes things that are pleasurable is re-established when the sufferer learns that they are not worthy of anything pleasurable, or that they only deserve the opposite of those things which are pleasurable. A disconnect is necessary to determine the sufferer's lack of ability to intervene in the overall process.

== See also ==
- Self-defeating personality disorder
- List of phobias
