= Bryan Schutmaat =

American photographer

Bryan Schutmaat (born November 3, 1983) is an American photographer based in Texas, USA. Schutmaat book's include Grays the Mountain Sends (2013), which won the Aperture Foundation Portfolio Prize; Islands of the Blest (2014); Good Goddamn (2017); County Road (2023); and Sons Of The Living (2024). His work is held in the collections of Baltimore Museum of Art, Hood Museum of Art, Middlebury College Museum of Art, Museum of Fine Arts, Houston and San Francisco Museum of Modern Art.

== Life and work ==
Schutmaat was born in Houston, Texas in 1983. He received his MFA in photography from the University of Hartford in 2012

His first book, Grays the Mountain Sends (2013) portrays mountain towns and former mining communities of the American West through portraits of people and landscapes. The work was inspired by Montana poet Richard Hugo. He made the work with a large format 4x5" view camera and in color, but his subsequent work so far has been in black and white.

Islands of the Blest (2014), is a compilation of historic photographs taken in the American West from the 1870s to the 1970s. He and Ashlyn Davis sourced from the online archives of the Library of Congress and United States Geological Survey.

Photographed in just a few days, Good Goddamn (2017) is about a friend "from rural Texas and his last few days of freedom before going to prison." The book was the first publication of Trespasser, a Texas-based art book publisher Schutmaat co-founded and runs with Matthew Genitempo and Cody Haltom.

County Road (2023), created during the COVID pandemic is a quiet and intimate look at the Texas landscape and small towns closer to home rather than the Southwestern desert where Schutmaat works on his long-term projects. The black and white photos shot with small hand-held camera capture natural and rural scenes along the rural routes between Austin where Schutmaat lives and Leon County, the site of his family's farm.

Sons of the Living (2024) is about the land and people along the highways of America's deserts. Photographed in the American West's deserts, the work depicts endurance amidst environmental decline, economic dispossession, and societal uncertainty. Like Grays the Mountain Sends, the work involved extensive travels in the American West, was photographed with a 4x5 camera, and consists of a mix of portraits and landscapes

== Publications ==
=== Books by Schutmaat ===
- Grays the Mountain Sends. New York City: Silas Finch Foundation, 2013. ISBN 978-1-936063-03-1. Edition of 600 copies.
  - Second edition. New York City: Silas Finch Foundation, 2014. ISBN 978-1-936063-07-9. Edition of 1200 copies.
- Good Goddamn. Austin, TX: Trespasser, 2017. ISBN 978-0-692-94637-4. Edition of 750 copies.
  - Second edition. Austin, TX: Trespasser, 2018. With a letter by Kris. Edition of 750 copies.
- County Road. Austin, TX: Trespasser, 2023. ISBN 979-8-218-08041-9. Edition of 1500 copies.
- Sons Of The Living. Austin, TX: Trespasser, 2024. ISBN 979-8-9879702-3-2.
  - Second edition. Austin, TX: Trespasser, 2025.

=== Books paired with another ===
- Islands of the Blest. New York City: Silas Finch Foundation, 2014. Edited by Schutmaat and Ashlyn Davis. ISBN 978-1-936063-10-9. With a poem by Michael McGriff, "Letter sewn into a pantcuff of smoke". Edition of 800 copies.
  - Second edition. New York City: Silas Finch Foundation, 2016.

== Awards ==
- Aperture Portfolio Prize, Aperture Foundation, New York City, winner, 2013 for Grays the Mountain Sends
- Paris Photo–Aperture Foundation PhotoBook Awards, First Book Award, shortlisted, 2013 for Grays the Mountain Sends
- The New York Photo Awards, photobook category, winner, 2014, for Grays the Mountain Sends
- John Simon Guggenheim Memorial Fellowship, 2020

== Collections ==
Schutmaat's work is held in the following public collections:

- Baltimore Museum of Art: 2 prints
- Hood Museum of Art: 1 print
- Middlebury College Museum of Art, Middlebury College, Middlebury, VT: 1 print
- Museum of Fine Arts, Houston: 1 print
- San Francisco Museum of Modern Art: 2 prints
