= Immature personality disorder =

Personality disorder

- Specialty: Psychiatry
- Symptoms: Lack of stamina; Poor adaptation capabilities
- Diagnostic method: Based on reported symptoms
- Differential diagnosis: anxiety disorder, phobia, conversion disorder, histrionic personality disorder, dependent personality disorder, passive-aggressive personality disorder, autism

Immature personality disorder was a type of personality disorder diagnosis. It is characterized by lack of emotional development, low tolerance of stress and anxiety, inability to accept personal responsibility, and reliance on age-inappropriate defense mechanisms. It has been noted for displaying "an absence of mental disability", and demonstrating "ineffectual responses to social, psychological and physical demands."

== History ==
The definition borrowed by the first edition of the DSM (see Diagnosis) was originally published in the Army Service Forces's Medical 203 in 1945 under Immaturity Reactions. It had five subtypes:

- Emotional instability reaction (later histrionic personality disorder): excitability, ineffectiveness, undependable judgement, poorly controlled hostility, guilt and anxiety;
- Passive-dependency reaction (later dependent personality disorder): helplessness, indecisiveness, tendency to cling to others;
- Passive-aggressive reaction (later passive-aggressive personality disorder): pouting, stubbornness, procrastination, inefficiency, passive obstructionism;
- Aggressive reaction: irritability, temper tantrums, destructive behavior;
- Immaturity with symptomatic "habit" reaction: e.g. speech disorder brought on by stress.

== Diagnosis ==
=== DSM ===
Immature personality (321), as "Personality trait disturbance", only appeared in the first edition of the Diagnostic and Statistical Manual of Mental Disorders (DSM), separately from personality disorders. The DSM defines the condition as follows:

"This category applies to individuals who are unable to maintain their emotional equilibrium and independence under minor or major stress because of disturbances in emotional development. [...] This classification will be applied only to cases of personality disorder in which the neurotic features (such as anxiety, conversion, phobia, etc.) are relatively insignificant, and the basic personality maldevelopment is the crucial distinguishing factor. Evidence of physical immaturity may or may not be present."

Some of its subtypes became separate conditions (see History). In DSM-II "immature" became a type specifier for Other personality disorder (301.89), and remained unchanged in the DSM-III. (Note: "Other Personality Disorder should be used when the clinician judges that a specific Personality Disorder not included in this classification is appropriate, such as Masochistic, Impulsive, or Immature Personality Disorder. In such instances the clinician should record the specific Other personality Disorder, using the 301.89 code.") The condition does not appear in later editions.

=== ICD ===
The International Classification of Diseases (ICD) also listed the condition as Immature personality (321) in the ICD-6 and ICD-7. The ICD-8 introduced Other personality disorder (301.8) which became the main diagnosis adding "immature" as a type specifier. This classification was shared by the ICD-9 (301.89) and ICD-10 (F60.8). The specifier was removed in ICD-11.

== Mechanics ==
=== Early explanations ===
The underlying mechanism of the disorder was originally explained either as fixation (certain character patterns persisting from childhood to adult life), or as a regressive reaction due to severe stress (reversion to an earlier stage of development).

Poor emotional control "require[s] quick mobilization of defense, usually explosive in nature, for the protection of the ego." In case of dependency "there is a predominant child-parent relationship." The "morbid resentment" of the aggressive type is the result of a "deep dependency" hidden by reaction formation.

=== Later developments ===
IPD involves a weakness of the ego, which limits the ability to restrain impulses or properly model anxiety. They fail to integrate the aggressive and libidinal factors at play in other people, and thus are not able to parse their own experiences.

It can be caused by a neurobiological immaturity of brain functioning, or through a childhood trauma, or other means.

== Epidemiology ==
Determining the prevalence of the disorder in the general population would be difficult because it has not had a separate diagnosis since World War II. As part of Other personality disorder it can be estimated to be a fraction of 1.6% in the United States and 2.4% in Denmark.

A Russian study of military age persons in the Tomsk region between 2016 and 2018 reported that mental and behavioral disorders were detected in 13.6% of the recruits, and 3.6% could be diagnosed with immature personality disorder.

== Society and culture ==
In the 1980s, it was noted that immature personality disorder was one of the most common illnesses invoked by the Roman Catholic Church in order to facilitate annulment of undesired marriages.

In 1978, David Augustine Walton was tried in Barbados for killing two passersby who had offered his mother and girlfriend a ride following an argument, and pleaded diminished capacity resulting from his immature personality disorder; he was nevertheless convicted of murder.

In 1989, a former employee of the Wisconsin Department of Transportation had his claim of discrimination dismissed, after alleging that his employment had been terminated due to his Immature Personality Disorder alongside a sexual fetish in which he placed chocolate bars under the posteriors of women whose driving capabilities he was testing.

A 1994 Australian case regarding unemployment benefits noted that while "mere personal distaste for certain work is not relevant, but a condition (such as immature personality disorder) may foreclose otherwise suitable prospects".

A 2017 study indicated that an individual with immature personality disorder (among other people with personality disorders) was allowed to die through Belgian euthanasia laws that require a medical diagnosis of a life-long condition that could impair well-being.
