= Autosadism =

Form of independently directed sadomasochistic play

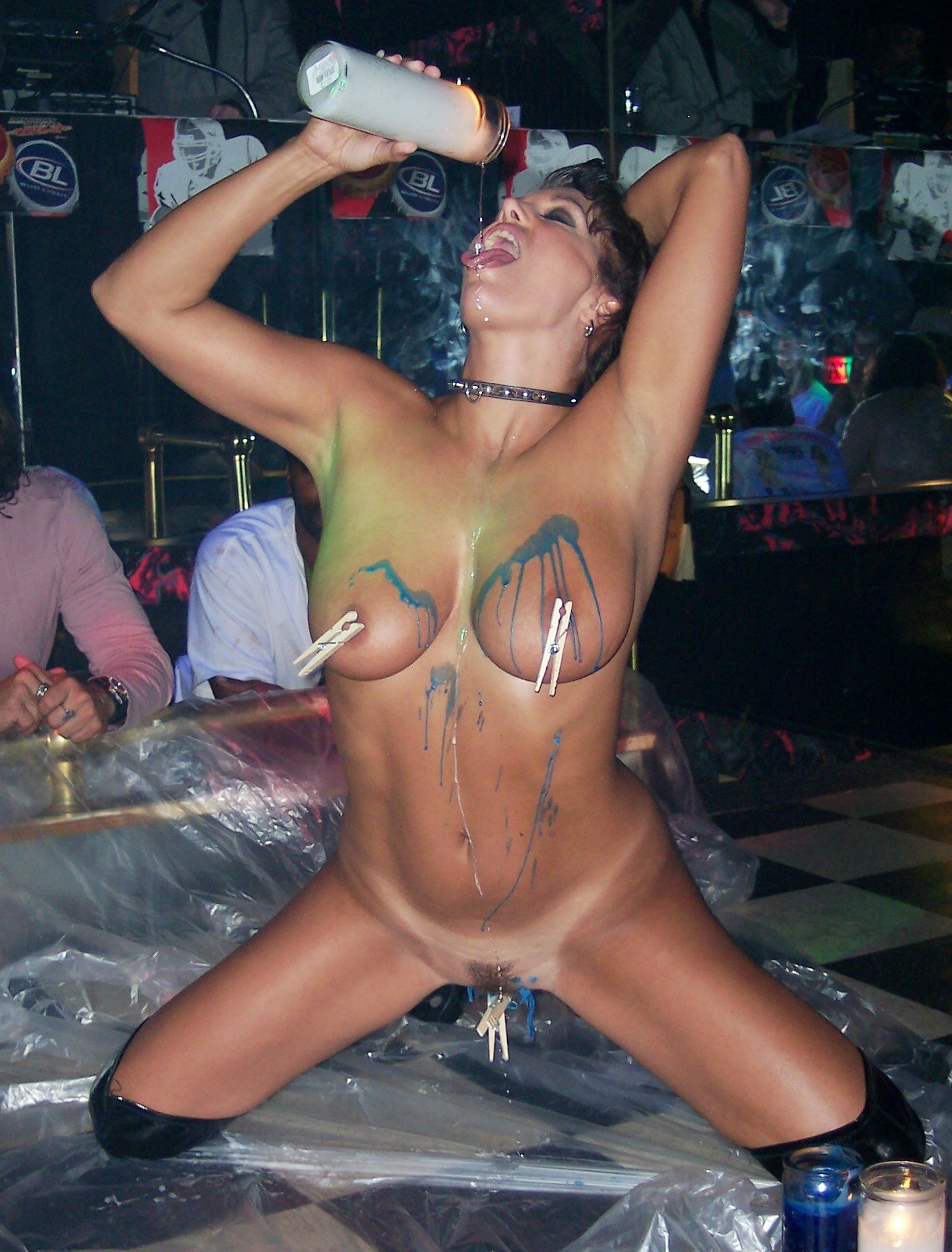
The photo shows pornographic actress Felicia Fox pouring low-melting-point candle wax over herself in front of an audience (U.S. 2005).

Autosadism, or automasochism, is behaviour inflicting pain or humiliation on oneself. It may be related to self-harm or a paraphilia involving sexual arousal. It can be viewed as a form of masochism, a sublimated form of sadism, or a means to experiencing algolagnia, a sexual tendency which is defined by deriving sexual pleasure and stimulation from physical pain.

== See also ==
- Self-defeating personality disorder
- Self-destructive behaviour
- Mortification of the flesh
