= Algolagnia =

Core tendency of sadomasochism

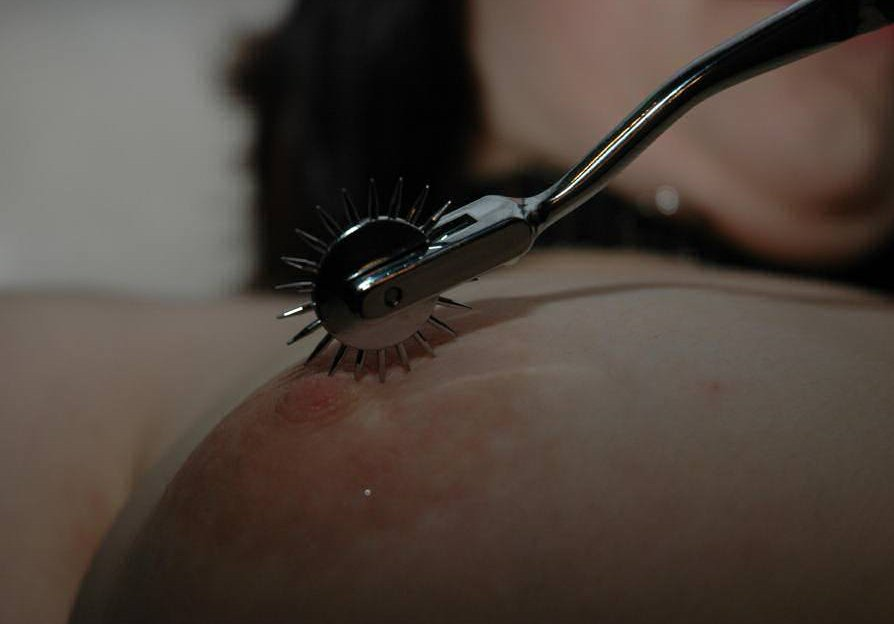
Wartenberg wheel pain stimulation of the areola and nipple

Algolagnia (/ælɡəˈlæɡniə/; from Greek: ἄλγος, álgos, "pain", and Greek: λαγνεία, lagneía, "lust") is a sexual tendency which is defined by deriving sexual pleasure and stimulation from physical pain, often involving an erogenous zone. Studies conducted indicate differences in how the brains of those with algolagnia interpret nerve input.

== History of research ==
In 1892, Albert von Schrenck-Notzing introduced the term algolagnia to describe "sexual" masochism, to differentiate it from Charles Féré's earlier term called "algophilia"; Schrenck-Notzing's interpretation was that algolagnia involved lust, not love as Fere interpreted the phenomenon. (It should be cautioned, though, that the definitions regarding sadism and masochism as medical terms have changed over the years (as also noted in the main article for that topic) and are still evolving, and there are also non-medical definitions of sadomasochism.) However, Krafft-Ebing's theories in Psychopathia Sexualis – where the terms sadism and masochism were used – were adopted by Sigmund Freud and became an integral part of psychoanalysis, thereby ensuring their predominance over the concept of "algolagnia".

The neurologist Albert Eulenberg was another one of the first researchers to look into algolagnia, in the 1902 Sadismus und Masochismus (Sadism and Masochism). Soon thereafter, Havelock Ellis also looked into algolagnia, in the early 1900s, and stated "Sadism and Masochism – Algolagnia Includes Both Groups of Manifestations" but maintained that enjoyment of pain was restricted to an erotic context, in contrast to Krafft-Ebing's interpretations. With such titles as Analysis of the Sexual Impulse, Love and Pain, The Sexual Impulse in Women and The Evolution of Modesty, The Phenomena of Sexual Periodicity, Auto-Erotism, Ellis described the basics of the condition. Eugen Kahn, Smith Ely Jelliffe, William Alanson White, and Hugh Northcote were other early psychological researchers into algolagnia.

== Research ==
In 1992, algolagnia was described as a physical phenomenon in which the brain interprets pain signals as pleasurable leading to psychological effects. Dolf Zillmann wrote that:

...most algolagniacs see their actions as an active lust, not a motivational one. Patients with algolagnia could lead normal lives, enjoy normal arousal sequences, and indulge in fairly normal sexual intercourse, but when exposed to sexual pain, were unable to control their reaction. One woman described it as being unable to prevent her arousal or subsequent orgasm due to pain, even if she was not aroused when it began.

This and other research have linked algolagnia to aggression, hypersexuality, or other control psychoses.

Research using MRI and computer models of neuron firing patterns has shown that most algolagniacs experience pain differently from others. Algolagniacs may have DNA errors such as SCN9A, causing inaccurate nociception to occur.

At least one researcher in the 1900s, Albert Freiherr von Schrenck-Notzing, who was a self-professed sadist, thought that algolagnia was a psychological disorder. This view began to change once the Kinsey Reports noted that many seemingly normal people often enjoy pain in a sexual context, and later Norman Breslow found that, before 1977, only four previous studies in all the scientific literature were empirical in nature. One of the researchers whom Breslow cited as having empirically-valid work, Andres Spengler, concluded that earlier research was "heavily burdened with prejudice and ignorance" against those whose sexual practices were in the minority, falsely assuming behaviors to be pathological when in fact they were statistically abnormal, but harmless. In 1993 Thomas Wetzstein published a large-scale study of his local subculture from a sociological viewpoint, confirming Spengler's results and expanding on them.

No empirical study has found a connection to violent crimes or evidence for an increased tendency towards any sociopathological behavior in algolagnia or the related features of sexual sadomasochism, as had been generally assumed since Krafft-Ebing's era.

The term algolagnia has fallen into rare usage, and there is no entry for it in the American Psychiatric Association's DSM IV-TR. Inflicting pain on others has been termed "active algolagnia" and equated to the pathological form of sadism in Mosby's Medical Dictionary, which also equates the pathological form of masochism to "passive algolagnia", but it cannot be a pathological (dangerous) paraphilia form of sadism or masochism unless it involves pain inflicted on "non-consenting" persons, or "cause[s] marked distress or interpersonal difficulty." And using algolagnia as both a pathological and non-pathological term, some in the modern research community still link it to some but not all BDSM activities.

There is little ongoing research, with most neurophysiologists concentrating on neuropathological reasons for such reactions.

== See also ==
- Autosadism – Form of independently directed sadomasochistic play
- Maledom – Erotic practice
- Mortification of the flesh – Act by which an individual or group seeks to deaden their sinful nature
- Sexual masochism disorder – Mental disorder involving sexual arousal from enduring pain, suffering, or humiliation
