= Other and unspecified personality disorders =

Medical diagnostic category

For the diagnosis of personality disorders, diagnostic frameworks such as the Diagnostic and Statistical Manual of Mental Disorders (DSM) and the International Classification of Diseases (ICD) have residual diagnostic categories for diagnosis of conditions which do not align well with specific PD diagnoses or for situations where information is lacking.

The DSM-5 defines two personality disorder diagnoses, namely Other specified personality disorder and Unspecified personality disorder, along with Personality change due to another medical condition under Other personality disorders. The ICD-10 also contains similar categories, namely, Other specific personality disorder and Personality disorder, unspecified.

Additionally, in the Alternative DSM-5 Model for Personality Disorders, the DSM-5 introduced the diagnosis Personality disorder - trait specified (PD-TS) as an alternative to let clinicians define the presentation in detail, in terms of "impairment of personality functioning" and "pathological personality traits".

Personality disorder not otherwise specified (PD-NOS) was a subclinical (Note: "Subclinical" in the sense that the person does not meet the diagnostic criteria for any specific personality disorder, but does meet the general criteria for a personality disorder diagnosis.) diagnostic classification for some DSM-IV Axis II personality disorders not listed in DSM-IV. The DSM-5 transitioned from NOS diagnoses to other specified and unspecified in order to "enhance diagnostic specificity". The diagnoses in the DSM-5 are not direct equivalents to PD-NOS.

== Diagnosis types ==
In all cases of non-specific diagnoses it is a requirement that the person meet the general criteria for personality disorders.

=== Other specified & Other specific ===
The ICD-10 defines the diagnosis Other specific personality disorder (F60.8) for personality disorders that don't have a separate code. This diagnosis allows the following type specifiers: "eccentric", "haltlose", "immature", "narcissistic", "passive-aggressive", and "psychoneurotic". The DSM-5 contains the similarly named diagnosis Other Specified Personality Disorder (301.89; F60.89), which is used when recording the presence of personality disorder along with the reasons for the condition not being classified as one of the specific personality disorders.

=== Unspecified ===
The ICD-10 contains Personality disorder, unspecified (F60.9) for general personality disorder diagnoses. The DSM-5 diagnosis of Unspecified Personality Disorder (301.9; F60.9) is, according to the DSM-5, used when a patient presents with personality disorder symptoms that cause distress or impairment, but the clinician either chooses not to indicate the specific reason these criteria are not met for any one disorder, or there isn’t enough information available to make a more precise diagnosis.

=== Not otherwise specified ===
This diagnosis was part of the DSM-IV-TR, and could be assigned when no other personality disorder in the DSM fit the patient's symptoms. This diagnosis is not included in subsequent (DSM-5 and DSM-5-TR) editions of the DSM. The DSM-IV-TR excluded four personality disorders, but this diagnosis may be used instead. The four excluded personality disorders are:

- Sadistic personality disorder
- Self-defeating personality disorder
- Depressive personality disorder
- Passive–aggressive personality disorder

=== Severity unspecified ===
In the International Statistical Classification of Diseases and Related Health Problems, 11th Edition ICD-11 of the World Health Organization (WHO), all personality disorders are diagnosed under a single title called "personality disorder” (6D10). The criteria for diagnosis are mainly concerned with assessing dysfunction, distress, and maladaptive behavior. Once a diagnosis has been made, the clinician then can draw upon five trait domains (prominent personality traits or patterns; 6D11) to describe the particular causes of dysfunction, as these have major implications for potential treatments. The unspecified PD diagnosis in the ICD-11 is Personality disorder, severity unspecified (6D10.Z).

== Epidemiology ==
The National Comorbidity Survey Replication estimated the prevalence of PD-NOS in the general population at around 1.6% (0.3-2.9%). Comorbidity measures indicated a strong association with antisocial personality disorder (and generally Cluster B), moderate association with obsessive-compulsive personality disorder, and strong negative association with schizoid and dependent personality disorders.

A 2004 meta-analysis estimated the prevalence of PD-NOS in patient samples between 8-13%. In structured interview studies it is the third most common diagnosis given, in unstructured studies it is the single most frequent diagnosis. Half the studies did not give further definition for the diagnosis, and those that did used "mixed" most often.

In another study, out of 1760 psychotherapy referrals, 21.6% was diagnosed exclusively with PD-NOS. In terms of severity, patients with PD-NOS fell between a formal personality disorder diagnosis and no personality disorder. Patients who received PD-NOS as an additional diagnosis to their formal personality disorder diagnosis had the most severe problems.

== See also ==
- Not otherwise specified
- Other specified feeding or eating disorder
- Mood disorder not otherwise specified
- DSM-IV codes (personality disorders)
