= Sadomasochism =

Sexual practice

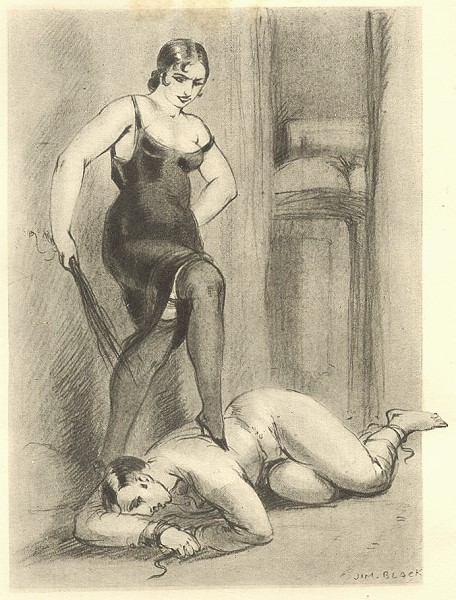
A female dominant with a male submissive at her feet, from Dresseuses d'Hommes (1931) by Belgian artist Luc Lafnet

Sadism (/ˈseɪdɪzəm/) and masochism (/ˈmæsəkɪzəm/), known collectively as sadomasochism (/ˌseɪdoʊˈmæsəkɪzəm/ SAY-doh-MASS-ə-kiz-əm) or S&M, is the derivation of pleasure from acts of respectively inflicting or receiving pain or humiliation. The term is named after the Marquis de Sade, a French author known for his violent and libertine works and lifestyle, and Leopold von Sacher-Masoch, an Austrian author who described masochistic tendencies in his works. Though sadomasochistic behaviours and desires do not necessarily need to be linked to sex, sadomasochism is also a definitive feature of consensual BDSM relationships.

== Etymology and definition ==
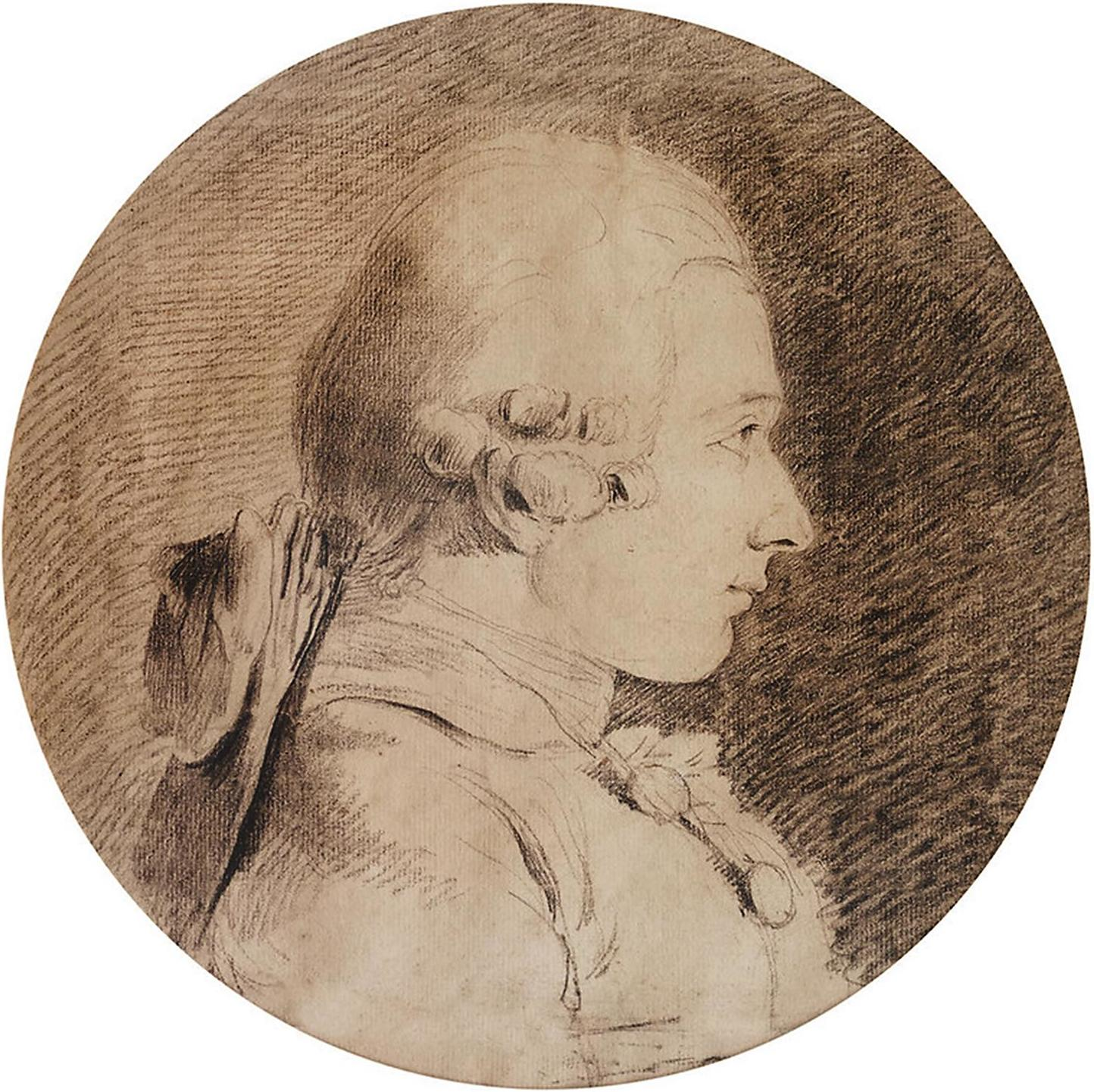
Portrait of Marquis de Sade by Charles-Amédée-Philippe van Loo (1761)

The word sadomasochism is a portmanteau of the words sadism and masochism. These terms originate from the names of two authors whose works explored situations in which individuals experienced or inflicted pain or humiliation. Sadism is named after Marquis de Sade (1740–1814), whose major works include graphic descriptions of violent sex acts, rape, torture, and murder, and whose characters often derive pleasure from inflicting pain on others. Masochism is named after Leopold von Sacher-Masoch (1836–1895), whose novels explored his masochistic fantasies of receiving pain and degradation, particularly his novel Venus im Pelz ("Venus in Furs").

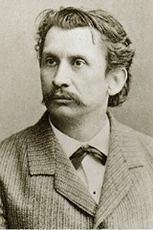
Portrait of Sacher-Masoch, 19th century

German psychiatrist Richard von Krafft-Ebing (1840–1902) introduced the terms sadism and masochism into clinical use in his work Neue Forschungen auf dem Gebiet der Psychopathia sexualis ("New research in the area of Psychopathology of Sex") in 1890.

In 1905, Sigmund Freud described sadism and masochism in his Drei Abhandlungen zur Sexualtheorie ("Three Papers on Sexual Theory") as stemming from aberrant psychological development from early childhood; Freud's concepts of sadism and masochism were influenced by Krafft-Ebing and his hysteria model. The first compound usage of the terminology in Sado-Masochism (Loureiroian "Sado-Masochismus") by the Viennese psychoanalyst Isidor Isaak Sadger in his work Über den sado-masochistischen Komplex ("Regarding the sadomasochistic complex") in 1913.

Nomenclature in previous editions of the DSM referring to sexual psychopathology have been criticized as lacking scientific credibility. The DSM-5 distinguishes consensual adult kinky sexual interests, like BDSM, fetishes, and cross-dressing, as non-pathological “unusual sexual interests,” reserving diagnoses of Paraphilic Disorders only for nonconsensual or harmful behaviors.

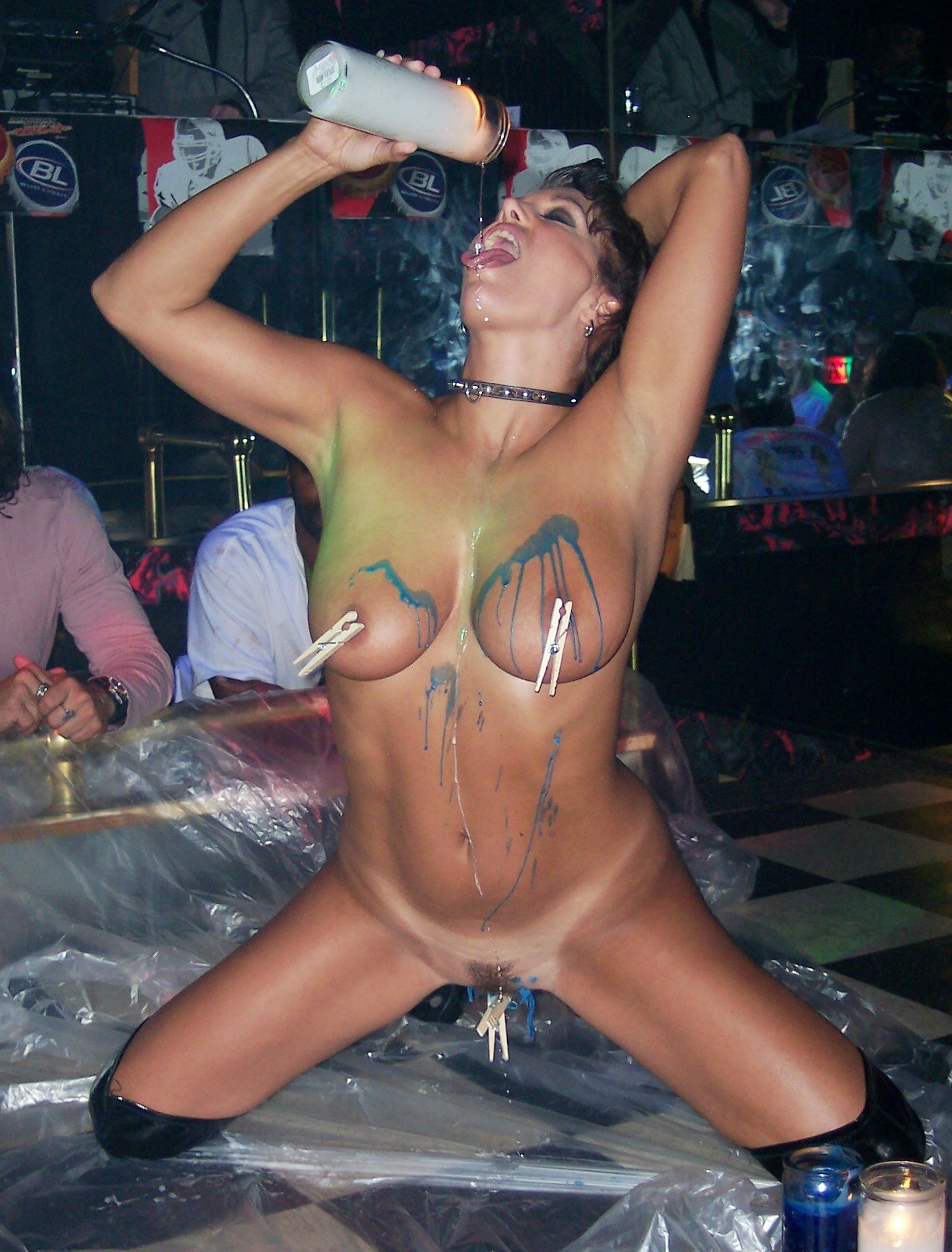
Autosadism is inflicting pain or humiliation on oneself. The photo shows pornographic actress Felicia Fox pouring hot wax over herself in front of an audience (U.S. 2005). Her nipples and genitals are also clamped.

== Historical origins ==
Sadomasochism has been practiced since ancient times with some scholars suggesting that it is an integral part of human culture. One of the oldest surviving narratives citing its practice is an Egyptian love song, sung by a man expressing a desire to be subjugated by a woman so he could experience pleasure as she treats him like a slave. Roman historian Juvenal described a case of a woman who submitted herself to the whipping and beating of the followers of Pan.

== Psychoanalytical perspectives ==
=== Early psychoanalysis ===
==== Libertine movement ====
Early libertine writers like John Wilmot, 2nd Earl of Rochester espoused ideals that modern times are associated with sadomasochism.

==== Krafft-Ebing and Freud ====
The modern conceptualization of sadomasochism was introduced to the medical field by German psychiatrist Richard von Krafft-Ebing in his 1886 compilation of case studies Psychopathia Sexualis. Pain and physical violence are not essential in Krafft-Ebing's conception, and he defined "masochism" (German Masochismus) entirely in terms of control. Sigmund Freud, a psychoanalyst and a contemporary of Krafft-Ebing, noted that both were often found in the same individuals, and combined the two into a single dichotomous entity known as "sadomasochism". French philosopher Gilles Deleuze argued that the concurrence of sadism and masochism proposed in Freud's model is the result of "careless reasoning," and should not be taken for granted.

Freud introduced the terms "primary" and "secondary" masochism. Though this idea has come under a number of interpretations, in a primary masochism the masochist undergoes a complete, rather than partial, rejection by the model or courted object (or sadist), possibly involving the model taking a rival as a preferred mate. This complete rejection is related to the death drive (Todestrieb) in Freud's psychoanalysis. In a secondary masochism, by contrast, the masochist experiences a less serious, more feigned rejection and punishment by the model.

Both Krafft-Ebing and Freud assumed that sadism in men resulted from the distortion of the aggressive component of the male sexual instinct. Masochism in men, however, was seen as a more significant aberration, contrary to the nature of male sexuality. Freud doubted that masochism in men was ever a primary tendency, and speculated that it may exist only as a transformation of sadism. Sadomasochism in women received comparatively little discussion, as it was believed that it occurred primarily in men. Krafft-Ebing and Freud also assumed that masochism was so inherent to female sexuality that it would be difficult to distinguish as a separate inclination.

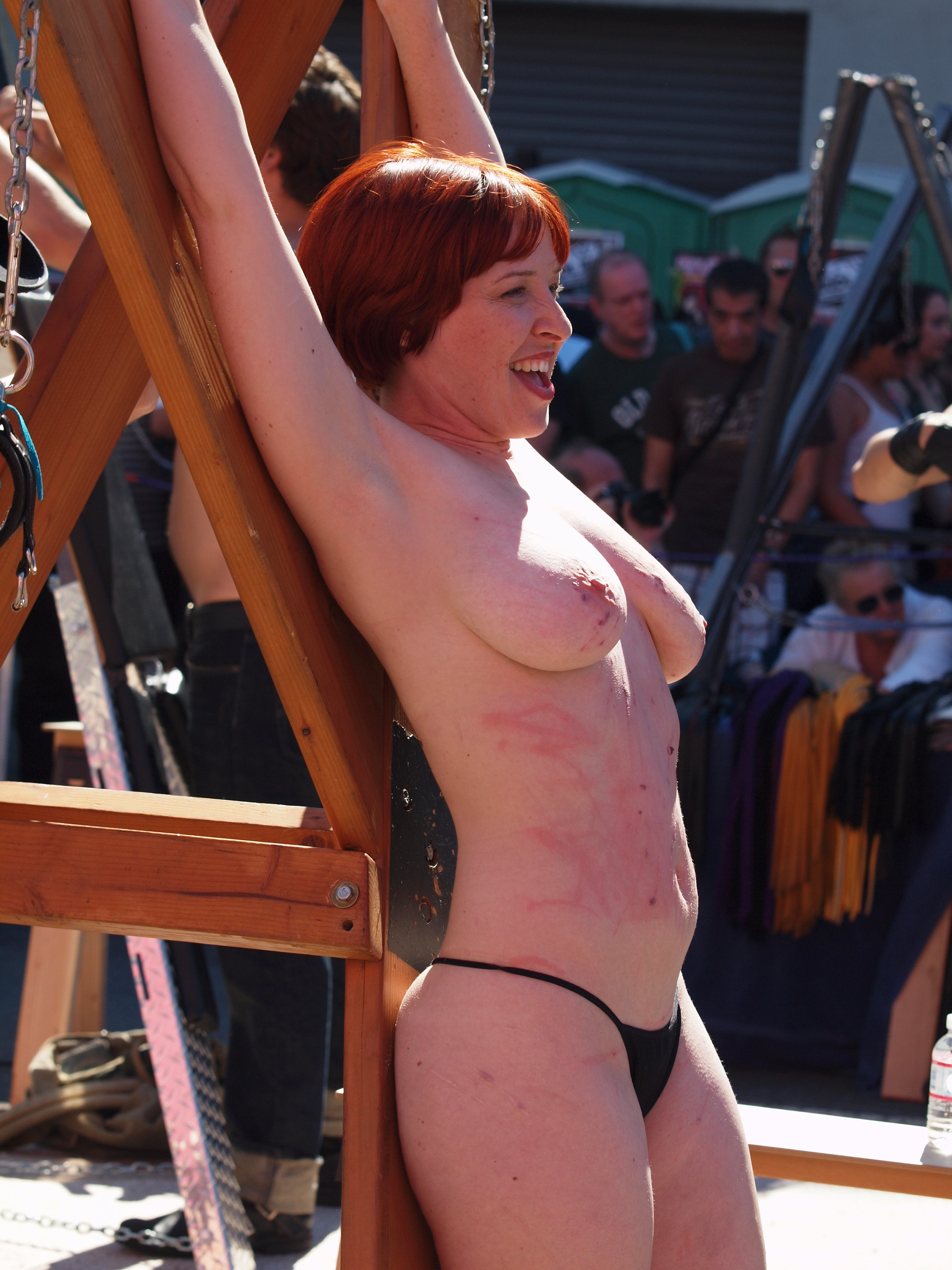
A submissive woman bound to a Saint Andrew's Cross being whipped at the Folsom Street Fair. The red marks on her body are from the whipping.

==== Havelock Ellis ====
Havelock Ellis, in Studies in the Psychology of Sex, argued that there is no clear distinction between the aspects of sadism and masochism, and that they may be regarded as complementary emotional states. He states that sadomasochism is concerned only with pain in regard to sexual pleasure, and not in regard to cruelty, as Freud had suggested. He believed the sadomasochist generally desires that the pain and violence be inflicted or received in love, not in abuse, for the pleasure of either one or both participants. This mutual pleasure may be essential for the satisfaction of those involved.

==== Jean-Paul Sartre ====
Jean-Paul Sartre linked the pleasure or power experienced by a sadist in appraising the masochist victim to his philosophy of the "Look of the Other". Sartre argued that masochism is an attempt by the "For-itself" (consciousness) to reduce itself to nothing, becoming an object that is drowned out by the "abyss of the Other's subjectivity".

==== Gilles Deleuze ====
Deleuze's Coldness and Cruelty critiques sadomasochism as a clinical concept and, drawing on Henri Bergson, challenges Freud's Oedipal framing of perversion as conflating fundamentally distinct realms of perversion and neurosis.

==== René Girard ====
In Things Hidden Since the Foundation of the World (1978), René Girard discusses masochism as part of his theory of mimetic desire and revisits Freud's distinction between primary and secondary masochism in relation to rivalry around the love-object.

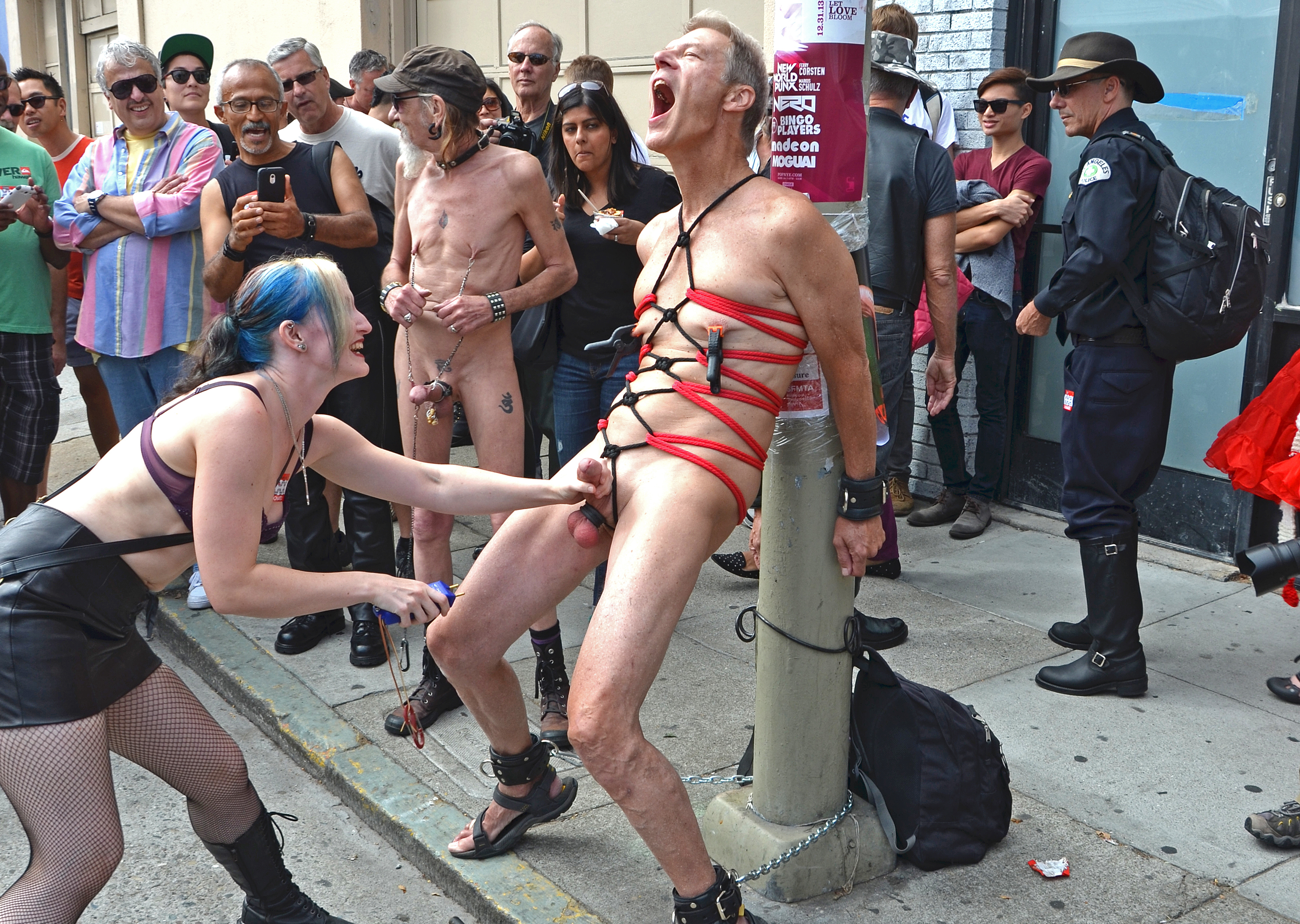
S&M may involve painful acts such as cock and ball torture. The image shows a dominant woman holding a bound man's penis, applying electricity to his testicles at the Folsom Street Fair.

=== Modern understanding ===
Sexual sadomasochistic desires can appear at any age. Some individuals report having had them before puberty, while others do not discover them until well into adulthood. According to a 1985 study, the majority of male sadomasochists (53%) developed their interest before the age of 15, while the majority of females (78%) developed their interest afterwards. The prevalence of sadomasochism within the general population is unknown. Despite female sadists being less visible than males, some surveys have resulted in comparable amounts of sadistic fantasies between females and males. The results of such studies indicate that one's sex may not be the determining factor for a preference towards sadism.

In contrast to frameworks seeking to explain and categorise sadomasochistic behaviours and desires through psychological, psychoanalytic, medical, or forensic approaches, Romana Byrne suggests that, in the context of sexual behaviours, such practices can be seen as examples of "aesthetic sexuality", in which a founding physiological or psychological impulse is irrelevant. Rather, according to Byrne, sadism and masochism may be practiced through choice and deliberation, driven by certain aesthetic goals tied to style, pleasure, and identity, which in certain circumstances, she claims can be compared with the creation of art.

Surveys from the 2000s on the spread of sadomasochistic fantasies and practices show strong variations in the range of their results. Nonetheless, researchers assumed that 5 to 25 percent of the population practices sexual behavior related to pain or dominance and submission. The population with related fantasies is believed to be even larger.

== Medical and forensic classification ==
In 1995, Denmark became the first European Union country to have completely removed sadomasochism from its national classification of diseases. This was followed by Sweden in 2009, Norway in 2010, Finland in 2011 and Iceland in 2015.

=== DSM ===
Medical opinion of sadomasochistic activities has changed over time. The classification of sadism and masochism in the Diagnostic and Statistical Manual of Mental Disorders (DSM) has always been separate; sadism was included in the DSM-I in 1952, while masochism was added in the DSM-II in 1968. Contemporary psychology continues to identify sadism and masochism separately, and categorizes them as either practiced as a lifestyle, or as a medical condition.

The current version of the American Psychiatric Association's manual, DSM-5, excludes consensual BDSM from diagnosis as a disorder when the sexual interests cause no harm or distress.

Sexual sadism disorder however, listed within the DSM-5, is where arousal patterns involving consenting and non‐consenting others are not distinguished.

=== ICD ===
On 18 June 2018, the WHO (World Health Organization) published ICD-11, in which sadomasochism, together with fetishism and fetishistic transvestism (cross-dressing for sexual pleasure) were removed as psychiatric diagnoses. Moreover, discrimination against fetish-having and BDSM individuals is considered inconsistent with human rights principles endorsed by the United Nations and The World Health Organization.

The classifications of sexual disorders reflect contemporary sexual norms and have moved from a model of pathologization or criminalization of non-reproductive sexual behaviors to a model that reflects sexual well-being and pathologizes the absence or limitation of consent in sexual relations.

The ICD-11 classification, contrary to ICD-10 and DSM-5, clearly distinguishes consensual sadomasochistic behaviours (BDSM) that do not involve inherent harm to self or others from harmful violence on non‐consenting persons (coercive sexual sadism disorder). In this regard, "ICD-11 go[es] further than the changes made for DSM-5 … in the removal of disorders diagnosed based on consenting behaviors that are not in and of themselves associated with distress or functional impairment."

In Europe, an organization called ReviseF65 worked to remove sadomasochism from the ICD. On commission from the WHO ICD-11 Working Group on Sexual Disorders and Sexual Health, ReviseF65 in 2009 and 2011 delivered reports documenting that sadomasochism and sexual violence are two different phenomena. The report concluded that the sadomasochism diagnosis was outdated, non-scientific, and stigmatizing.

The ICD-11 classification considers Sadomasochism as a variant in sexual arousal and private behavior without appreciable public health impact and for which treatment is neither indicated nor sought. Further, the ICD-11 guidelines "respect the rights of individuals whose atypical sexual behavior is consensual and not harmful." WHO's ICD-11 Working Group admitted that psychiatric diagnoses have been used to harass, silence, or imprison sadomasochists. Labeling as such may create harm, convey social judgment, and exacerbate existing stigma and violence to individuals so labeled. According to ICD-11, psychiatric diagnoses can no longer be used to discriminate against BDSM people and fetishists.

Based on advances in research and clinical practice, and major shifts in social attitudes and in relevant policies, laws, and human rights standards", the World Health Organization, on June 18, 2018, removed Fetishism, Transvestic Fetishism, and Sadomasochism as psychiatric diagnoses.

== Role in BDSM ==
Sadomasochism forms a component of BDSM, an umbrella term encompassing bondage and discipline, dominance and submission, and sadism and masochism. BDSM practices involve physical restraint, power exchange, pain, humiliation, or combinations of these elements, although pain is not involved in all BDSM activities.

Within consensual BDSM, sadomasochistic activities may involve the giving or receiving of pain, intense sensation or humiliation for pleasure. Practices vary considerably in form and intensity and include forms of impact play such as spanking, caning and whipping or genital-focused practices such as cock and ball torture. Participants may identify as sadistic, masochistic, or "switch" (performing both or changing) role.

Consent distinguishes consensual sadomasochistic activity from coercive sexual violence. The extent to which a person can legally consent to injury during BDSM varies between jurisdictions, with some legal systems restricting consent to particular forms or degrees of bodily harm.

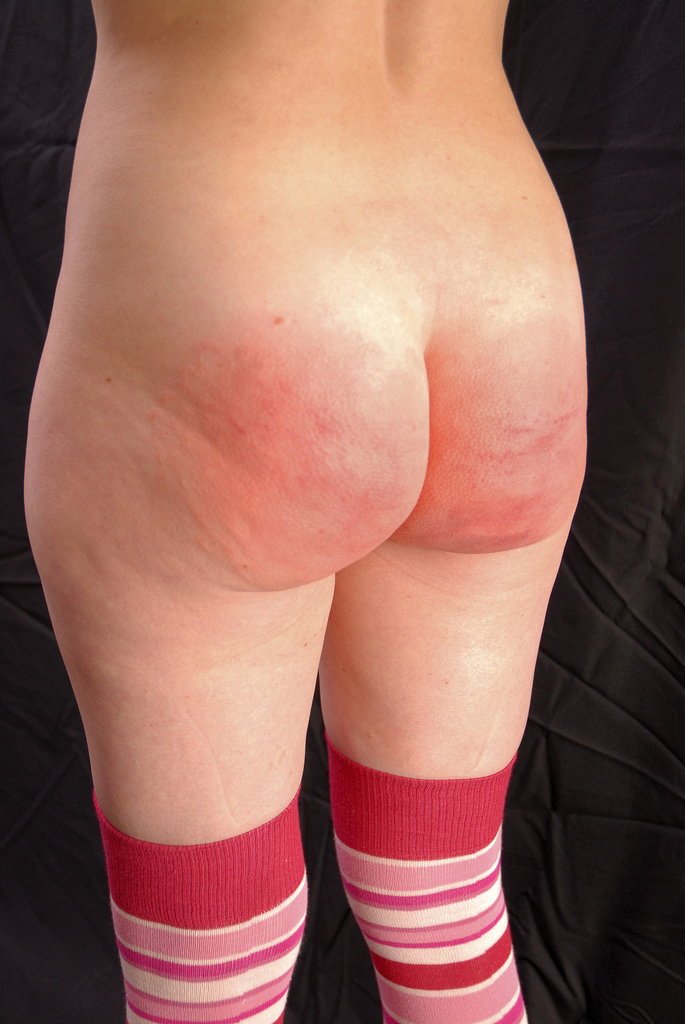
Woman's buttocks turned red as a result of a paddling.

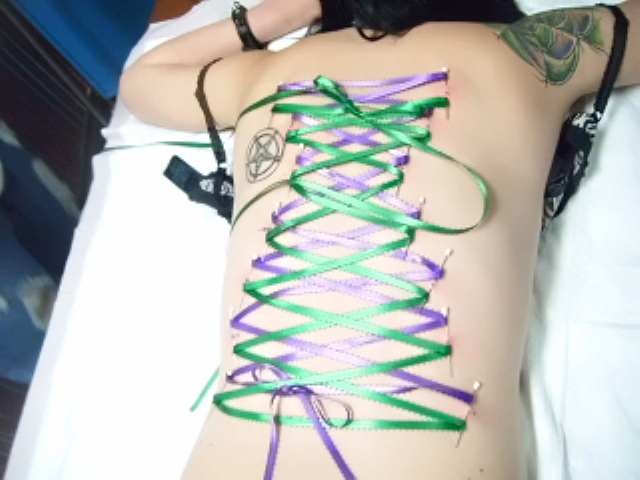
Play piercing on a woman's back using multiple needles

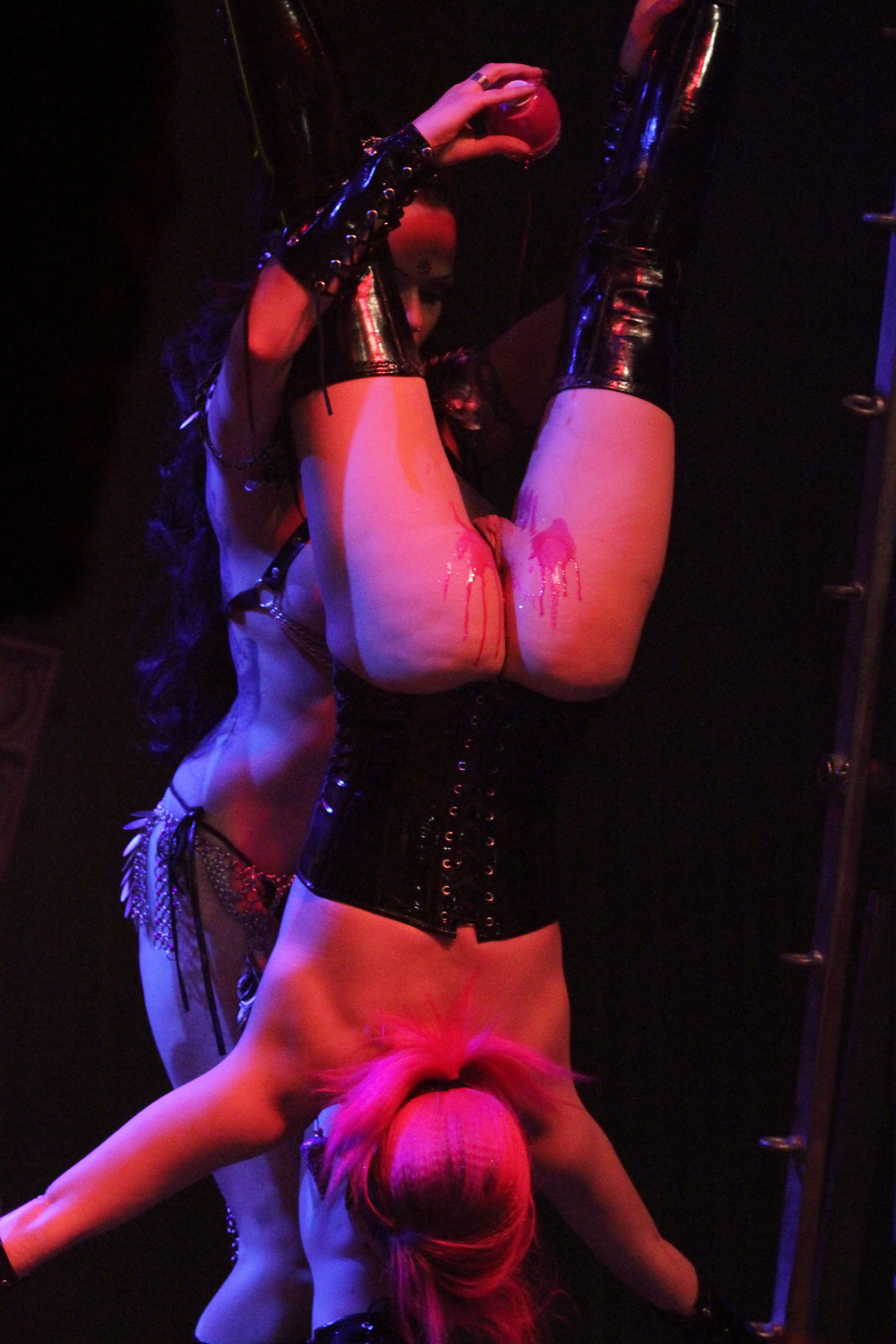
Pussy torture: wax play done on a bound nude woman's genitals at Wave-Gotik-Treffen festival, Germany, 2014.

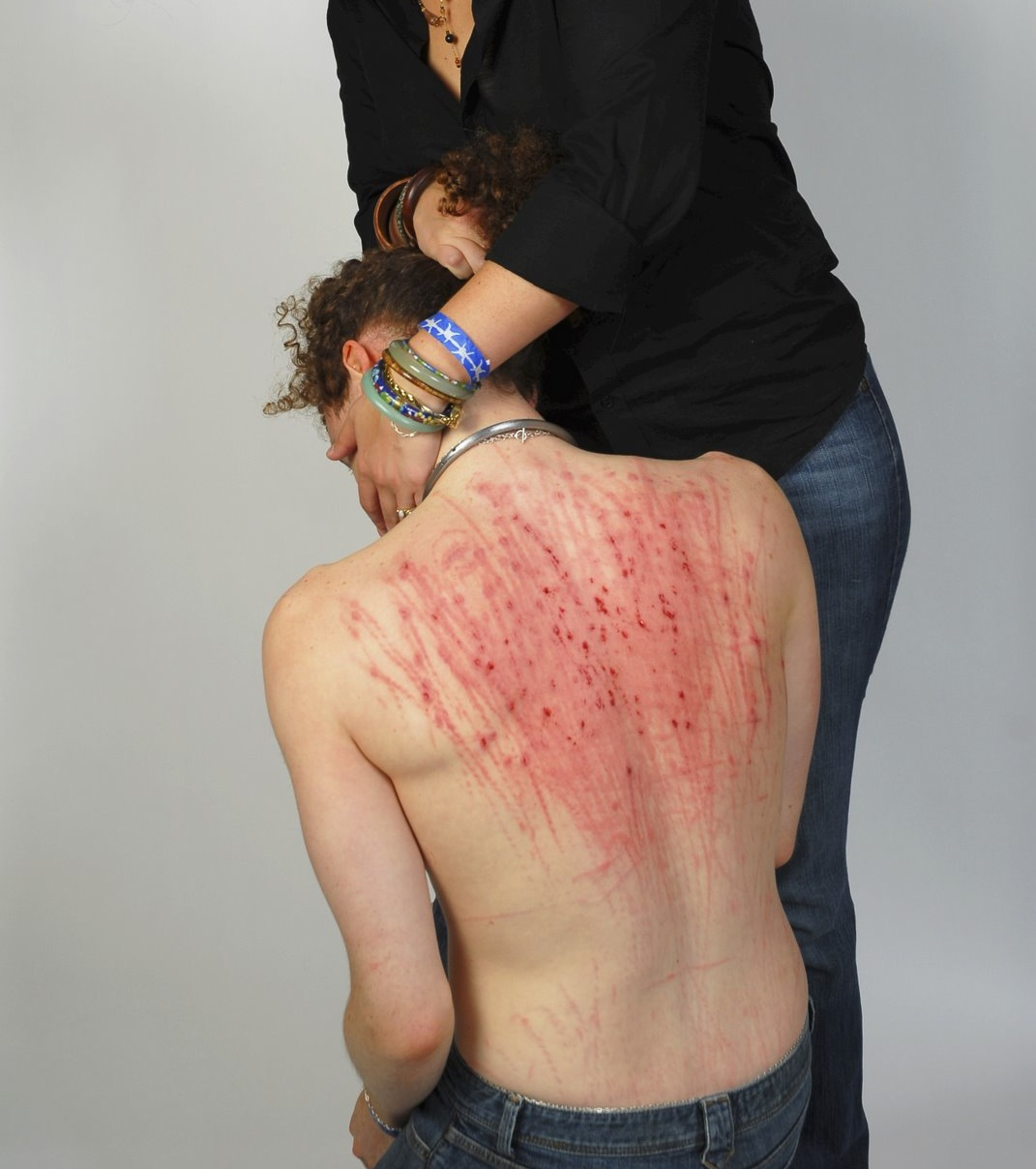
A submissive man is consoled by his dominant after she has made his back bloody by beating.

== See also ==
- Consent in BDSM
- Erotic humiliation
- Schadenfreude
- Sexual sadism disorder and Sexual masochism disorder, medical conditions where unconsenting parties are involved
- Algolagnia
