= Pietro Rossi (Hayez) =

Painting by Francesco Hayez

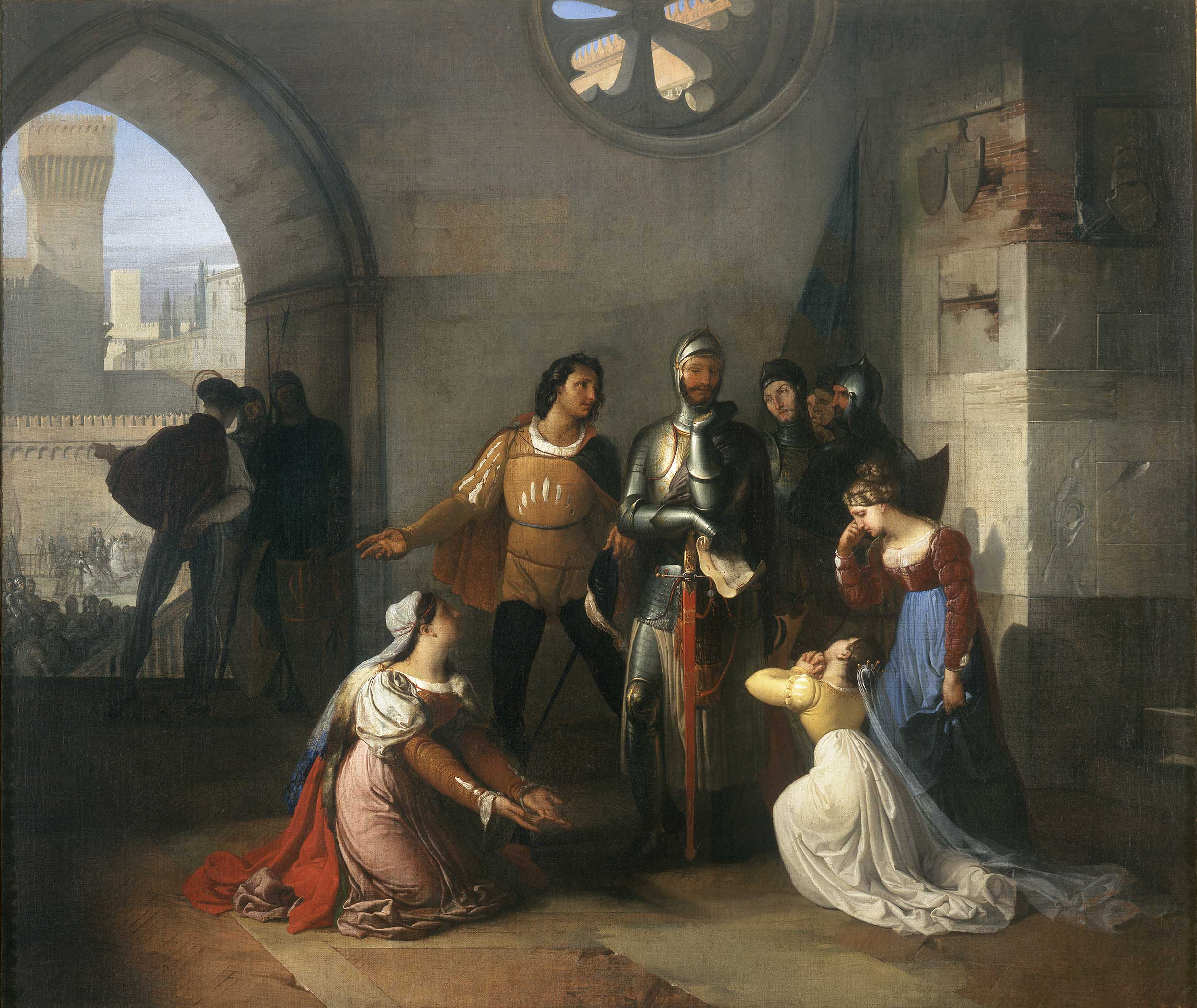
Pietro Rossi (1818–1820) by Francesco Hayez

Pietro Rossi is an oil-on-canvas painting created in 1818–1820 by the Italian artist Francesco Hayez, now in the San Fiorano collection in Milan. A copy is in the Pinacoteca di Brera, also in Milan. Both show Pietro Rossi, accepting an invitation from Francesco Dandolo via a messenger to take command of the Venetian resistance to the expansionist Scaligeri. The work links a heroic past event to contemporary events and a Romantic sensitivity, as in historical novels of the same period such as Alessandro Manzoni's 1840 The Betrothed.

The San Fiorano version was first exhibited at the Brera in 1820 under its full title Pietro Rossi, lord of Parma, despoiled of his estates by the Scaligers, lords of Verona, being sent to defend the castle of Pontremoli and to take command of the Venetian army, which was due to move against his enemies, his wife and two daughters tearfully begging him to refuse the command. There it received great acclaim thanks to its "medieval-historical" subject and its drama and emotion reinforced by a dark and shadowy palette.
