= Melancholy (Hayez) =

Painting by Francesco Hayez

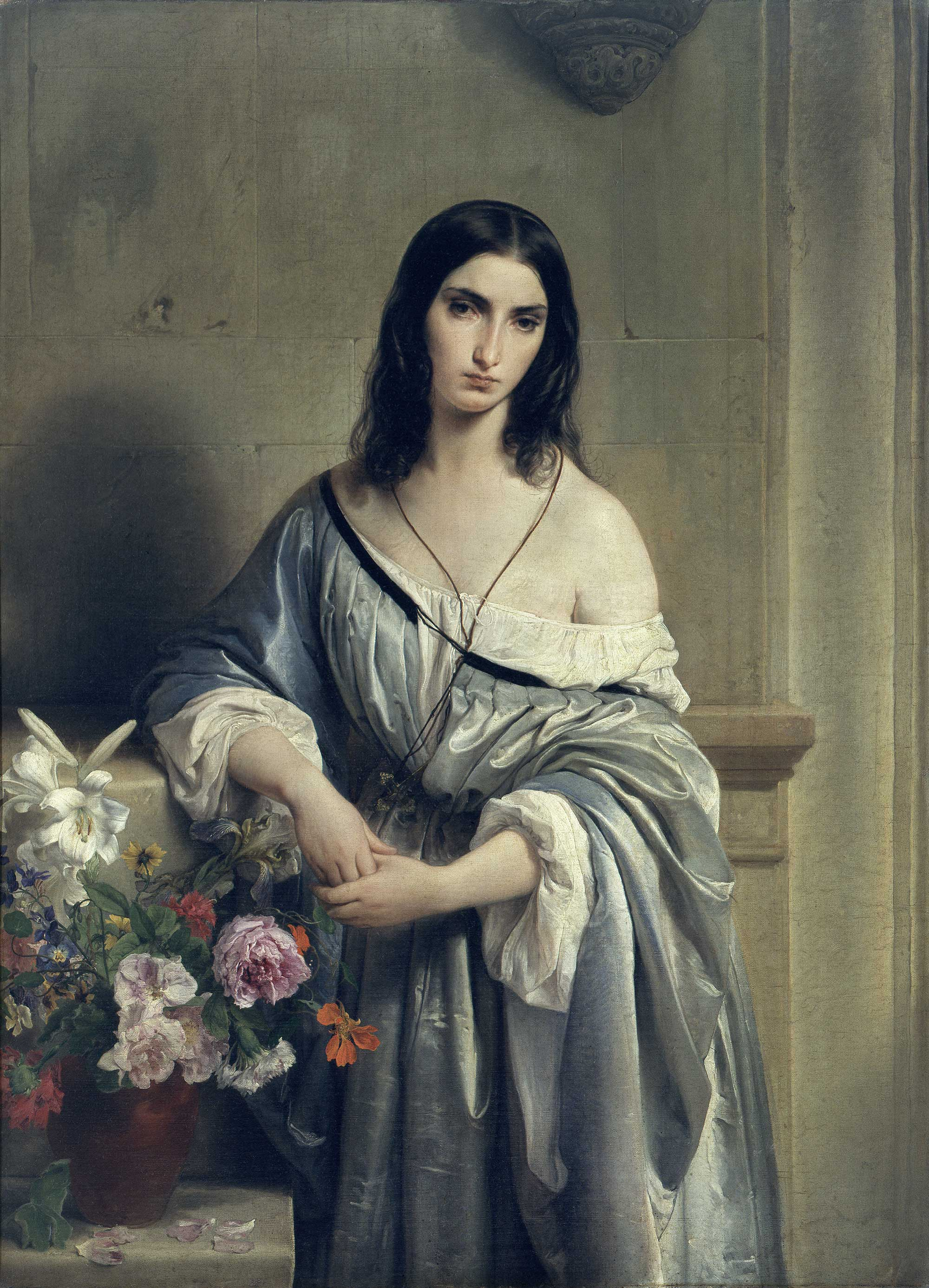
Melancholy (1840–1841) by Francesco Hayez

Melancholy is an oil-on-canvas painting executed during 1840–41 by the Italian artist Francesco Hayez, now in the pinacoteca di Brera in Milan.

The artist describes the work in his Memorie:

Melancholy is shown as a medieval young woman taken by a feeling of love, standing in an abandoned pose, who despite her passion for the flowers collected in a vase holds one in her hand, perhaps remembering the person she cares for, keeping her head somewhat bowed the better to nurture the thought which dominates her, not caring for anything around her, and her clothes falling from one shoulder, leaving part of her breast visible. The dress is in light blue satin which I thought best-suited to the subject, also because it contrasts with the live colours of the various flowers, which I painted from life with conscientious attention

The work was a popular success, leading Hayez to paint a second version, completed in 1842 and entitled Pensiero malinconico (Melancholy Thoughts). Hayez wrote in his Memorie that it had "many variations, changing the figure's character and adding flowers", reflecting the few but substantial differences from the previous work – the clothes are differently arranged, leaving the breasts more exposed and enhancing the poignant sense of abandonment, whilst the hands hang down rather than being intertwined and the face is more emotionally charged. The artist's treatment of flowers continued in his 1881 Vase of Flowers at the Window of a Harem.
