= Passive-Aggressive Notes =

Passive-Aggressive Notes was a website that documented "painfully polite and hilariously hostile notes from shared spaces the world over"; most of these spaces were shared apartments, offices, or stores.

Passive-Aggressive Notes was similar to other projects like Found Magazine and PostSecret that also collected handwritten notes, and shared a similar "blog" format (where readers sent in their own entries to the site) as the humor sites Photoshop Disasters, Not Always Right, Overheard in the ER, and Things My Mother Said.

== Purpose ==
According to the site, "for the purposes of this project, we're using a pretty broad definition of "passive-aggressive" that roughly correlates with how the term is popularly used."

As the New York Times wrote: "the classic description of the behavior captures a stubborn malcontent, someone who passively resists fulfilling routine tasks, complains of being misunderstood and underappreciated, unreasonably scorns authority and voices exaggerated complaints of personal misfortune"."

== History ==
The site was founded in May 2007, by Kerry Miller, a writer based in Brooklyn, New York.

Passive-Aggressive Notes spawned a book published by HarperCollins. In the United States and Canada, it is titled Passive-Aggressive Notes; while, in the United Kingdom and Australia, it is titled Your Mother Doesn't Work Here.
