= Passive–aggressive personality disorder =

Personality disorder

- Other names: Negativistic personality disorder
- Specialty: Psychiatry, clinical psychology
- Symptoms: Passive–aggressive behaviour, excessive suppression of expressions, compulsive procrastination

Passive–aggressive personality disorder (PAPD), also called negativistic personality disorder, is a type of personality disorder characterized by procrastination, covert obstructionism, inefficiency, and stubbornness. Passive–aggressive behavior is the obligatory symptom of the passive–aggressive personality disorder.

This disorder was included in previous editions of the Diagnostic and Statistical Manual of Mental Disorders, but it has been absent since the introduction of the DSM-5. The previous edition – the DSM-IV – describes passive–aggressive personality disorder as a proposed disorder involving a "pervasive pattern of negativistic attitudes and passive resistance to demands for adequate performance" in a variety of contexts.

== Causes ==
Passive–aggressive disorder may stem from a specific childhood stimulus (e.g., alcohol/drug addicted parents, bullying, abuse) in an environment where it was not safe to express frustration or anger. Families in which the honest expression of feelings is forbidden tend to teach children to repress and deny their feelings and to use other channels to express their frustration. For example, if physical and psychological punishment were to be dealt to children who express anger, they would be inclined to be passive–aggressive.

Children who sugarcoat hostility may have difficulties being assertive, never developing better coping strategies or skills for self-expression. They can become adults who, beneath a "seductive veneer", harbor "vindictive intent", in the words of Timothy F. Murphy and Loriann Oberlin. Alternatively, individuals may simply have difficulty being as directly aggressive or assertive as others. Martin Kantor suggests three areas that contribute to passive–aggressive anger in individuals: conflicts about dependency, control, and competition, and that a person may be termed passive–aggressive if they behave so to few people on most occasions.

== Diagnosis ==
=== DSM ===
With the publication of the DSM-5, this diagnosis has been largely disregarded. The DSM-5 equivalent would be Other specified personality disorder or Unspecified personality disorder, as the individual may meet general criteria for a personality disorder, but the condition is not included in the DSM-5 classification. The Alternative DSM-5 model for personality disorders allows for diagnosis of Personality Disorder–Trait Specified, which is applicable to manifestations of personality disorder not conforming to the six specific personality disorders included in the alternative model.

Passive–aggressive personality disorder was listed as an Axis II personality disorder in the DSM-III-R, but was moved in the DSM-IV to Appendix B ("Criteria Sets and Axes Provided for Further Study") because of controversy and the need for further research on how to also categorize the behaviors in a future edition. According to DSM-IV, people with passive–aggressive personality disorder are "often overtly ambivalent, wavering indecisively from one course of action to its opposite. They may follow an erratic path that causes endless wrangles with others and disappointment for themselves." Characteristic of these persons is an "intense conflict between dependence on others and the desire for self-assertion." Although exhibiting superficial bravado, their self-confidence is often very poor, and others react to them with hostility and negativity. This diagnosis is not made if the behavior is exhibited during a major depressive episode or can be attributed to dysthymic disorder.

=== ICD-10 ===
The 10th revision of the International Classification of Diseases (ICD-10) of the World Health Organization (WHO) includes passive–aggressive personality disorder in the other specific personality disorders rubric (description: "a personality disorder that fits none of the specific rubrics: F60.0–F60.7"). ICD-10 code for other specific personality disorders is F60.8. For this psychiatric diagnosis a condition must meet the general ICD-10 criteria for personality disorder listed under F60 in the clinical descriptions and diagnostic guidelines.

The general criteria for personality disorder includes markedly disharmonious behavior and attitudes (involving such areas of functioning as affectivity – ability to experience affects: emotions or feelings, involving ways of perceiving and thinking, impulse control, arousal, style of relating to others), the abnormal behavior pattern (enduring, of long standing), personal distress and the abnormal behavior pattern must be clearly maladaptive and pervasive. Personality disorder must appear during childhood or adolescence and continue into adulthood.

Specific diagnostic criteria of the passive–aggressive personality disorder in the "Diagnostic criteria for research" by WHO is not presented.

=== Millon's subtypes ===
The psychologist Theodore Millon has proposed four subtypes of "negativist" ("Passive–aggressive"). Any individual negativist may exhibit none or one of the following:

| Subtype | Features | Traits |
|---|---|---|
| Vacillating negativist | Including borderline features | Emotions fluctuate in bewildering, perplexing, and enigmatic ways; difficult to fathom or comprehend own capricious and mystifying moods; wavers, in flux, and irresolute both subjectively and intrapsychically. |
| Discontented negativist | Including depressive features | Grumbling, petty, testy, cranky, embittered, complaining, fretful, vexed, and moody; gripes behind pretense; avoids confrontation; uses legitimate but trivial complaints. |
| Circuitous negativist | Including antisocial and dependent features | Opposition displayed in a roundabout, labyrinthine, and ambiguous manner, e.g., procrastination, dawdling, forgetfulness, inefficiency, neglect, stubbornness, indirect and devious in venting resentment and resistant behaviors. |
| Abrasive negativist | Including sadistic features | Contentious, intransigent, fractious, and quarrelsome; irritable, caustic, debasing, corrosive, and acrimonious, contradicts and derogates; few qualms and little conscience or remorse. |

== Treatment ==
Psychiatrist Kantor suggests a treatment approach using psychodynamic, supportive, cognitive, behavioral and interpersonal therapeutic methods. These methods apply to both the passive–aggressive person and their target victim.

== History ==
The first version of the Diagnostic and Statistical Manual of Mental Disorders (DSM-I), in 1952, listed "passive–aggressive", "passive-dependent", and "aggressive" types together under "Passive–aggressive personality". The three types were seen as manifestations of the same pathology, a "psychoneurotic reaction" to anxiety.

The DSM-III-R stated in 1987 that Passive–aggressive disorder is typified by, among other things, "fail[ing] to do the laundry or to stock the kitchen with food because of procrastination and dawdling."

It was not added in the DSM-5, with contributing factors of this decision including poor evidence for the validity of the diagnosis and poor internal consistency of diagnostic criteria.

== Bibliography ==
- Kantor, Martin (2002), Passive-aggression: a guide for the therapist, the patient and the victim, Westport, CT: Praeger Publishers, ISBN 978-0-275-97422-0.
