= Schizoid personality disorder =

Personality disorder involving extreme asociality

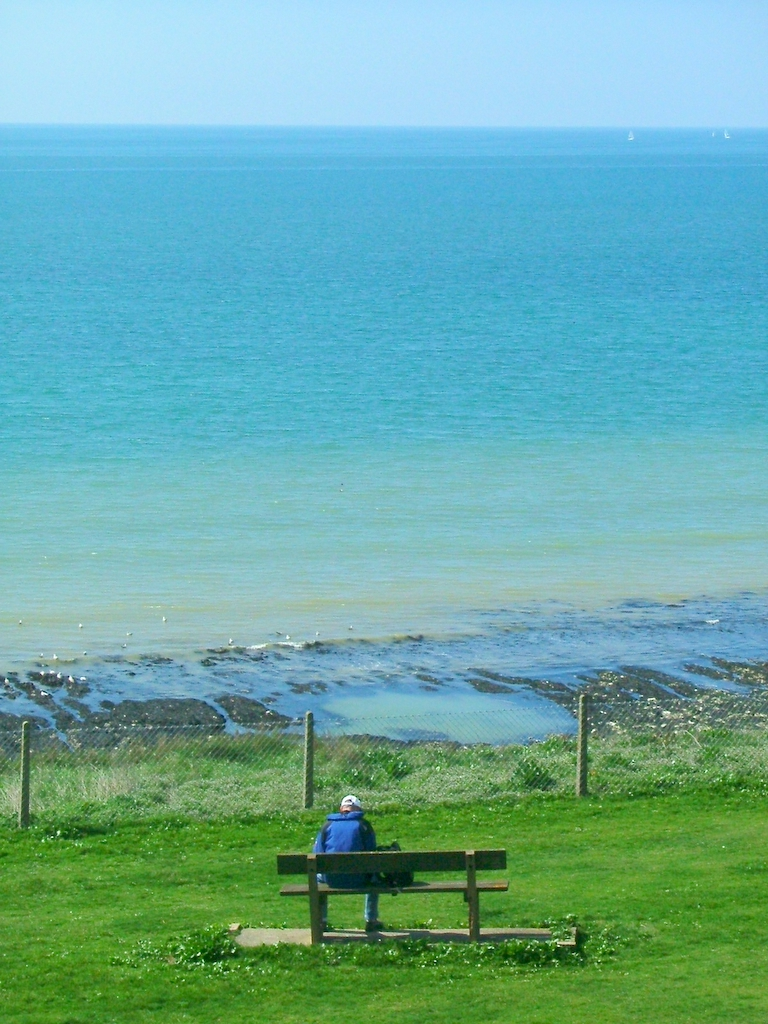
- People with schizoid personality disorder often prefer solitary activities.
- Pronunciation: /ˈskɪtsɔɪd, ˈskɪdzɔɪd, ˈskɪzɔɪd/
- Specialty: Psychiatry, clinical psychology
- Symptoms: Pervasive emotional detachment, reduced affect, lack of close friends, apathy, anhedonia, unintentional insensitivity to social norms, sexual abstinence, preoccupation with fantasy, autistic thinking without loss of skill to recognize reality
- Usual onset: Late childhood or adolescence
- Duration: Lifelong
- Types: Languid schizoid, remote schizoid, depersonalized schizoid, affectless schizoid (Millon's subtypes)
- Causes: Cold, indifferent, or intrusive parenting; traumatic brain injury; low birth weight; prenatal malnutrition
- Risk factors: Family history
- Diagnostic method: Based on symptoms
- Differential diagnosis: Other mental disorders with psychotic symptoms (schizophrenia, delusional disorder, a bipolar or depressive disorder with psychotic features, and psychotic depression), personality change due to another medical condition, substance use disorders, autism spectrum disorder, other personality disorders and personality traits (such as introversion and antisocial personality disorder)
- Treatment: Psychodynamic psychotherapy; cognitive behavioral therapy
- Medication: Not general practice but may include low dose benzodiazepines, β-blockers, nefazodone, bupropion
- Prognosis: Typically poor
- Frequency: 0.9–1.3% (median)

Schizoid personality disorder (SzPD or ScPD) is a personality disorder characterized by a lack of interest in social relationships, a tendency toward a solitary or sheltered lifestyle, reservedness, emotional coldness, detachment, and apathy. Affected individuals may be unable to form intimate attachments to others and simultaneously possess a rich and elaborate but exclusively internal fantasy world. Other associated features include stilted speech, a lack of deriving enjoyment from most activities, feeling as though one is an "observer" rather than a participant in life, an intolerance towards meeting emotional expectations of others, apparent indifference when praised or criticized, being on the asexual spectrum, and idiosyncratic moral or political beliefs.

Symptoms typically start in late childhood or adolescence. According to research, SzPD is often correlated to a neglective childhood environment, genetics and neurological conditions in the brain; although the main cause of SzPD is uncertain. Some evidence show links and shared genetic risks between SzPD, schizophrenia, and other cluster "A" personality disorders. Thus, SzPD is considered to be a "schizophrenia-like personality disorder". It is diagnosed through clinical observation, and because SzPD often share similar symptoms with other types of disorders (such as autism spectrum disorder, which symptoms may overlap with symptoms of SzPD), it can be very difficult to distinguish SzPD from other mental disorders or conditions.

The effectiveness of psychotherapeutic and pharmacological treatments for the disorder has yet to be empirically and systematically investigated. This is largely because people with SzPD rarely seek treatment for their condition. Originally, low doses of atypical antipsychotics were used to treat some symptoms of SzPD, but their use is no longer recommended. The substituted amphetamine bupropion may be used to treat associated anhedonia. However, it is not general practice to treat SzPD with medications, other than for the short-term treatment of acute co-occurring disorders (e.g. depression). Talk therapies such as cognitive behavioral therapy (CBT) may not be effective, because people with SzPD may have a hard time forming a good working relationship with a therapist.

Because SzPD is rarely encountered in clinical settings, it is therefore a poorly studied disorder, and there is little clinical data about SzPD. Studies have generally reported a prevalence of approximately less than 1%. SzPD is more commonly diagnosed in males than in females. SzPD is often linked to negative outcomes, including a poorer quality of life, reduced overall functioning even after 15 years, and one of the lowest levels of "life success" of all personality disorders (in terms of "status, wealth and successful relationships"). Bullying is particularly common towards schizoid individuals. Most SzPD individuals are likely suicidal, though they are unlikely to attempt it. Some symptoms of SzPD (e.g. solitary lifestyle, emotional detachment, loneliness, and impaired communication), however, have been stated as general risk factors for serious suicidal behavior.

== Signs and symptoms ==
=== Social isolation ===
SzPD is associated with a dismissive-avoidant attachment style. People with this disorder will rarely maintain close relationships and often exclusively choose to participate in solitary activities. People with schizoid personality disorder typically have no close friends or confidants, except for a close relative on occasions.

They usually prefer hobbies and activities that do not require interaction with others. People with SzPD may be averse to social situations due to difficulties deriving pleasure from physical or emotional sensations, rather than due to social anhedonia.

One potential motivation for avoiding social situations is that they feel that it intrudes on their freedom. Relationships can feel suffocating for people with SzPD, and they may think of them as opportunities for entrapment.

Patients with this disorder are often independent and turn to themselves as sources of validation. They tend to be the happiest when in relationships in which their partner places few emotional or intimate demands on them and does not expect phatic or social niceties. It is not necessarily people they want to avoid, but negative or positive emotional expectations, emotional intimacy, and self-disclosure.

Patients with SzPD can feel as if close emotional bonds are dangerous to themselves and others. They may have feelings of inadequacy or shame. Some people with SzPD may experience a deep desire to connect with others, yet will be terrified by the dangers inherent in doing so. Avoidance of social situations may be a method of avoiding being hurt or rejected.

Individuals with SzPD can form relationships with others based on intellectual, physical, familial, occupational, or recreational activities, as long as there is no need for emotional intimacy. Donald Winnicott explains this is because schizoid individuals "prefer to make relationships on their own terms and not in terms of the impulses of other people." Failing to attain that, they prefer isolation.

In general, friendship for schizoid individuals is usually limited to one other person, who is often also schizoid, forming what has been called a union of two eccentrics; "within it – the ecstatic cult of personality, outside it – everything is sharply rejected and despised". Their unique lifestyle can lead to social rejection and people with SzPD are at a higher risk of facing bullying or homelessness. This social rejection can reinforce their asocial behavior.

=== Sexuality ===
People with this disorder usually have little to no interest in sexual or romantic relationships; it is rare for people with SzPD to date or marry. Sex often causes individuals with SzPD to feel that their personal space is being violated, and they commonly feel that masturbation or sexual abstinence is preferable to the emotional closeness they must tolerate when having sex. Significantly broadening this picture are notable exceptions of SzPD individuals who engage in occasional or even frequent sexual activities with others. Individuals with SzPD have long been noted to have an increased rate of unconventional sexual tendencies, though if present, these are rarely acted upon. Schizoid people are often labeled asexual or present with "a lack of sexual identity". Kernberg states that this apparent lack of sexuality does not represent a lack of sexual definition but rather a combination of several strong fixations to cope with the same conflicts. People with SzPD are often able to pursue any fantasies with content on the internet while remaining completely unengaged with the outside world.

=== Emotions ===
Sensory or emotional experiences typically provide little enjoyment for people with SzPD. They rarely display strong emotions or react to anything. People with SzPD can have difficulty expressing themselves and seem to be directionless or passive. Individuals with SzPD can also experience anhedonia. They can also have difficulty understanding others' emotions and social cues.

It can be hard for people with SzPD to assess the impact of their actions in social situations. People with this condition are often indifferent to criticism or praise and can appear distant, aloof, or uncaring to others. They may avoid others and expressing themselves as a method of keeping others distant and preventing themselves from being hurt. Remaining alone and expressionless can feel safe and comfortable for people with SzPD. Expressing themselves can make them feel shame or discomfort. People with SzPD may feel inadequate and can be sensitive, although they have difficulty expressing it. Alexithymia, or difficulties understanding one's own emotions, is common amongst people with SzPD. This leads to them isolating themselves to avoid the discomfort and stimulation that emotional experiences offer.

According to Guntrip, Klein, and others, people with SzPD may possess a hidden sense of superiority and lack dependence on other people's opinions. This is very different from the grandiosity seen in narcissistic personality disorder, which is described as "burdened with envy" and with a desire to destroy or put down others. Additionally, schizoid individuals do not go out of their way to achieve social validation. Unlike narcissists, schizoid people will often keep their creations private to avoid unwelcome attention or the feeling that their ideas and thoughts are being appropriated by the public. When forced to rely on others, a person with SzPD may feel panic or terror.

=== Feelings of unreality ===
Patients with SzPD often feel unreal, empty, and separate from their own emotions. They tend to perceive themselves as fundamentally different from others and can believe that they are fundamentally unlikeable. Other people often seem strange and incomprehensible to a person with SzPD. Reality can feel unenjoyable and uninteresting to people with SzPD. They have difficulty finding motivation and lack ambition. Patients with SzPD often feel as if they are "going through the motions" or that "life passes them by." Many describe feeling as if they are observing life from a distance. Aaron Beck and his colleagues report that people with SzPD seem comfortable with their aloof lifestyle and consider themselves observers, rather than participants in the world around them. But they also mention that many of their schizoid patients recognize themselves as socially deviant (or even defective) when confronted with the different lives of ordinary people – especially when they read books or see movies focusing on relationships. Even when schizoid individuals may not long for closeness, they can become weary of being "on the outside, looking in". These feelings may lead to depression, depersonalization, or derealization. If they do, schizoid people often experience feeling "like a robot" or "going through life in a dream". People with SzPD may try to avoid all physical activity in order to become nobody and disconnect from reality. This can lead to the patient spending a large quantity of time sleeping and ignoring hygiene.

=== Internal fantasy ===
Although this disorder does not affect the patient's capacity to understand reality, they may engage in excessive daydreaming and introspection. Their daydreams can grow to consume most of their lives. Real life can become secondary to their fantasy, and they can have complex lives and relationships which exist entirely inside of their internal fantasy. These daydreams may constitute a defense mechanism to protect the patient from the outside world and its difficulties. Common themes in their internal fantasies are omnipotence and grandiosity. The related schizotypal personality disorder and schizophrenia are reported to have ties to creative thinking, and it is speculated that the internal fantasy aspect of SzPD may also be reflective of this thinking. Alternatively, there has been an especially large contribution of people with schizoid symptoms to science and theoretical areas of knowledge, including mathematics, physics, economics, etc. At the same time, people with SzPD are helpless at many practical activities because of their symptoms.

=== Suicide and self-harm ===
Symptoms of SzPD such as isolation and the blunted affect put people with schizoid personality disorder at a higher risk of suicide and non-suicidal self-harm. This may be because their reduced capacities for emotion prevent them from properly dealing with strife. Their solitary nature may contribute by preventing them from finding relief in relationships. Demonstrative suicides or suicide blackmail, as seen in cluster B personality disorders such as borderline, histrionic, or antisocial, are extremely rare among schizoid individuals. As in other clinical mental health settings, among suicidal inpatients, individuals with SzPD are not as well represented as some other groups. A 2011 study on suicidal inpatients at a Moscow hospital found that schizoid individuals were the least common patients, while those with cluster B personality disorders were the most common.

=== Low weight ===
A study that looked at the body mass index (BMI) of a sample of male adolescents diagnosed with either SzPD or Asperger syndrome found that the BMI of all patients was significantly below normal. Clinical records indicated abnormal eating behavior by some patients. Some patients would only eat when alone and refused to eat out. Restrictive diets and fears of disease were also found. It was suggested that the anhedonia of SzPD may also affect eating, leading schizoid individuals to not enjoy it. Alternatively, it was suggested that schizoid individuals may not feel hunger as strongly as others or not respond to it, a certain withdrawal "from themselves".

=== Substance abuse ===
Very little data exists for rates of substance use disorder among people with SzPD, but existing studies suggest they are less likely to have substance abuse problems than the general population. One study found that significantly fewer boys with SzPD had alcohol problems than a control group of non-schizoid people. Another study evaluating personality disorder profiles in substance abusers found that substance abusers who showed schizoid symptoms were more likely to abuse one substance rather than many, in contrast to other personality disorders such as borderline, antisocial, or histrionic, which were more likely to abuse many. American psychotherapist Sharon Ekleberry states that the impoverished social connections experienced by people with SzPD limit their exposure to the drug culture and that they have limited inclination to learn how to do illegal drugs. Describing them as "highly resistant to influence", she additionally states that even if they could access illegal drugs, they would be disinclined to use them in public or social settings, and because they would be more likely to use alcohol or cannabis alone than for social disinhibition, they would not be particularly vulnerable to negative consequences in early use. People with SzPD are at a lower risk of substance abuse issues than people with other personality disorders. They may form relationships with their substances as a substitute for human contact or to cope with emotional issues. People with SzPD may desire psychedelic drugs more than other kinds.

=== Secret schizoids ===
Many schizoid individuals display an engaging, interactive personality, contradicting the observable characteristic emphasized by the DSM-5 and ICD-10 definitions of the schizoid personality. Guntrip (using ideas of Klein, Fairbairn, and Winnicott) classifies these individuals as "secret schizoids", who behave with socially available, interested, engaged, and involved interaction yet remain emotionally withdrawn and sequestered within the safety of the internal world. Klein distinguishes between a "classic" SzPD and a "secret" SzPD, which occur "just as often" as each other. Klein cautions one should not misidentify the schizoid person as a result of the patient's defensive, compensatory interaction with the external world. He suggests one ask the person what their subjective experience is, to detect the presence of the schizoid refusal of emotional intimacy and preference for objective fact. A 2013 study looking at personality disorders and Internet use found that being online more hours per day predicted signs of SzPD. Additionally, SzPD correlated with lower phone call use and fewer Facebook friends.

Descriptions of the schizoid personality as "hidden" behind an outward appearance of emotional engagement have been recognized since 1940, with Fairbairn's description of "schizoid exhibitionism", in which the schizoid individual can express a great deal of feeling and make what appear to be impressive social contacts yet, in reality, gives nothing and loses nothing. Because they are "playing a part", their personality is not involved. According to Fairbairn, the person disowns the part they are playing, and the schizoid individual seeks to preserve their personality intact and immune from compromise. The schizoid person's false persona is based on what those around them define as normal or good behavior, as a form of compliance. Further references to the secret schizoid come from Masud Khan, Jeffrey Seinfeld, and Philip Manfield. These scholars described secret schizoids as people who enjoy public speaking engagements but experience great difficulty during the breaks when audience members would attempt to engage them emotionally. These references expose the problems in relying on outer observable behavior for assessing the presence of personality disorders in certain individuals.

== Causes ==
=== Environmental ===
Perfectionist and hypercritical parenting or cold, neglectful, and distant parenting contribute to the onset of SzPD. For a person with SzPD, their parents likely were intolerant of their emotional experiences. They may have been forced to repress and compartmentalize their emotions, possibly resulting in the onset of difficulties expressing and processing emotional experiences. These difficulties lead to the child feeling rejected and developing the belief that the only safe environment is one where they are alone and inexpressive. People with SzPD may also have internalized the belief that their emotions are dangerous to themselves and others due to the negative responses received from others. In their status of isolation and emotional bluntness they can be self-sufficient and safe. Childhood trauma can also contribute to feelings of emptiness in adulthood. Alcoholism in parents is associated with a heightened risk of developing SzPD.

=== Genetic ===
Sula Wolff, who did extensive research and clinical work with children and teenagers with schizoid symptoms, stated that "schizoid personality has a constitutional, probably genetic, basis." Research on heritability and this disorder is lacking. Twin studies with SzPD traits (e.g., low sociability and low warmth) suggest that these traits are inherited. Besides this indirect evidence, the direct heritability estimates of SzPD range from 50% to 59%. Earlier, less methodologically rigorous research had found the heritability rate to be 29%.

The pathophysiology of SzPD remains unclear. Genetic relationships with people who have schizophrenia spectrum disorders increase the risk of developing schizoid personality disorder. People with SzPD can have a history of schizotypy before developing the disorder. SzPD symptoms can be premorbid to schizophrenia.

=== Neurological ===
Prenatal malnutrition, premature birth, and low birth weight are all thought to play a role in the development of SzPD. SzPD is associated with reduced serotonergic and dopaminergic pathways in areas such as the frontal lobe, amygdala, and striatum. Traumatic brain injuries to the frontal lobe may also contribute to the onset of SzPD as that area of the brain controls areas such as emotion and socialization. Deficits in the right hemisphere of the brain may also be associated with SzPD. Lower levels of low-density lipoprotein cholesterol may be correlated with the presence of schizoid traits in women. Excess indices in the left hemisphere may also be related to SzPD.

== Diagnosis ==
=== Classification ===
Classification of personality disorders differs significantly between the two most prominent frameworks for classification of mental disorders, namely: the Diagnostic and Statistical Manual of Mental Disorders and the International Classification of Diseases, the most recent editions of which are the DSM-5-TR and ICD-11, respectively. While personality disorders, including SzPD, are diagnosed as separate entities in the DSM-5; in the ICD-11 classification of personality disorders, they are assessed in terms of severity levels, with trait and pattern specifiers serving to characterize the particular style of pathology. There is also a hybrid model, called the Alternative DSM-5 model for personality disorders (AMPD), which defines personality disorder diagnoses through disorder-specific combinations of pathological traits and areas of overall impairment.

The DSM-5-TR defines SzPD as "a pattern of detachment from social relationships and a restricted range of emotional expression" in the section II chapter on personality disorders. The diagnosis is based on the subject exhibiting at least four out of seven specified characteristics of SzPD (criterion A); furthermore, the DSM definition requires that the symptoms are present independently of any psychotic disorder or autism spectrum disorder, and they cannot stem from another medical condition (criterion B). These criteria have been retained from the DSM-IV-TR.

While not listed as its own diagnostic entity in the AMPD, what is conceptualized as SzPD can instead be diagnosed as personality disorder – trait specified, which is a dimensional diagnosis that is constructed from the individual expression of personality disorder, as manifested in both a general impairment in personality functioning along with at least one pathological personality trait.

The ICD-11 classification of personality disorders has replaced the categorical classification of personality disorders in the ICD-10 with a dimensional model containing a unified personality disorder (6D10) with severity specifiers, along with specifiers for prominent personality traits or patterns (6D11). Severity is assessed based on the pervasiveness of impairment in several areas of functioning, as well as on the level of distress and harm caused by the disorder, while trait and pattern specifiers are used for recording the manner in which the disturbance is manifested. Of these, the detachment trait domain has been found to be "substantially consistent" with Schizoid PD as described by the ICD-10, which was a standalone diagnostic category with the code (F60.1).

=== Differential diagnosis ===
==== Depression ====
People who have SzPD may also have clinical depression. However, this is not always the case. Unlike people with depression, persons with SzPD generally do not consider themselves inferior to others. They may recognize instead that they are "different".

==== Autism spectrum disorder ====
Because of overlapping traits, autism spectrum disorder (ASD) may be difficult to differentiate from the schizoid personality type. Shared characteristics include social detachment, limited emotional expression, and a preference for solitary activities.

Several factors discussed in the literature may contribute to this overlap, such as autistic individuals demonstrating increased rates of schizoid personality traits and diagnoses compared with the general population. Researchers have also reported genetic correlations between autism and schizophrenia-spectrum conditions, suggesting partial shared biological risk factors across related psychiatric traits.

The relationship between autism and schizoid traits also has historical roots in early psychiatric terminology. The term autism was originally introduced by Bleuler to describe withdrawal into inner fantasy and detachment from external reality in schizophrenia. During the mid-20th century, socially withdrawn children were often diagnosed with childhood schizophrenia before autism became recognized as a distinct developmental condition following the work of Kanner L (1943). "Autistic disturbances of affective contact". Nervous Child. 2: 217–250..

Later, Wolff S (1995). Loners: The Life Path of Unusual Children. Routledge. used the term schizoid personality in childhood to describe socially detached children with unusual behaviors and interests. Subsequent research suggested that many such cases would likely meet criteria for autism spectrum disorder under modern diagnostic frameworks.

Despite these similarities, autism differs from schizoid personality disorder in several key ways. Autism is classified as a neurodevelopmental condition that emerges in early childhood and is characterized by persistent differences in social communication as well as restricted or repetitive behaviors and sensory sensitivities. By contrast, schizoid personality disorder is defined primarily by a pervasive pattern of social detachment and restricted emotional expression that begins by early adulthood. The motivations underlying similar outward behaviors may therefore differ; individuals with schizoid personality disorder may prefer solitude, whereas autistic individuals may desire relationships but experience difficulty maintaining them.

==== Personality change due to another medical condition ====
Traits of SzPD can appear due to damage to the central nervous system.

==== Substance use disorders ====
Traits of SzPD can appear due to substance abuse.

==== Other personality disorders and personality traits ====
Schizoid and narcissistic personality disorders can seem similar in some respects (e.g. both show identity confusion, may lack warmth and spontaneity, avoid deep relationships with intimacy). Another commonality observed by Akhtar is preferring ideas over people and displaying "intellectual hypertrophy", with a corresponding lack of rootedness in bodily existence. There are, nonetheless, important differences. A schizoid person hides their need for dependency and is rather fatalistic, passive, cynical, overtly bland or vaguely mysterious. A narcissist is, in contrast, ambitious and competitive and exploits others for their dependency needs.

There are also parallels between SzPD and obsessive–compulsive personality disorder (OCPD), such as detachment, restricted emotional expression and rigidity. However, in OCPD the capacity to develop intimate relationships is usually intact, but deep contacts may be avoided because of an unease with emotions and a devotion to work.

While people affected with avoidant personality disorder (AvPD) avoid social interactions due to anxiety or feelings of incompetence, those with SzPD do so because they are genuinely indifferent to social relationships. A 1989 study, however, found that "schizoid and avoidant personalities were found to display equivalent levels of anxiety, depression, and psychotic tendencies as compared to psychiatric control patients." There also seems to be some shared genetic risk between SzPD and AvPD (see schizoid avoidant behavior). Several sources have confirmed the synonymy of SzPD and avoidant attachment style. However, the distinction should be made that individuals with SzPD characteristically do not seek social interactions merely due to lack of interest, while those with avoidant attachment style can in fact be interested in interacting with others but without establishing connections of much depth or length due to having little tolerance for any kind of intimacy.

=== Guntrip criteria ===
Ralph Klein, Clinical Director of the Masterson Institute, delineates the following nine characteristics of the schizoid personality as described by Harry Guntrip:

- Introversion
- Withdrawnness
- Narcissism
- Self-sufficiency
- A sense of superiority
- Loss of affect
- Loneliness
- Depersonalization
- Regression

The description of Guntrip's nine characteristics should clarify some differences between the traditional DSM portrait of SzPD and the traditional informed object relations view. All nine characteristics are consistent. Most, if not all, must be present to diagnose a schizoid disorder.

=== Millon's subtypes ===
Theodore Millon restricted the term "schizoid" to those personalities who lack the capacity to form social relationships. He characterizes their way of thinking as being vague and void of thoughts and as sometimes having a "defective perceptual scanning". Because they often do not perceive cues that trigger affective responses, they experience fewer emotional reactions.

For Millon, SzPD is distinguished from other personality disorders in that it is "the personality disorder that lacks a personality." He criticizes that this may be due to the current diagnostic criteria: They describe SzPD only by an absence of certain traits, which results in a "deficit syndrome" or "vacuum". Instead of delineating the presence of something, they mention solely what is lacking. Therefore, it is hard to describe and research such a concept.

He identified four subtypes of SzPD. Any schizoid individual may exhibit none or one of the following:

Subtype	Features	Traits
Languid schizoid	Including dependent and depressive features	Marked inertia; deficient activation level; intrinsically phlegmatic, lethargic, weary, leaden, lackadaisical, exhausted, enfeebled. Unable to act with spontaneity or seek simplest pleasures, may experience profound angst, yet lacking the vitality to express it strongly.
Remote schizoid	Including avoidant features	Distant and removed; inaccessible, solitary, isolated, homeless, disconnected, secluded, aimlessly drifting; peripherally occupied. Seen among people who would have been otherwise capable of developing normal emotional life but having been subjected to intense hostility lost their innate capability to form bonds. Some residual anxiety is present.
Depersonalized schizoid	Including schizotypal features	Disengaged from others and self; self is disembodied or distant object; body and mind sundered, cleaved, dissociated, disjoined, eliminated. Often seen as simply staring into the empty space or being occupied with something substantial while actually being occupied with nothing at all.
Affectless schizoid	Including compulsive features	Passionless, unresponsive, unaffectionate, chilly, uncaring, unstirred, spiritless, lackluster, unexcitable, unperturbed, cold; all emotions diminished. Combines the preference for rigid schedule (obsessive–compulsive feature) with the coldness of the schizoid.

=== Akhtar's profile ===
American psychoanalyst Salman Akhtar provided a comprehensive phenomenological profile of SzPD in which classic and contemporary descriptive views are synthesized with psychoanalytic observations. This profile is summarized in the table reproduced below that lists clinical features that involve six areas of psychosocial functioning and are organized by "overt" and "covert" manifestations.

"Overt" and "covert" are intended to denote seemingly contradictory aspects that may both simultaneously be present in an individual. These designations do not necessarily imply their conscious or unconscious existence. The covert characteristics are by definition difficult to discern and not immediately apparent. Additionally, the lack of data on the frequency of many of the features makes their relative diagnostic weight difficult to distinguish at this time. However, Akhtar states that his profile has several advantages over the DSM in terms of maintaining historical continuity of the use of the word schizoid, valuing depth and complexity over descriptive oversimplification and helping provide a more meaningful differential diagnosis of SzPD from other personality disorders.

Clinical features of schizoid personality disorder
Area	Overt characteristics	Covert characteristics
Self-concept	compliant; stoic; noncompetitive; self-sufficient; lacking assertiveness; feeling inferior and an outsider in life	cynical; inauthentic; depersonalized; alternately feeling empty, robot-like and full of omnipotent, vengeful fantasies; hidden grandiosity
Interpersonal relations	withdrawn; aloof; have few close friends; impervious to others' emotions; afraid of intimacy	exquisitely sensitive; deeply curious about others; hungry for love; envious of others' spontaneity; intensely needy of involvement with others; capable of excitement with carefully selected intimates
Social adaptation	prefer solitary occupational and recreational activities; marginal or eclectically sociable in groups; vulnerable to esoteric movements owing to a strong need to belong; tend to be lazy and indolent	lack clarity of goals; weak ethnic affiliation; usually capable of steady work; quite creative and may make unique and original contributions; capable of passionate endurance in certain spheres of interest
Love and sexuality	asexual, sometimes celibate; free of romantic interests; averse to sexual gossip and innuendo	secret voyeuristic interests; vulnerable to erotomania; tendency towards compulsive perversions
Ethics, standards, and ideals	idiosyncratic moral and political beliefs; tendency towards spiritual, mystical and para-psychological interests	moral unevenness; occasionally strikingly amoral and vulnerable to odd crimes, at other times altruistically self-sacrificing
Cognitive style	absent-minded; engrossed in fantasy; vague and stilted speech; alternations between eloquence and inarticulateness	autistic thinking; fluctuations between sharp contact with external reality and hyperreflectiveness about the self; autocentric use of language

== Treatment ==
=== Medication ===
There are no medications used specifically for schizoid personality disorder. Certain medications may reduce the symptoms of SzPD and treat co-occurring mental disorders. Since the symptoms of SzPD mirror the negative symptoms of schizophrenia, antipsychotics have been suggested as a potentially effective medication for SzPD. Originally, low doses of atypical antipsychotics like risperidone or olanzapine were used to alleviate social deficits and blunted affect. SSRIs, anxiolytics, bupropion, modafinil, benzodiazepines, and biofeedback may also be effective treatments.

=== Psychotherapy ===
Basic tenets of Cognitive-Behavioral Therapy, a kind of Psychotherapy used to treat SzPD

Treatment for this disorder uses a combination of cognitive-behavioral therapy and psychodynamic psychotherapy. Recently other integrated treatments have been tested, albeit on very limited samples, such as evolutionary systems therapy. These techniques can be used to help patients identify their defense mechanisms and change them. Therapists attempt to establish healthy relationships with their clients, helping to combat their internalized belief that relationships are harmful and unhelpful. Relationships with a therapist can seem terrifying and intrusive to a person with SzPD. They may feel as if they need to alter or hide their feelings to meet the therapist's demands or expectations. To combat this, therapists try to gradually increase their patient's emotional expression. Expressing too much too early can lead to their ending therapy. Treatment must be person centered, with clients feeling understood and well regarded. This can allow them to connect with and understand their emotions. When people with SzPD do not have their feelings validated, this will confirm their belief that expressing themselves is dangerous. Therapists attempt to avoid intruding on their patients' lives or restricting their freedoms, so as to prevent them from feeling as if therapy is intolerable. Because of this, therapy is usually less structured than treatment programs for other disorders. Patients may benefit from long-term treatment lasting several years. Inpatient care may be effective for treating SzPD and other Cluster A disorders.

== Prognosis ==
Traits of schizoid personality disorder appear in childhood and adolescence. Children with this disorder usually have poor relationships with others, social anxiety, internal fantasies, strange behavior, and hyperactivity. These behaviors can result in teasing and bullying at the hands of others. It is common for people with SzPD to have had major depressive disorder in childhood. SzPD is associated with lower levels of achievement, a compromised quality of life, and a worse outcome of treatment. Treatment for this disorder is under-studied and poorly understood. There is no widely accepted and approved psychotherapy or medication for this disorder. It is one of the most poorly researched psychiatric disorders. Professionals may misunderstand the disorder and the client, potentially reinforcing a feeling of failure and negatively impacting their willingness to continue to commit to treatment. Clinicians tend to worry that they are incapable of properly treating the patient. It is rare for someone with this disorder to voluntarily seek treatment without a comorbid disorder or pressure from family or friends. In treatment, people with SzPD are usually disinterested and often minimize symptoms. Patients with SzPD may fear losing their independence through therapy. Many schizoid individuals will avoid making the efforts required to establish a proper relationship with the therapist. It can be difficult for them to open up or discuss their emotions in therapy. Although people with this disorder can still improve, it is unlikely they will ever experience significant joy through social interaction.

== Epidemiology ==
It remains unclear how prevalent the disorder is. It may be present in anywhere from 0.9% to 1.3% and possibly 3.1% of the population. Gender differences in this disorder are also unclear. Some research has suggested that this disorder may occur more frequently in men than women. SzPD is uncommon in clinical settings (about 2.2%) and occurs more commonly in males. It is rare compared with other personality disorders. Philip Manfield suggests that the "schizoid condition", which roughly includes the DSM schizoid, avoidant and schizotypal personality disorders, is represented by "as many as forty percent of all personality disorders." Manfield adds: "This huge discrepancy [from the ten percent reported by therapists for the condition] is probably largely because someone with a schizoid disorder is less likely to seek treatment than someone with other axis-II disorders." A 2008 study assessing personality and mood disorder prevalence among homeless people at New York City drop-in centers reported an SzPD rate of 65% among this sample. The study did not assess homeless people who did not show up at drop-in centers, and the rates of most other personality and mood disorders within the drop-in centers were lower than that of SzPD. The authors noted the limitations of the study, including the higher male-to-female ratio in the sample and the absence of subjects outside the support system or receiving other support (e.g., shelters) as well as the absence of subjects in geographical settings outside New York City, a large city often considered a magnet for disenfranchised people.

=== Comorbid disorders ===
- Agoraphobia
- Avoidant personality disorder
- Borderline personality disorder
- Post-traumatic stress disorder
- Major depressive disorder
- Generalized anxiety disorder
- Panic disorder
- Paranoid personality disorder
- Social anxiety disorder
- Schizotypal personality disorder
- Obsessive–compulsive disorder

==== Autism spectrum disorder ====
Several studies have reported an overlap or comorbidity with autism spectrum disorder and Asperger syndrome. Asperger syndrome had traditionally been called "schizoid disorder of childhood", and Eugen Bleuler coined both the terms "autism" and "schizoid" to describe withdrawal to an internal fantasy, against which any influence from outside becomes an intolerable disturbance. In a 2012 study of a sample of 54 young adults with Asperger syndrome, it was found that 26% of them also met the criteria for SzPD, the highest comorbidity out of any personality disorder in the sample (the other comorbidities were 19% for obsessive–compulsive personality disorder, 13% for avoidant personality disorder and one female with schizotypal personality disorder). Additionally, twice as many men with Asperger syndrome met the criteria for SzPD than women. While 41% of the whole sample were unemployed with no occupation, this rose to 62% for the Asperger's and SzPD comorbid group. Tantam suggested that Asperger syndrome may confer an increased risk of developing SzPD. A 2019 study found that 54% of a group of males aged 11 to 25 with Asperger syndrome showed significant SzPD traits, with 6% meeting full diagnostic criteria for SzPD, compared to 0% of a control group.

In the 2012 study, it was noted that the DSM may complicate diagnosis by requiring the exclusion of a pervasive developmental disorder (PDD) before establishing a diagnosis of SzPD. The study found that social interaction impairments, stereotyped behaviors, and specific interests were more severe in the individuals with Asperger syndrome also fulfilling SzPD criteria, against the notion that social interaction skills are unimpaired in SzPD. The authors believe that a substantial subgroup of people with autism spectrum disorder or PDD have clear "schizoid traits" and correspond largely to the "loners" in Lorna Wing's classification The autism spectrum (Lancet 1997), described by Sula Wolff. The authors of the 2019 study hypothesized that it is extremely likely that historic cohorts of adults diagnosed with SzPD either also had childhood-onset autistic syndromes or were misdiagnosed. They stressed that further research to clarify overlap and distinctions between these two syndromes was strongly warranted, especially given that high-functioning autism spectrum disorders are now recognized in around 1% of the population.

== History ==
The term schizoid is widely thought to be coined in 1908 by Eugen Bleuler to describe a human tendency to direct attention toward one's inner life and away from the external world. In the fourth edition of his textbook, Bleuler describes these personalities as "comfortably dull and at the same time sensitive, people who in a narrow manner pursue vague purposes". This description echoes Bleuler's 1911 description of a personality pathology functionally related to schizophrenia, as described in his seminal work, Dementia Praecox or the Group of Schizophrenias.

August Hoch in 1910 introduced a very similar concept called the "shut-in" personality. Characteristics of it were reticence, reclusiveness, shyness and a preference for living in fantasy worlds, among others. In 1925, Russian psychiatrist Grunya Sukhareva described a "schizoid psychopathy" in a group of children, resembling today's SzPD and ASD. About a decade later Pyotr Gannushkin also included Schizoids and Dreamers in his detailed typology of personality types.

It has been argued that descriptive tradition began in 1925 with the description of observable schizoid behaviors by Kretschmer. However, various theorist prior to Kretschmer described observable behaviours characteristic of schizoid personality as conceptualized by the early descriptive tradition, including Karl Kahlbaum in 1890, Emil Kraepelin in 1902 and 1919, Bleuler in 1911 and 1920, and Adolf Meyer in 1906, 1908, and 1912. Nevertheless, Kretschmer's seminal work involving schizoid personality, Physique and Character, was highly influential and constituted the most robust description of observable schizoid behaviours, and was notably descriptive for setting forth classifications based on these observable behaviours. However, it would be in error to claim that Kretschmer was operating solely from the descriptive tradition.

In Physique and Character, and under a specific influence of the Bleuler school, which Kretschmer failed to properly credit, the schizoid is organized into three characteristic groups:

1. Unsociability, quietness, reservedness, seriousness and eccentricity.
2. Timidity, shyness with feelings, sensitivity, nervousness, excitability, fondness of nature and books.
3. Pliability, kindliness, honesty, indifference, silence and cold emotional attitudes.

These characteristics are thought to be precursors of the DSM-III subcategorization of the schizoid character into three distinct personality disorders: schizotypal, avoidant and schizoid. However, Kretschmer's divisions were dimensional, and Kretschmer himself did not conceive of separating these behaviors to the point of radical isolation but considered them to be simultaneously present as varying potentials in schizoid individuals. For Kretschmer, the majority of schizoid people are not either oversensitive or cold, but they are oversensitive and cold "at the same time" in quite different relative proportions, with a tendency to move along these dimensions from one behavior to the other. Though Krestchmer notes that as a schizoid individual ages, she tends to become more anaclitic. Moreover, as per Bleuler's various works on the fundamental features of schizophrenia, this "split" in temperamental characteristics was thought by Kretschmer to be a fundamental, defining feature of schizoid personality.

The second path to schizoid personality, that of dynamic psychiatry, began in 1924 with the influence of observations by descriptive psychiatrist Eugen Bleuler, who observed that the schizoid person and schizoid pathology were not things to be set apart, though Bleuler argued for this earlier, on schizophrenic diseases more generally, in Dementia Praecox or the Group of Schizophrenias. In addition, Bleuler himself was strongly influenced by earlier dynamic theorists, such as Sigmund Freud on the "day-dreamer" in 1908 and on secondary narcissism in 1914, and Carl Jung on introversion in 1917. Later, under the influence of Bleuler and others, Ronald Fairbairn's seminal work on the schizoid condition, which was divided into schizophrenia proper; the schizoid personality type; the schizoid character; and transient schizoid episodes, and from which most of what is known today about psychodynamic schizoid phenomena is derived, was presented in 1940. Here, Fairbairn delineated four central schizoid themes:

1. The need to regulate interpersonal distance as a central focus of concern.
2. The ability to mobilize self-preservative defenses and self-reliance.
3. A pervasive tension between the anxiety-laden need for attachment and the defensive need for distance that manifests in observable behavior as indifference.
4. An overvaluation of the inner world at the expense of the outer world.

Following Fairbairn's derivation of SzPD from a combination of derealization, depersonalization, splitting, the oral stage of making all subjects into partial objects, and intellectualization; the dynamic psychiatry tradition has continued to produce rich explorations on the schizoid character, most notably from writers Nannarello (1953), Laing (1965), Winnicott (1965), Guntrip (1969), Khan (1974), Akhtar (1987), Seinfeld (1991), Manfield (1992) and Klein (1995).

The DSM-I had the diagnosis of schizoid personality, which was defined by avoidance of close relationships, inability to express aggressive feelings, and autistic thinking (thinking which is preoccupied with one's inner experience). The DSM-II later updated the definition to include daydreaming, detachment from reality, and sensitivity. It was incorporated into the DSM-III as schizoid personality disorder to describe difficulties forming meaningful social relationships and a persistent pattern of disconnection and apathy. The diagnosis of SzPD made it to the DSM-IV and DSM-V.

== Controversy ==
The original concept of the schizoid character developed by Ernst Kretschmer in the 1920s comprised a mix of avoidant, schizotypal, and schizoid traits. It was not until 1980 and the work of Theodore Millon that led to splitting this concept into three personality disorders (now schizoid, schizotypal, and avoidant). This caused debate about whether this was accurate or if these traits were different expressions of a single personality disorder. It has also been argued due to the poor consistency and efficiency of diagnosis due to overlapping traits that SzPD should be removed altogether from the DSM. A 2012 article suggested that two different disorders may better represent SzPD: one affect-constricted disorder (belonging to schizotypal PD) and a seclusive disorder (belonging to avoidant PD). They called for the replacement of the SzPD category from future editions of the DSM with a dimensional model which would allow for the description of schizoid traits on an individual basis.

Some critics such as Nancy McWilliams of Rutgers University and Panagiotis Parpottas of European University Cyprus argue that the definition of SzPD is flawed due to cultural bias and that it does not constitute a mental disorder but simply an avoidant attachment style requiring a more distant emotional proximity. If that is true, then many of the more problematic reactions these individuals show in social situations may be partly accounted for by the judgments commonly imposed on people with this style.

Similarly, John Oldham, using a dimensional approach, thinks that most people with schizoid character features do not have a full-blown personality disorder. Impairment is mandatory for any behavior to be diagnosed as a personality disorder.

== See also ==
- Alexithymia
- Asociality
- Cognitive disengagement syndrome
- Counterphobic attitude
- Dissociation (psychology)
- Extraversion and introversion
- Hermit
- Hikikomori
- Recluse
- Schizothymia
- Schizotypy
- Social disorder
- Social isolation
- Schizoid avoidant behavior
- Schizotypal personality disorder
