= Pietromonaco =

Pietromonaco is a surname. Notable people with the name include:

- Don Pietromonaco (1935–1997), American actor and radio personality
- Paula R. Pietromonaco, American psychologist
