= Schizoid avoidant behavior =

Relationship in clinical psychology

The relationship between schizoid personality disorder (SzPD) and avoidant personality disorder (AvPD) has been a subject of controversy for decades.

Today it is still unclear and remains to be seen if these two personality disorders are genuinely distinct, but overlapping, personality disorders, or if they are merely two different phenotypic expressions of the same underlying disorder. Both have been associated with a shared genetic risk factor and the same polymorphism within the ANKK1 gene. There is also some evidence that AvPD (like SzPD) is a personality disorder of the schizophrenia spectrum.

Originally, schizoid personality disorder involved social avoidance combined with marked ambivalence regarding the desirability of social contact. It included indifference or even cold disdain oscillating with longing for normal relationships. Through the efforts of Theodore Millon, this complex idea was later divided across two disorders with the emergence of a separate AvPD construct and the idea of ambivalence was lost.

According to the differential diagnosis guidelines provided in the text of the DSM-IV the two conditions are distinguished by the extent to which the individual desires social contact versus being indifferent to it. But such distinctions are often difficult to apply in practice, as patients often have unclear, marginal, or shifting status on those elements thought most crucial for differential diagnosis. In the case of the avoidant and schizoid PDs, however, both the problem and its solution may be more academic than real. First, research indicates that all of the avoidant symptoms except social withdrawal correlate negatively with the schizoid symptom list and that differential diagnosis is not difficult. Second, as pointed out by Benjamin (1993), schizoid PD is exceedingly rare and the diagnostic quandary may never occur in practice.

However, new research shows that both PDs are linked to hypersensitivity.

== See also ==
- Counterdependency
