= Harry Guntrip =

British psychoanalyst and Congregationalist minister (1901–1975)

Henry James Samuel Guntrip (29 May 1901 – 18 February 1975) was a British psychoanalyst known for his major contributions to the object relations theory of Freudian thought. He was a Fellow of the British Psychological Society and a psychotherapist and lecturer at the Department of Psychiatry, Leeds University, and also a Congregationalist minister. He was described by Jock Sutherland as "one of the psychoanalytic immortals".

== Work ==
Guntrip's Personality Structure and Human Interaction organised, critiqued and synthesised the theories of major psychoanalysts, including Melanie Klein, Ronald Fairbairn, D. W. Winnicott, and Michael Balint. Although he accepted many of Freud's theories, he also advanced his own ideas and criticised Freud as being too based on biology in general, and instincts in particular, and therefore being, in Guntrip's belief, dehumanising. He also drew heavily on the object relational approach of Fairbairn and Winnicott. He argued that the regressed ego, which is perhaps his greatest contribution to psychoanalysis, exerts a powerful effect on life. He viewed the schizoid sense of emptiness as reflecting the withdrawal of energy from the real world into a world of internal object relations.

His own schizoid symptoms led him to be psychoanalysed by both W.R.D. Fairbairn and D.W. Winnicott. Although helpful, the therapy did not cure his problem.

== On the schizoid personality ==
Guntrip worked extensively with schizoid patients who were detached, withdrawn, and unable to form meaningful human relations. He came to regard the self as the fundamental psychological concept, psychoanalysis as the study of its growth, and psychoanalytic therapy as a means of providing a personal relationship in which the alienated, withdrawn self is given an opportunity for healthy growth and development, and finally putting it in touch with other persons and objects.

He delineated the following nine characteristics of the schizoid personality: introversion, withdrawnness, narcissism, self-sufficiency, a sense of superiority, loss of affect, loneliness, depersonalisation, and regression. These are described in more detail below.

=== Introversion ===
Guntrip described the schizoid's inner world thus: "By the very meaning of the term, the schizoid is described as cut off from the world of outer reality in an emotional sense. All this libidinal desire and striving is directed inward toward internal objects and he lives an intense inner life often revealed in an astonishing wealth and richness of fantasy and imaginative life whenever that becomes accessible to observation. Though mostly his varied fantasy life is carried on in secret, hidden away." The schizoid person is so cut off from outer reality as to experience it as dangerous. It is a natural human response to turn away from sources of danger and toward sources of safety. The schizoid individual, therefore, is primarily concerned with avoiding danger and ensuring safety.

=== Withdrawnness ===
Withdrawnness means detachment from the outer world, the other side of introversion. Only a small portion of schizoid individuals present with a clear and obvious timidity, reluctance, or avoidance of the external world and interpersonal relationships. Many fundamentally schizoid people present with an engaging, interactive personality style.

Such a person can appear to be available, interested, engaged and involved in interacting with others, but he or she may in reality be emotionally withdrawn and sequestered in a safe place in an internal world. Withdrawnness is a characteristic feature of schizoid pathology, but it is sometimes overt and sometimes covert. Overt withdrawnness matches the usual description of the schizoid personality, but withdrawnness is just as often a covert, hidden, internal state of the patient.

The patient's observable behaviour may not accurately reflect the internal state of their mind. One should not mistake introversion for indifference, and one should not miss identifying the schizoid patient due to misinterpretation of the patient's defensive, compensatory, engaging interaction with external reality.

=== Narcissism ===
Guntrip defines narcissism as "a characteristic that arises out of the predominantly interior life the schizoid lives. His love objects are all inside him and moreover he is greatly identified with them so that his libidinal attachments appear to be in himself. The question, however, is whether the intense inner life of the schizoid is due to a desire for hungry incorporation of external objects or due to withdrawal from the outer to a presumed safer inner world." The need for attachment as a primary motivational force is as strong in the schizoid person as in any other human being. Because the schizoid's love objects are internal, they find safety without connecting and attaching to objects in the real world (see Narcissistic defences).

=== Self-sufficiency ===
Guntrip observed that a sense of superiority accompanies self-sufficiency. "One has no need of other people, they can be dispensed with... There often goes with it a feeling of being different from other people." The sense of superiority of the schizoid has nothing to do with the grandiose self of the narcissistic disorder. It does not find expression in the schizoid through the need to devalue or annihilate others who are perceived as offending, criticising, shaming, or humiliating. This type of superiority was described by a young schizoid man:

"If I am superior to others, if I am above others, then I do not need others. When I say that I am above others, it does not mean that I feel better than them, it means that I am at a distance from them, a safe distance."

It is a feeling of security rather than of superiority.

=== Loss of affect ===
Guntrip saw loss of affect as inevitable, as the tremendous investment made in the self interferes with the desire and ability to be empathic and sensitive toward another person's experience. These things often seem secondary to securing one's own defensive, safe position. The subjective experience is one of loss of affect.

Some patients experience loss of affect to such a degree that the insensitivity becomes manifest in the extreme as cynicism, callousness, or even cruelty. The patient appears to have no awareness of how his or her comments or actions affect and hurt other people. This loss of affect is more frequently manifest within the patient as genuine confusion, a sense of something missing in his or her emotional life.

=== Loneliness ===
Guntrip observed that the preceding characteristics result in loneliness: "Loneliness is an inescapable result of schizoid introversion and abolition of external relationships. It reveals itself in the intense longing for friendship and love which repeatedly break through. Loneliness in the midst of a crowd is the experience of the schizoid cut off from affective rapport." This is a central experience of the schizoid that is often lost to the observer. Contrary to the familiar caricature of the schizoid as uncaring and cold, the vast majority of schizoid persons who become patients express at some point in their treatment their longing for friendship and love. This is not the schizoid patient as described in the DSMs. Such longing, however, may not break through except in the schizoid's fantasy life, to which the therapist may not be allowed access for quite a long period in treatment, if ever.

There is a very narrow range of classic DSM-defined schizoids for whom the hope of establishing relationships is so minimal as to be almost extinct. The longing for closeness and attachment is almost unidentifiable to such a person. These individuals will not voluntarily become patients, as the schizoid individual who becomes a patient does so often because of the twin motivations of loneliness and longing. This type of patient believes that some kind of connection and attachment is possible and is well suited to psychotherapy. The psychotherapist, however, may approach the schizoid patient with a sense of therapeutic pessimism, if not nihilism, and may misread the patient by believing that the patient's wariness is indifference and that caution is coldness.

=== Depersonalization ===
Guntrip describes depersonalization as a loss of a sense of identity and individuality. Depersonalization is a dissociative defence, often described by the schizoid patient as "tuning out", "turning off", or as the experience of a separation between the observing and the participating ego. It is experienced most profoundly when anxieties seem overwhelming and is a more extreme form of loss of affect: whereas the loss of affect is a more chronic state in schizoid personality disorder, depersonalisation is an acute defence against more immediate experiences of overwhelming anxiety or danger.

=== Regression ===
Guntrip defined regression as "Representing the fact that the schizoid person at bottom feels overwhelmed by their external world and is in flight from it both inwards and as it were backwards to the safety of the metaphorical womb." Such a process of regression encompasses two different mechanisms: inward and backwards. Regression inward speaks to the magnitude of the reliance on primitive forms of fantasy and self-containment, often of an autoerotic or even objectless nature. Regression backwards to the safety of the womb is a unique schizoid phenomenon and represents the most intense form of schizoid defensive withdrawal in an effort to find safety and to avoid destruction by external reality, which has been conflated with the challenging parental models faced by the subject following exit from the womb upon physical birth. The fantasy of regression to the womb is the fantasy of regression to a place of ultimate safety.

== Published works ==
- Schizoid Phenomena, Object-Relations, and the Self (1968). Karnac Books. ISBN 1-85575-032-5
- Psychoanalytic Theory, Therapy, and the Self: A Basic Guide to the Human Personality in Freud, Erikson, Klein, Sullivan, Fairbairn, Hartmann, Jacobson, and Winnicott (1971). Karnac Books. ISBN 0-946439-15-X
- Personality Structure and Human Interaction (1961). Karnac Books. ISBN 1-85575-118-6
- Psychology for Ministers and Social Workers (1949)
- You and Your Nerves
- Mental Pain and the Cure of Souls
- Middle Age (with L. J. Tizard)
