= Grunya Sukhareva =

Soviet psychiatrist and educator (1891–1981)

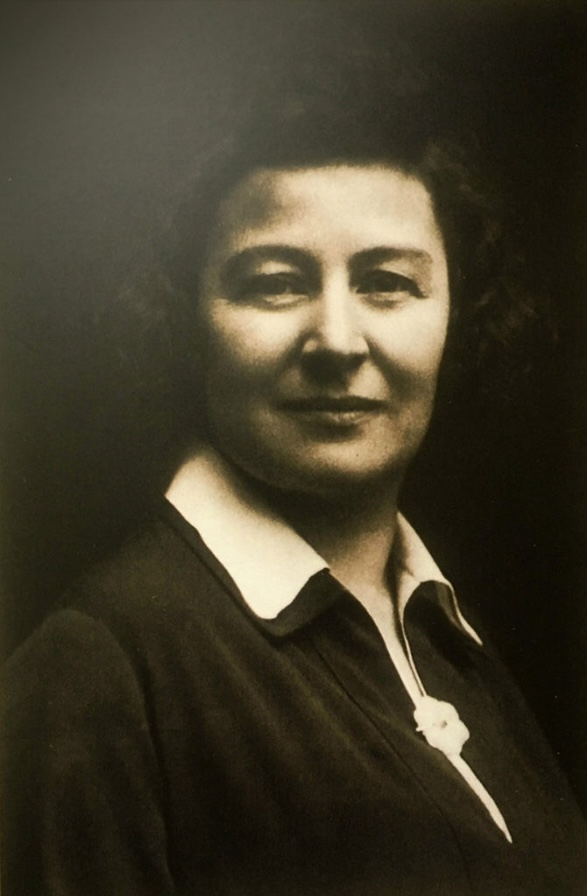
- Sukhareva in 1928
- Born: Grunya Yefimovna Sukhareva; 11 November 1891; Kyiv, Russian Empire
- Died: 26 April 1981 (aged 89); Moscow, RSFSR, Soviet Union
- Education: Kyiv Women's Medical Institute
- Known for: Writing on autism
- Medical career
- Profession: Child psychiatrist
- Institutions: Central Institute of Advanced Medical Studies
- Sub-specialties: Pediatrics
- Research: Autism

Grunya Yefimovna Sukhareva (Груня Ефимовна Сухарева, [ˈɡrunʲə jɪˈfʲiməvnə ˈsuxərʲɪvə], alternative transliteration Suchareva) (11 November 1891 – 26 April 1981) was a Soviet child psychiatrist and the first psychiatrist to identify and pathologize autism.

== Biography ==
Grunya Yefimovna Sukhareva was born to parents Khaim Faitelevich and Rakhila Iosifovna Sukhareva on November 11th, 1891 in Kyiv, Russian Empire. She studied medicine at the Kyiv Medical Institute, and in 1915, earned her medical degree. She then began working at the institute's epidemiological unit until 1917, when she started working as a licensed psychiatrist at the Kyiv Psychiatric Hospital until 1921. She served as Head of the Defectology Department at the Institute of Mental Health of Children and Adolescents from 1919 until her departure in 1921.

In 1921, Sukhareva moved to Moscow, where she was employed at the Psychoneurological Department for Children. It was here that Sukhareva founded a school — the first of many that she would found throughout her career — and named it the Psycho-Neurological and Pedagogical Sanatorium School of the Institute of Physical Training and Medical Pedology. At the Sanatorium School, Sukhareva conducted her groundbreaking research on autism in children through clinical observations of students under her care, which served as the foundation of her seminal 1925 publication (as well as proceeding publications) regarding the condition known today as Autism Spectrum Disorder. Sukhareva's tenacity for psychiatric research and development fueled her expansive contributions in the field, with over 150 papers published in her lifetime, alongside several textbooks and other prestigious academic works.

In 1928, Sukhareva worked as an associate professor at Moscow's first Medical Institute. From 1933 to 1935 she was leading the department of Psychiatry in Kharkiv University (Kharkiv Psychoneurological Institute). In 1935, Sukhareva founded a Faculty of Pediatric Psychiatry in the Central Institute of Postgraduate Medical Education, where she served as Head of the Department until 1965. In 1938, she led a clinic of childhood psychosis under the Russian SFSR Ministry of Agriculture and Food. Until 1969, she worked as a councillor and leader of the Psychiatric Hospital of Kashchenko in Moscow.

== Contribution to the study of autism ==
One of Sukhareva's primary areas of study throughout her career was autism in children. She is credited by scholars as making observations that closely mirror ASD as described by the DSM-5 and ICD-11.

Research conducted by Sukhareva during her time at the Sanatorium School gave her an advantage in making such groundbreaking, modern diagnostic assessments, likely due to the school's unique pedagogical approach. Students at the school were children with no other shelter or family, and thus were provided with a safe haven at the school in the aftermath of World War I. Students typically spent around 2–3 years at the school and were offered a range of training aimed at developing social and motor skills. While at this institution, Sukhareva worked very closely with the children under her care and made very distinct, meticulous observations regarding both their physical and behavioral characteristics. The detail of her findings played an integral role in her research being considered so significant by experts in the field of psychiatry today.

Sukhareva's first publication, wherein she became the first person in history to detail autistic traits in children, was released in Russian in 1925 and translated to German for publication in 1926. Sula Wolff translated it in 1996 for the English-speaking world. This seminal work consisted of clinical accounts of the syndrome in 6 young boys, wherein Sukhareva detailed behaviors that she identified as representative of "schizoid psychopathy". She expanded upon her discoveries in 1927 with the publication of her second work regarding manifestation of autism in young girls. Given the relatively little research that has been conducted in autistic women and girls, and the ICD-11 notes they remain under-diagnosed with ASD, Sukhareva is considered a pioneer in the field of psychiatry for her contributions in this regard as well. Sukhareva frequently cited her professor, and head of the psychoneurological department at Moscow, Mikhail Osipovich Gurevich, as her primary mentor in her publications. Scholars suggest the two worked closely together throughout her career.

While Sukhareva utilized the term "autistic" to describe these children and their proclivities, the term was only just surfacing in psychiatric literature at the time of her seminal publication. A decade prior to this publication, the term originated from Swiss psychiatric scholar Eugen Bleuler. Bleuler, frequently cited in Sukhareva's works, coined the term to encompass socially introverted or withdrawn behaviors that were typically linked to schizophrenia at the time. Along with other prominent Soviet psychiatrists of the era, Bleuler posited that ASD was a form of "mild schizophrenia". Sukhareva's work expanded upon the definition throughout her career while making great strides in differentiating between ASD and schizophrenia nearly 30 years prior to the establishment of separate classifications for these diagnoses with the publication of the DSM-III in 1980.

Sukhareva's observations on autistic tendencies were not the only aspect of her work that is considered to be well before its time by scholars. In fact, she is known to have hypothesized a neurological basis for the syndrome, suggesting that the anatomical brain regions known as the cerebellum, frontal lobe, and basal ganglia are all implicated in the development of ASD. These hypotheses have been confirmed by more recent neuroimaging studies.

She initially used the term "schizoid psychopathy" ("schizoid" meaning "eccentric" at the time), but later replaced it with "autistic (pathological avoidant) psychopathy" to describe the clinical picture of autism. The article was created almost two decades before the case reports of Hans Asperger and Leo Kanner, which were published while Sukhareva's pioneering work remained unnoticed. In as much as Sukhareva's autism research was translated and published in German-language journals within a year of its domestic publication in Russian, there existed no serious barrier to access of these materials by Asperger and Kanner. Kanner cited Sukhareva's 1932 publication Über den Verlauf der Schizophrenien im Kindesalter in papers published in 1949 and 1962. The precise reason for her extensive research remaining uncited in the work of Asperger, who also published in German, cannot be precisely determined, and is still a matter of discussion by experts. Her name was transliterated as "Ssucharewa" when her papers appeared in Germany.

== Psychiatry ==
Sukhareva believed that for personality disorders to appear in children and teenagers, a significant social factor was required. Some of the factors she discussed for personality disorders were a poor family environment and societal structure. She was a pioneer in using the method of suggestion, and fought for children's rights, stating that difficult children should not be sent to prisons, but to medical institutions. She also studied PTSD from war injuries sustained by children.

== Award ==
By order of the Moscow Department of Health, the Moscow Scientific and Practical Center for Mental Health of Children and Adolescents was named after Sukhareva, with the prefix G. E. Sukhareva appended to the front. The center is the leading specialized medical institution for the treatment of suicidal states in children and adolescents under 18 years of age.

== Sukhareva's patients ==
In 1926 then 1927, Sukhareva described six boys and five girls as having what is now considered autism. These anonymous patients, some of the first to be identified as having the disorder, were described as follows:

- A 12-year-old who had taught himself to read at age five. He was physically awkward and preferred talking to adults instead of children. He was very interested in philosophy.
- A gifted violinist who struggled socially.
- A child with exceptional memory of numbers but with face blindness.
- A child who had imaginary friends that lived in a fireplace.

== Selected works ==
- Sukhareva GE, Analysis of children's fantasies as a method of studying the emotional life of a child. Kyiv 1921.
- Sukhareva GE, Schizoid psychopathy in childhood. In the book: Questions of pedology and child psychoneurology, issue 2. M 1925; 157–187.
- Ssucharewa GE, Die schizoiden Psychopathien im Kindesalter. Monatsschrift für Psychiatrie und Neurologie 60: 235–261, 1926.
- Sukhareva GE, To the problem of the structure and dynamics of children's constitutional psychopathies (schizoid forms). Journal of Neuropathology and Psychiatry, 1930; 6
- Sukhareva GE, Features of the structure of the defect in various forms of the course of schizophrenia (on children's and adolescent material). Neuropathology, psychiatry, mental hygiene, 1935; IV: II: 57–62.
- Sukhareva GE, Schizophrenia clinic in children and adolescents. Part I. Kharkov: Gosmedizdat of the USSR 1937; 107.
- Sukhareva GE, Clinic of epilepsy in children and adolescents. Problems of theoretical and practical medicine. M 1938; 234–261.
- Sukhareva GE, Psychogenic types of wartime reactions. Neuropathology and psychiatry, 1943; 12: 2: 3-10
- Sukhareva GE, Clinical lectures on children's psychiatry. T. 1. M: Medgiz 1955; 459.
- Sukhareva GE, Clinical lectures on children's psychiatry. T. II, Part 2. M: Medicine, 1959; 406.
- Sukhareva GE, Lapides M. I. About the work of the psycho-neurological cabinet for children and teenagers at the psycho-neurological dispensary and children's clinic. M 1959.
- Sukhareva GE, Yusevich L. S. Psychogenic pathological reactions (neuroses). In the book: A multivolume guide to pediatrics, t. 8. M 1965.
- Sukhareva GE, Clinical lectures on children's psychiatry. T. 3. M: Medicine 1965; 270
- Sukhareva GE, The role of the age factor in the clinic of children's psychoses. Journal of Neuropathology and Psychiatry 1970; 70: 10: 1514–1520.
- Sukhareva GE, Lectures on children's psychiatry (Selected Chapters). M: Medicine 1974; 320.
- Sukhareva GE, translated by Rebecchi K, Autistic Children, Amazon: 2022 ISBN 978 169098676 8
