= ANKK1 =

Protein-coding gene in the species Homo sapiens

Identifiers
- Aliases: ANKK1, PKK2, ankyrin repeat and kinase domain containing 1, DRD2, sgK288
- External IDs: OMIM: 608774; MGI: 3045301; GeneCards: ANKK1
Enzyme activity
EC #	BRENDA	ExPASy	KEGG	MetaCyc
2.7.11.1	↗	↗	↗	↗

Gene location (Human)
Chr.	Chromosome 11 (human)
Band	11q23.2	Start	113,387,779 bp
Band	11q23.2	End	113,400,416 bp

Gene location (Mouse)
Chr.	Chromosome 9 (mouse)
Band	9|9 A5.3	Start	49,326,494 bp
Band	9|9 A5.3	End	49,338,321 bp
RNA expression pattern
Bgee	Human / Mouse (ortholog); Top expressed in: right uterine tube; pituitary gland; olfactory zone of nasal mucosa; anterior pituitary; skin of leg; skin of abdomen; granulocyte; left uterine tube; canal of the cervix; minor salivary glands / Top expressed in: striatum of neuraxis; superior frontal gyrus; dentate gyrus of hippocampal formation granule cell; primary visual cortex; placenta; stomach; hypothalamus; lip; lung; More reference expression data
BioGPS	n/a
Orthologs
Databases	NCBI: entry; OMA: entry
Species	Human	Mouse
Entrez	255239	244859
Ensembl	ENSG00000170209	ENSMUSG00000032257
UniProt	Q8NFD2	Q8BZ25
RefSeq (mRNA)	NM_178510	NM_172922; NM_001376951
RefSeq (protein)	NP_848605	NP_766510; NP_001363880
Location (UCSC)	Chr 11: 113.39 – 113.4 Mb	Chr 9: 49.33 – 49.34 Mb
PubMed search
- Wikidata
View/Edit Human	View/Edit Mouse

Ankyrin repeat and kinase domain containing 1 (ANKK1) also known as protein kinase PKK2 or sugen kinase 288 (SgK288) is an enzyme that in humans is encoded by the ANKK1 gene. The ANKK1 is a member of an extensive family of the Ser/Thr protein kinase family, and protein kinase superfamily involved in signal transduction pathways.

== Clinical significance ==
This gene contains a single nucleotide polymorphism that causes an amino acid substitution within the 11th of 12 ankyrin repeats of ANKK1 (Glu713Lys of 765 residues). This polymorphism, which is commonly referred to Taq1A, was previously believed to be located in the promoter region of the DRD2 gene, since the polymorphism is proximal to the DRD2 gene and can influence DRD2 receptor expression. It is now known to be located in the coding region of the ANKK1 gene which controls the synthesis of dopamine in the brain. The A1 allele is associated with increased activity of striatal L-amino acid decarboxylase.

=== A1+ allele ===
- Hepatitis C infection
- Antisocial personality disorder
- Borderline personality traits
- Schizoid/avoidant behavior

Given that the A1+ allele is associated with antisocial personality disorder, one may infer that the allele is also associated with narcissistic personality disorder and histrionic personality disorder. However, these predictions have not yet been empirically verified.

=== A1+ genotype frequencies ===
European population estimates for A1+ genotype frequencies range from 20.8 to 43.4% (National Center of Biotechnology Information (NCBI), identification number rs1800497).

=== Addictive behaviors ===
The ANKK1 gene is closely linked to dopamine receptor D2 (DRD2) on chromosome band 11q23.1. The A1 allele of the Taq1A polymorphism (rs1800497T), is located ≈10kb downstream of the dopamine receptor DRD2 gene. Dopamine (DA) is a neurotransmitter in the brain, which controls feelings of wellbeing. This sensation results from the interaction of dopamine and other neurotransmitters such as serotonin, the opioids, and other brain chemicals. Dopamine increases the motivation for food cravings and appetite mediation.

The reward deficiency syndrome (RDS) involves the pleasures or reward mechanisms that rely on dopamine. The result of this deficiency is based on the genetic makeup; this helps explain how certain simple genetic anomalies can give rise to complex aberrant behaviours as the ones mentioned previously. The A1 allelic prevalence has been reported to be significantly higher in obese individuals than in lean subjects; moreover, individuals with increased body mass index (BMI) (BMI ≥ 30 kg/m^{2}) have fewer DRD2 dopamine receptors. Investigators have also suggested that hormonal mechanism may underline a gender difference in the ability to suppress hunger in relation to this SNP, which may contribute to the greater incidence of obesity in women compared to men. However, authors have pointed out that A1 carriers have difficulty in learning from negative feedback in a reinforcement-learning task and are less efficient at learning to avoid actions that have negative consequences.
