= Counterphobic attitude =

Seeking out the source of one's fear to overcome it

In psychology, a counterphobic attitude is a response to anxiety that, instead of fleeing the source of fear in the manner of a phobia, actively seeks it out, in the hope of overcoming the original anxiousness. Contrary to avoidant personality disorder, the counterphobic represents the less usual, but not totally uncommon, response of seeking out what is feared. Codependents may fall into a subcategory of this group, hiding their fears of attachment in over-dependency.

== Action ==
Dare-devil activities are often undertaken in a counterphobic spirit, as a denial of the fears attached to them, which may be only partially successful. Acting out in general may have a counterphobic source, reflecting a false self over-concerned with compulsive doing to preserve a sense of power and control.

Sex is a key area for counterphobic activity, sometimes powering hypersexuality in people who are actually afraid of the objects they believe they love. Adolescents, fearing sex play, may jump over to a kind of spurious full sexuality; adults may overvalue sex to cover an unconscious fear of the harm it may do. Such a counterphobic approach may indeed be socially celebrated in a postmodern vision of sex as gymnastic performance or hygiene, fuelled by what Ken Wilber described as "an exuberant and fearless shallowness".

Traffic accidents have been linked to a counterphobic, manic attitude in the driver.

== Language ==
Julia Kristeva considered that language could be used by the developing child as a counterphobic object, protecting against anxiety and loss.

Ego psychology points out that through the ambiguities of language, the concrete meanings of words may break down the counterphobic attitude and return the child to a state of fear.

== Freud ==
Didier Anzieu saw Freud's theorisation of psychoanalysis as a counterphobic defence against anxiety through intellectualisation: permanently ruminating on the instinctive, emotional world that was the actual object of fear.

Wilhelm Fliess has been seen as playing the role of counterphobic object for Freud during the period of the latter's self-analysis.

== Therapy ==
Otto Fenichel considered that undoing systematised counterphobic defences was only a first step in therapy, needing to be followed by analysis of the original anxiety itself. He also considered that psychological trauma could break down counterphobic defences, with results that "may be very painful for the patient; they are, from a therapeutic point of view, favorable".

David Rapaport emphasised the need for caution and extreme slowness in analyzing counterphobic defences.

== Cultural examples ==
The attraction of horror movies has been seen to lie in a counterphobic impulse.

Many actors often have a shy personality when off-camera, released counterphobically in conditions of performance.

The Batman comics and movies often take Bruce Wayne's fear of bats as a central part of his origin story.

Sick, the documentary on performance artist Bob Flanagan, discusses the counterphobic attitude of Flanagan, who sought to escape the chronic pain of his cystic fibrosis by engaging in extreme acts of masochism.

== See also ==
- Accident-proneness
- Counterdependency
- Exposure therapy
- Extraversion
- Overcompensation
- Paradoxical intention
- Reaction formation
- Russian roulette
- Schizoid personality disorder
- Sexual fetishism
