= Attachment in adults =

Application of the theory of attachment to adults

In psychology, the theory of attachment in adults examines the way in which emotional connections are approached during adulthood across a spectrum of relationship types, which is posited to originate from the bonding experience received from caregivers as an infant.

Attachment theory was initially studied in the 20th century to associate infant behaviors with the attachment they had to their caregivers. The working models of children found in John Bowlby's attachment theory demonstrate a pattern of interaction which is likely to influence adult relationships.

== Background ==
Mary Ainsworth and John Bowlby founded the modern-day attachment theory on studies of children to their caregivers. Children and caregivers remained the primary focus of attachment theory for many years but, in the 1980s, Sue Johnson began using attachment theory in adult therapy settings. Cindy Hazan and Phillip Shaver continued to conduct research through analyzing adult relationships. Hazan and Shaver noticed that interactions between adults were similar to interactions between children and caregivers. Adults feel comforted when their attachment figures are present, but feel more anxious, and/or lonely, when their attachment figures are absent. Romantic relationships, for example, serve as a secure base that help people face the surprises, opportunities, and challenges life presents. Similarities such as these led Hazan and Shaver to extend attachment theory to adult relationships.

Relationships between adults also differ in some ways from relationships between children and caregivers. These two kinds of relationships are not identical, but the core principles of attachment theory apply to both child-caregiver relationships, and adult relationships.

== Attachment styles ==
Adult attachment has connected the theory to attachment styles in order to further understand behaviors, such as trust and emotional stability. Adults are described as generally relating to four attachment styles:

- Secure
- Anxious-preoccupied
- Dismissive-avoidant
- Fearful-avoidant

These attachment styles in adults can be seen to earlier connect to children's behaviors. The descriptions of adult attachment styles offered below are based on the relationship questionnaire devised by Bartholomew and Horowitz and on a review of studies by Pietromonaco and Barrett. Style and quality of attachment relationships can directly correlate with life satisfaction in adults. Average relationship duration can also be linked to the style of the participant's relationship.

=== Secure ===
Secure attachment is one of the four primary attachment styles that most often correlates with a positive view of yourself and your relationship with others. People that have a secure attachment style are often associated with high self-esteem, and have an easier time forming healthy relationships with others. Those with a secure attachment style often manage conflict without feeling overwhelmed and are not bothered by the concepts of closeness and independence.

This begins at childhood, signaling a relationship between parents and caregivers that reflects feeling loved and cared for. Children who are secure in relationships are often confident when interacting with others. It is typically seen that infants and children with this form of attachment felt safe and secure with their caregivers, and were able to communicate through their emotions. These behaviors usually continue into adulthood and allow these adults to form long term relationships without the fear of being abandoned.

Many adults who have a secure attachment style have an easier time trusting in themselves and their relationships. They do not feel the need for constant reassurance, so feeling close or distant in others does not have a large impact. Someone who demonstrates the qualities of a secure attachment style is more open to discuss previous relationships and does not have a hard time opening up.

In connection to romantic relationships, many securely attached individuals see happiness and trust in their relationships, and have an easier time supporting their partners despite their faults. Many of these relationships last longer and secure lovers feel strongly that their romantic love will not fade.

Even though people with a secure attachment style still have relationship challenges, they have a much more positive take on these issues and often take responsibility for their faults. Conflict is not something they want to engage with, so they try to find a solution.

=== Anxious-preoccupied ===
Anxious Preoccupied Attachment (sometimes known as anxious or anxious-ambivalent) is a form of attachment where individuals view themselves negatively, and feel unsure about trusting others. This attachment style creates a sense of gaining validation through relationships as a form of self-acceptance. These individuals seek intimacy but fear that others do not want to be with them.

This style was created in childhood likely because the caregivers' availability to the infant was sporadic, being sometimes emotionally unavailable. Because of this, the infant sought reassurance that their caregiver would provide stability. This attachment during infancy is present because the caregiver is sometimes present and other times not, so the caregiver's behavior becomes inconsistent. This continues into adulthood as individuals will seek reassurance and crave intimacy, but worry about others meeting their needs, emotionally. These individuals often find it hard to feel loved by their partners, while they also have a hard time expressing their love for others.

Individuals with anxious attachment seek approval by others regarding the security of the relationship. Delayed communication leads to worry by these individuals and may cause them to feel rejected. Even in stable relationships, many anxious attachment individuals worry about the state of the relationship.

=== Dismissive-avoidant ===
Dismissive-avoidant attachment is one of the main attachment styles, and is often connected with a positive self-view, but a negative view of others. Individuals with this attachment style often avoid closeness and intimacy with others. Individuals with a dismissive-avoidant attachment style typically suppress their emotions, and prioritize their personal independence.

The characteristics of individuals who are dismissive-avoidant include emotional distance, independence over closeness, difficulty sharing their emotions, providing mixed signals, and pushing away issues. By doing these things, these individuals hope to avoid confrontation with others and they put themselves first, and pull away when any issues arise.

This forms as children when the infant's caregivers are dismissive to the baby, and the child does not feel comfort. Due to this, the child slowly learns to trust themselves over their caregiver. This continues into adulthood, as these individuals pull away from others in order to control these emotions.

Individuals with a dismissive-avoidant style continually prefer to have emotional distance. Many have a hard time opening up to romantic partners, and when things feel real, they pull away. This can cause stress for the other person because they may not understand why this distance is being created. In therapy, this pattern is understood as a learned strategy rather than a fixed trait, and research on earned secure attachment suggests it can shift toward greater comfort with closeness over time.

=== Fearful-avoidant ===
Fearful avoidant attachment (also known as Disorganized Attachment) is the least common of the main attachment styles. Individuals with this attachment style are associated with a negative self-view, as well as a negative view of others. They seek close relationships, but are scared of them, and so experience a personal battle within themselves.

This attachment style develops through trauma as infants and children, which causes these individuals to have a difficult time forming relationships. These children become withdrawn socially and do not easily trust others. This continues into adulthood because they are often pushing and pulling other people. These individuals sometimes seek closeness, but other times crave distance due to fear of abandonment.

Many people with this attachment style may stay in the dating stage of romantic relationships as it takes longer to trust others. These individuals may shut down if the relationship becomes too serious, out of self protection. Many get nervous when they are in a stable relationship due to prior trauma and experiences.

== Working models ==
Bowlby observed that children learn from their interactions with caregivers. Throughout many interactions, children form expectations about the accessibility and helpfulness of their caregivers. These expectations reflect children's thoughts about themselves and their caregivers:

Confidence that an attachment figure is, apart from being accessible, likely to be responsive can be seen to turn on at least two variables: (a) whether or not the attachment figure is judged to be the sort of person who generally responds to calls for support and protection; (b) whether or not the self is judged to be the sort of person towards whom anyone, and the attachment figure, in particular, is likely to respond in a helpful way. Logically, these variables are independent. In practice, they are apt to be confounded. As a result, the model of the attachment figure and the model of the self are likely to develop to be complementary and mutually confirming. (Bowlby, 1973, p. 238)

=== Organization of working models ===
Bartholomew and Horowitz have proposed that working models consist of two parts. One part deals with thoughts about the self and the other deals with thoughts about others. They further propose that a person's thoughts about themselves are either generally positive or generally negative. The same applies to a person's thoughts about others. To test these proposals, Bartholomew and Horowitz have looked at the relationship between attachment styles, self-esteem, and sociability. The diagram below shows the relationships they observed:

Security-based strategy of affect regulation
		Self-esteem (thoughts about self)	
		Positive	Negative
Sociability (thoughts about others)	Positive	Secure	Anxious-preoccupied
Sociability (thoughts about others)	Negative	Dismissive-avoidant	Fearful-avoidant

=== Stability of working models ===
Investigators study the stability of working models by looking at the stability of attachment styles. Attachment styles reflect the thoughts and expectations that constitute working models. Changes in attachment styles, therefore, indicate changes in working models.

Around 70–80% of people experience no significant changes in attachment styles over time. The fact that attachment styles do not change for a majority of people indicates working models are relatively stable. Yet, around 20–30% of people do experience changes in attachment styles. These changes can occur over periods of weeks or months. The number of people who experience changes in attachment styles, and the short periods over which the changes occur, suggest working models are not rigid personality traits.

Why attachment styles change is not well understood. Waters, Weinfield and Hamilton propose that negative life experiences often cause changes in attachment styles. Their proposal is supported by evidence that people who experience negative life events also tend to experience changes in attachment styles. Davila, Karney, and Bradbury have identified four sets of factors that might cause changes in attachment styles: (a) situational events and circumstances, (b) changes in relational schemas, (c) personality variables, and (d) combinations of personality variables and situational events. They conducted a study to see which set of factors best explained changes in attachment styles. The study found that all four sets of factors cause changes in attachment styles. Changes in attachment styles are complex and depend on multiple factors.

== Relationship outcomes ==
=== Satisfaction ===
Several studies have linked attachment styles to relationship satisfaction. Adults who have a secure attachment style usually express greater satisfaction with their relationships. Adults with insecure (anxious or avoidant) attachment styles tend to have lower satisfaction and commitment within their relationships.

Although the link between attachment styles and marital satisfaction has been firmly established, the mechanisms by which attachment styles influence marital satisfaction remain poorly understood. One mechanism may be communication. Secure attachment styles may lead to more constructive communication and more intimate self-disclosures, which in turn increase relationship satisfaction. Other mechanisms by which attachment styles may influence relationship satisfaction include emotional expressiveness, strategies for coping with conflict, and perceived support from partners. Further studies are needed to better understand how attachment styles influence relationship satisfaction.

=== Duration ===
Some studies suggest that adults with a secure attachment style have longer-lasting relationships. This may be partly due to commitment. Adults with a secure attachment style tend to express more commitment to their relationships. Adults with a secure attachment style also tend to be more satisfied with their relationships, which may encourage them to stay in their relationships longer. However, having a secure attachment style is by no means a guarantee of long-lasting relationships. Relationship participants with anxious and avoidant attachment styles have been linked to a decreased level of commitment.

Nor are secure attachment styles the only attachment styles associated with stable relationships. Adults with the anxious–preoccupied attachment style often find themselves in long-lasting, but unhappy, relationships. Anxious–preoccupied attachment styles often involve anxiety about being abandoned and doubts about one's worth in a relationship. These kinds of feelings and thoughts may lead people to stay in unhappy relationships.

== See also ==
- Committed relationship
- Dynamic-maturational model of attachment and adaptation
- Counterdependency
- Human bonding
- Interdependence theory – Theory of social exchange
- Investment model of commitment – Predictive psychology theory about why people remain in relationships
- Emotionally focused therapy
- Fear of commitment
- Jean Piaget
- Traumatic bonding
- Monogamy
- Pair bonding
- Attachment parenting
- Term of endearment

== Bibliography ==
- Andersson P (2006). Determinants of Individual Vulnerability to Heroin Addiction – A Psychosocial Study (Ph.D. thesis). Åbo Akademi University. ISBN 952-12-1677-8. Archived from the original on 2007-02-21.
- Cassidy J, Shaver P, eds. (1999). Handbook of Attachment: Theory, Research, and Clinical Applications. NY: Guilford Press.
- Greenberg MT, Cicchetti D, Cummings EM, eds. (1990). Attachment in the Preschool Years: Theory, Research and Intervention. Chicago: University of Chicago.
- Greenspan S (1993). Infancy and Early Childhood. Madison, CT: International Universities Press. ISBN 0-8236-2633-4.
- Holmes J (1993). John Bowlby and Attachment Theory. Routledge. ISBN 0-415-07730-3.
- Holmes J (2001). The Search for the Secure Base: Attachment Theory and Psychotherapy. London: Brunner-Routledge. ISBN 1-58391-152-9.
- Karen R (1998). Becoming Attached: First Relationships and How They Shape Our Capacity to Love. Oxford University Press. ISBN 0-19-511501-5.
- Levine A, Heller R (2010). Attached: The New Science of Adult Attachment and How It Can Help You Find—And Keep—Love. Jeremy P. Tarcher/Penguin. ISBN 978-1-58542-848-9.
- Parkes, CM, Stevenson-Hinde J, Marris P, eds. (1991). Attachment Across The Life Cycle. NY: Routledge. ISBN 0-415-05651-9.
- Pistole MC (1996). "After Love: Attachment Styles and Grief Themes". The Family Journal. 4 (3): 199–207. doi:10.1177/1066480796043003. S2CID 145254368.
- Pistole MC (1995). "College Students' Ended Love Relationships: Attachment Style and Emotion". Journal of College Student Development. 36 (1): 53–60.
- Ridge SR, Feeney JA (December 1998). "Relationship history and relationship attitudes in gay males and lesbians: attachment style and gender differences". The Australian and New Zealand Journal of Psychiatry. 32 (6): 848–859. doi:10.3109/00048679809073875. PMID 10084350. S2CID 37450806.
- Robinson LA (1999). "The relationships between attachment style and romantic attachment, autonomy and equality in lesbian relationships". Australian Journal of Psychology. 51: 137.
- Siegler R, DeLoache J, Eisenberg N (2003). How Children develop. New York: Worth. ISBN 1-57259-249-4.
- Heard DH, Lake B (October 1986). "The Attachment Dynamic in adult life". The British Journal of Psychiatry. 149 (4): 430–438. doi:10.1192/bjp.149.4.430. PMID 3814926. S2CID 6655724.
- Fox J, Tokunaga RS (September 2015). "Romantic Partner Monitoring After Breakups: Attachment, Dependence, Distress, and Post-Dissolution Online Surveillance via Social Networking Sites". Cyberpsychology, Behavior and Social Networking. 18 (9): 491–498. doi:10.1089/cyber.2015.0123. PMID 26348808.
