= James F. Masterson =

American psychiatrist (1926-2010)

- Born: March 25, 1926; Elkins Park, Pennsylvania, U.S.
- Died: April 12, 2010 (aged 84); Greenwich, Connecticut, U.S.
- Education: University of Notre Dame; Thomas Jefferson University
- Scientific career
- Fields: Psychiatry

James F. Masterson (March 25, 1926—April 12, 2010) was a prominent American psychiatrist.

He was a psychiatrist who helped inaugurate the study and treatment of personality disorder including borderline personality disorder, narcissistic personality disorder and schizoid personality disorder. He died April 12, 2010, of pneumonia at the age of eighty-four.

== On narcissism ==
In 1993, Masterson proposed two categories for pathological narcissism, "exhibitionist" and "closet".

== Works ==
- Psychotherapy of the Borderline Adult: A Developmental Approach. (Brunner/Mazel, 1976) ISBN 0-87630-127-8
- The Real Self: A Developmental, Self, and Object Relations Approach. (Brunner/Mazel, 1985) ISBN 0-87630-400-5
- The Search for the Real Self: Unmasking the Personality Disorders of Our Age. (Collier Macmillan, 1988) ISBN 0-02-920291-4
- The Emerging Self: A Developmental Self & Object Relations Approach to the Treatment of the Closet Narcissistic Disorder of the Self (Routledge, 1993)
- The Personality Disorders Through The Lens of Attachment Theory and the Neurobiologic Development of the Self (Zeig, Tucker & Theisen, 2005)
- The Search for the Real Self: Unmasking the Personality Disorders of Our Age (Free Press, Simon & Schuster, 1988)
- The Narcissistic and Borderline Disorders (Brunner/Mazel, 1981)
- The Psychiatric Dilemma of Adolescence (Little, Brown, 1967)
- Disorders of the Self: New Therapeutic Horizons: The Masterson Approach, Masterson & Klein, eds. (Brunner/Mazel, 1995).
