= Counterdependency =

Refusal of attachment

Counterdependency is the state of refusal of attachment, the denial of personal need and dependency, and may extend to the omnipotence and refusal of dialogue found in destructive narcissism, for example.

== Developmental origins ==
The roots of counterdependency can be found in the age-appropriate negativism of two-year-olds and teens, where it serves the temporary purpose of distancing one from the parental figure[s]. As Selma Fraiberg put it, the two-year-old "says 'no' with splendid authority to almost any question addressed to him...as if he establishes his independence, his separateness from his mother, by being opposite". Where the mother has difficulty accepting the child's need for active distancing, the child may remain stuck in the counterdependent phase of development because of developmental trauma.

In similar fashion, the teenager needs to be able to establish the fact of their separate mind to their parents, even if only through a sustained state of cold rejection; and again unresolved adolescent issues can lead to a mechanical counterdependency and unruly assertiveness in later life.

== Adult manifestations ==
The counterdependent personality has been described as being addicted to activity and suffering from grandiosity, as acting strong and pushing others away. Out of a fear of being crowded, they avoid contact with others, something which can lead through emotional isolation to depression.

The counterdependent male in particular may pride himself on being 'manly' – not needing affection, support or warmth, and being tough, independent and normal instead – something still reinforced by gender socialisation. Where a woman takes on the counterdependent position, it may take on the attributes of a false self or androcentric persona.

The apparently independent behavior of the counterdependent can act as a powerful lure for the co-dependent – though once a couple has formed the two partners – codependent / counterdependent – are sometimes found to switch roles.

In therapy, the counterdependent personality often wishes to flee treatment, as a defense against the possibility of regression. By keeping the therapist at arm's length, and avoiding reference to feelings as far as possible, they may attempt to control the therapist so as to preserve their sense of independence.

== Existential views ==
Existential therapists distinguish between interdependency on the one hand, and, on the other, both dependency and an escapist form of rebellious counterdependence.

== Transference ==
Counterdependency can present itself in a clinical situation in the form of a negative transference.

In George Kelly's personal construct theory, the term is used in another sense, to describe the therapist's transference of dependency onto the client: counterdependent transference.

== See also ==
- Attachment in adults
- Autonomy
- Counterphobic attitude
- Couples therapy
- Karpman drama triangle
- Ludwig Binswanger
- Mind your own business
- Oppositional defiant disorder
- Schizoid avoidant behavior
