= Sula Wolff =

British child psychiatrist (1924–2009)

Sula Wolff FRCP FRCPsych
- Born: Sulammith Wolff; 1 March 1924; Berlin, Germany
- Died: 21 September 2009 (aged 85); Edinburgh, Scotland, United Kingdom
- Education: University of Oxford
- Occupations: physician, author
- Relatives: Henry Walton (husband)
- Medical career
- Profession: child psychiatrist, medical author
- Sub-specialties: autism

Sulammith (Sula) Wolff FRCP FRCPsych (1 March 1924 – 21 September 2009) was a prominent and pioneering British child psychiatrist. She was amongst the first in her field to identify and define the characteristics of children on the autistic spectrum and establish the genetic component of the condition. Her work focused principally on a group of socially withdrawn, eccentric and schizoid children which she followed for over 20 years.

In 1996, she translated a 1925 landmark paper that had been written in Russian by Grunya Sukhareva, and which may be the earliest description of autistic symptoms in children.

== Early life ==
She was born on 1 March 1924 in Berlin, Weimar Germany, to Friedel (née Saloman) and Walther Wolff, a patent lawyer. She was brought up in Wetzlar. When Adolf Hitler became Chancellor of Germany in 1933 she moved with her family to Hampstead, England. She attended South Hampstead High School, going on to study medicine at the University of Oxford, graduating in 1947.

== Career ==
In her early career she worked at John Radcliffe Hospital, Oxford, Royal Liverpool hospital and Whittington Hospital, London.

She undertook post-graduate training in psychiatry at Maudsley Hospital under psychiatrist Sir Aubrey Lewis, developing an interest in the psychological problems of children. After Maudsley Hospital she practised in Cape Town where she was the country's first child psychiatrist. She then moved to New York to work as a research fellow before settling in Edinburgh in 1962. In 1966 she became a consultant psychiatrist at the Royal Hospital for Sick Children.

== Awards ==
She was an honorary fellow of the Department of Psychiatry at the University of Edinburgh, a Fellow of the Royal College of Physicians (1972), the Royal College of Psychiatrists (1972) and the Royal Society of Medicine.

== Personal life ==
While working at Maudsley Hospital she met Henry Walton, a South African psychiatrist. When he returned to South Africa to become Head of Psychiatry at Groote Schuur Hospital she went with him. They married in Cape Town in 1959. She moved with Walton to the United States in 1960 and Edinburgh, Scotland, in 1962.

Wolff died in Edinburgh on 21 September 2009, a short time after being diagnosed with leukemia.

== Publications ==
- Children Under Stress Penguin Press: London (1969). ISBN 9780140136449.
- Loners: the Life Path of Unusual Children Routledge: London (1995). ISBN 978-0-415-06665-5.

Children Under Stress was popular not only with child psychiatrists but also social workers, teachers and psychologists.
