= Emotion (journal) =

- Discipline: Psychology
- Language: English
- Edited by: Paula R. Pietromonaco

Publication details
- History: 2001–present
- Publisher: American Psychological Association (United States)
- Frequency: Bimonthly
- Impact factor: 3.6 (2024)

Standard abbreviations
- ISO 4: Emotion

Indexing
- CODEN: EMOTCL
- ISSN: 1528-3542 (print); 1931-1516 (web)
- LCCN: 00211497
- OCLC no.: 48668559

Links
- Journal homepage; Online access

Emotion is a peer-reviewed scientific journal, which, as its title states, publishes articles relating to the study of emotion. It is one of several psychology journals published by the American Psychological Association. It was established by founding co-editors-in-chief Richard Davidson and Klaus Scherer in 2001. The current editor-in-chief is Naomi I. Eisenberger. Initially published quarterly, the publication frequency has been bimonthly since 2008.

The journal has implemented the Transparency and Openness Promotion guidelines that provide structure to research planning and reporting and aim to make research more transparent, accessible, and reproducible.

== Abstracting and indexing ==
For indexing purposes, Emotion is also referred to as Emotion (Washington D.C.). The journal is abstracted and indexed in Biological Abstracts, BIOSIS Previews, CINAHL Plus with Full Text, Current Contents, EMBASE, Index Medicus, I B Z - Internationale Bibliographie der Geistes- und Sozialwissenschaftlichen Zeitschriftenliteratur, Internationale Bibliographie der Rezensionen Geistes- und Sozialwissenschaftlicher Literatur, MEDLINE, PsycINFO, PubMed, Scopus, and Social Sciences Citation Index.

According to the Journal Citation Reports, the journal has a 2024 impact factor of 3.6.
