= Avoidant personality disorder =

Personality disorder

- Other names: Anxious personality disorder
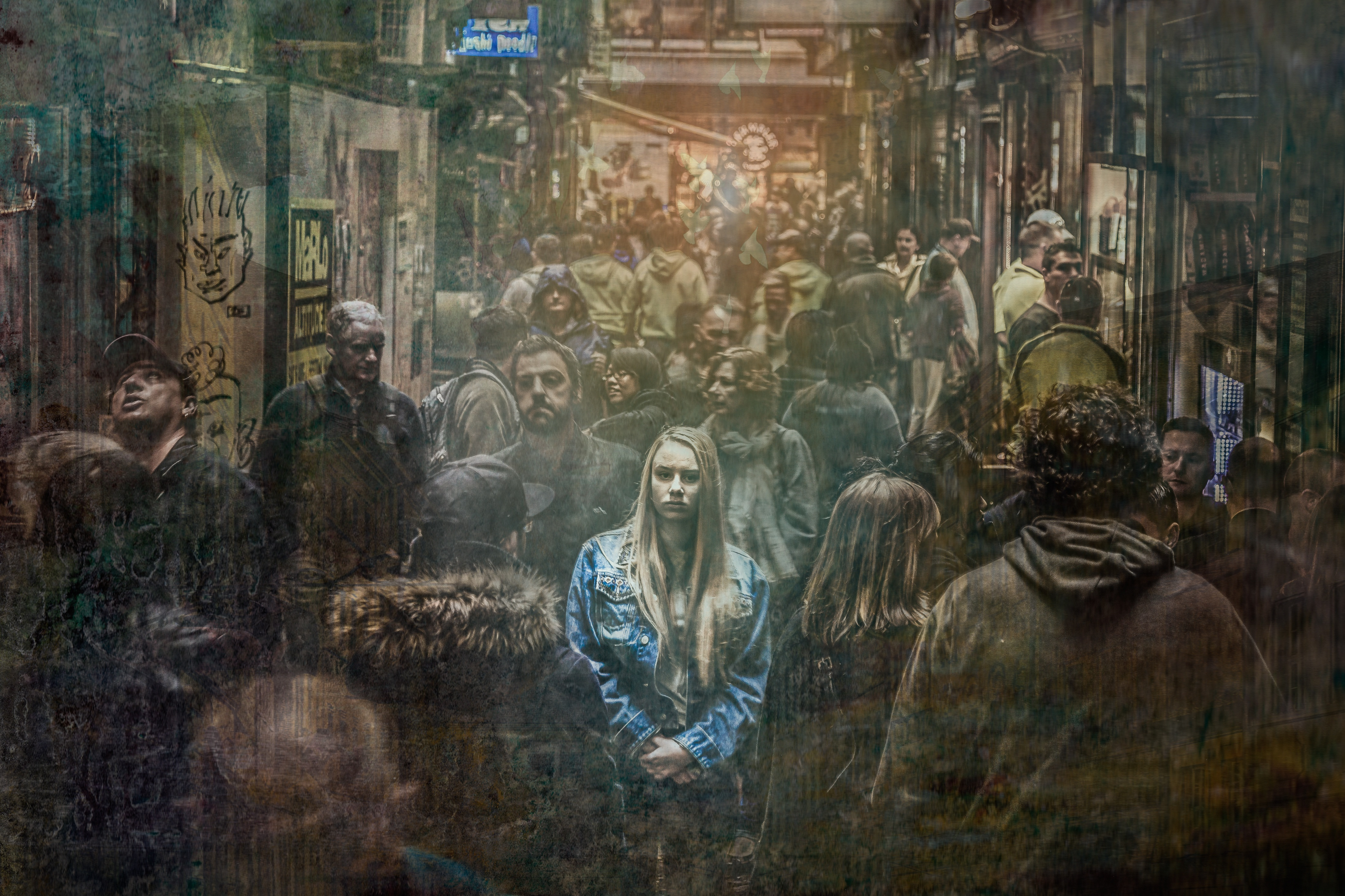
- Social inhibition is common in AvPD.
- Specialty: Psychiatry, clinical psychology
- Symptoms: Social anxiety, social inhibition, feelings of inadequacy and inferiority, withdrawal
- Duration: Chronic
- Causes: Not well understood; genetic, temperamental, and environmental factors have been implicated
- Differential diagnosis: Social anxiety disorder; dependent, paranoid, schizoid and schizotypal personality disorders.
- Treatment: Psychotherapy
- Prognosis: The disorder causes socio-occupational impairment. Improvement may be possible with treatment or time.
- Prevalence: 1.5–2.5%

Avoidant personality disorder (AvPD), or anxious personality disorder, is a personality disorder characterized by marked social inhibition and avoidance, accompanied by feelings of inadequacy and a strong sensitivity to rejection or negative evaluation. People with AvPD may therefore avoid social interaction, while at the same time strongly desiring more involvement with other people.

Not precisely known, the causes of AvPD are believed to involve several environmental and genetic factors. The disorder is chronic, and research is limited with regard to its treatment. Treatment and time may allow for the condition to improve. Seemingly, it affects a similar number of women as it does men, with some indication of a higher prevalence among women.

There are two definitions of AvPD in the Diagnostic and Statistical Manual of Mental Disorders since the publication of its fifth edition (DSM-5); the primary definition is categorical, while the other is derived from a dimensional model. The most recent revision (ICD-11) of the International Classification of Diseases does not specifically include AvPD or other specific personality disorders, having replaced such diagnoses with a dimensional classification system.

== Signs and symptoms ==
Characteristically, people with AvPD have a tendency to view themselves as inferior to other people, believing that they are unappealing and have inadequate social skills, and they worry extensively about being rejected or subjected to criticism and ridicule. This may consequently lead them to be wary about social interaction and self-disclosure, in the absence of reassurance from others that they are accepted. This, in turn, is contrasted with them usually desiring interpersonal relationships, without which they experience a deep sense of loneliness.

People with AvPD believe themselves to be inferior to others in various aspects, expecting to be criticized for those shortcomings, accompanied by the belief that others will persistently think negatively of them. In order to avoid subjection to criticism, a person with AvPD may abstain from entering friendships, taking part in group activities or accepting a job offer or promotion. They may therefore also specifically strive to obtain a job requiring little interaction with others. In the presence of others, they are disinclined to perform activities or share personal thoughts and feelings that may result in embarrassment; instead, they may, for example, wait for an opportunity to agree with what someone else says.

Some with this disorder fantasize about idealized relationships. They often think of themselves as unworthy of the relationships they desire, and shame themselves from ever attempting to begin them. Someone with AvPD may rigorously test whether others will reliably approve of them. If they can ascertain that they will be accepted without criticism, an intimate relationship is a feasible prospect. At the same time, they may have difficulty being vulnerable through self-disclosure and sharing their feelings. It is common that they pre-emptively abandon relationships, fearing that they will fail.

They are likely to vigilantly monitor others' expression, and may erroneously perceive criticism in others' comments about them. Even minor expressions of disapproval may feel upsetting to someone with AvPD. Expressing a reticent and fearful demeanor, their behavior may include a discernible aversion to eye contact and limited speech; when they speak, they are likely to be self-effacing, downplaying their accomplishments. Moreover, their lack of confidence in themselves may be exacerbated by others mocking their apparent fearfulness.

== Causes ==
With research on the matter being limited, the etiology of AvPD has not yet been thoroughly explained. Findings suggest that several factors may contribute to the development of the disorder; these include early childhood experiences, genetics, temperament, and environment. The significance of these factors relative to each other remains uncertain.

A genetic contribution to AvPD is suggested by an estimated heritability coefficient of 0.64 that was found in a population-based twin study. Regarding temperamental traits, behavioral inhibition, shyness, negative emotionality, and high harm avoidance have been linked to AvPD. These traits may increase vulnerability to adverse childhood experiences. They may also influence the development and use of avoidant coping strategies. Moreover, people with AvPD have reported experiences of neglect, abuse, lower care, and overprotection in childhood; however, recall bias may influence such reports. Because twin studies have suggested an environmental component in the etiology of AvPD, such childhood experiences have been proposed as possible environmental contributors.

== Diagnosis ==
=== Classification ===
Classification of personality disorders differs significantly between the frameworks incorporated into the Diagnostic and Statistical Manual of Mental Disorders (DSM) and International Classification of Diseases (ICD). The DSM-5 includes two distinct diagnostic models for personality disorders; its main body (Section II) retains a traditional, categorical model of 10 putatively distinct PDs, whereas the hybrid categorical–dimensional Alternative DSM-5 Model for Personality Disorders (AMPD) is based on impairment in personality functioning as well as pathological personality traits, based on which PD diagnoses are constructed. In the ICD-11, a dimensional model of personality disorders is implemented. Similarly to the AMPD, it is based on severity and pathological traits; however, it does not classify PD as types, and characterization of the disorder through trait qualifiers is optional. The introduction of the AMPD and the ICD-11 classification of personality disorders reflects a broader transition towards dimensional PD models.

==== DSM-5 ====
In the categorical DSM-5 classification of personality disorders, AvPD is described as "a pervasive pattern of social inhibition, feelings of inadequacy, and hypersensitivity to negative evaluation", for a diagnosis of which at least four out of seven diagnostic criteria must be met. The polythetic nature of this approach results in heterogeneity within the diagnosis, which can manifest as two people receiving the same diagnosis while only one criterion is met by both of them; however, research has suggested that the AvPD construct, as described in the DSM-IV-TR, (Note: The criteria have not changed from the DSM-IV through to DSM-5 Section II.) is unidimensional. This classification system groups personality disorders into three clusters, with AvPD belonging to cluster C, which is a cluster characterized by anxious and fearful presentations.

==== AMPD ====
Contained within Section III of the DSM-5 as an alternative to the categorical model, the AMPD defines six specific personality disorders – one of them being AvPD – based on particular constellations of the characteristic manner in which the disorder impacts personality functioning, as manifested in impairments in the identity, self-direction, empathy and intimacy domains (criterion A), as well as a set of pathological personality traits characterizing the disorder (criterion B). While criterion A thus captures the severity of the disorder, criterion B characterizes its "style".

At least two of the elements of personality functioning must have a "moderate or greater impairment", manifesting in, for example, the following being true for the identity domain: "[l]ow self-esteem associated with self-appraisal as socially inept, personally unappealing, or inferior; excessive feelings of shame". The AMPD lists the following four pathological traits: anxiousness, withdrawal, anhedonia, and intimacy avoidance; each of these is followed by a description of how the trait manifests in AvPD, such as "reticence in social situations; avoidance of social contacts and activity; [and] lack of initiation of social contact" in the case of withdrawal. A diagnosis requires that three of these traits are present in the subject, with anxiousness being required. Furthermore, additional traits can be added as specifiers to the diagnosis. Further requirements, for example relating to differential diagnosis, are embodied in criteria C–G.

==== ICD-11 ====
With the introduction of the ICD-11, categories of personality disorder were abolished in favor of a system in which personality disorder is instead classified by severity, with specification of traits or a borderline pattern being optional. Severity is assessed based on the degree and pervasiveness of disturbance in the person’s relationships and their sense of self; the intensity and breadth of the emotional, cognitive and behavioral manifestations of the person’s disturbance; the extent to which these patterns and problems cause distress or psychosocial impairment; and the level of risk of harm to self and others. Trait and pattern specifiers are used for recording the manner in which the disturbance is manifested.

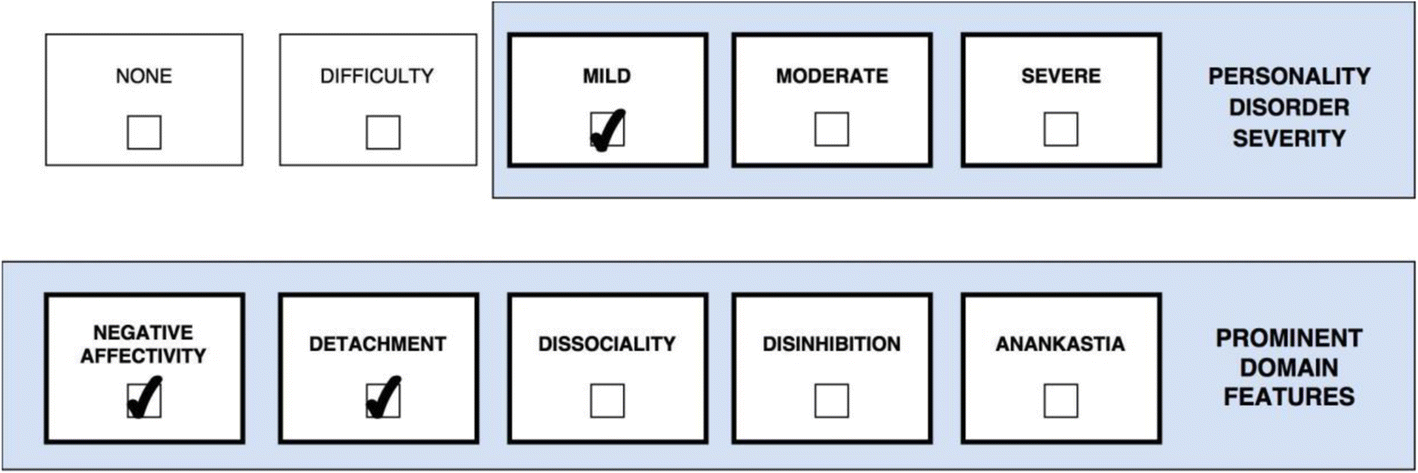
This ICD-11 case profile could belong to a person eligible for ICD-10 avoidant and dependent PD diagnoses.

Anxious (avoidant) personality disorder has been found to be consistently associated with the ICD-11 trait domains Negative Affectivity and Detachment, reflecting anxiousness, low self-esteem, and social withdrawal. The complete Avoidant PD pattern of Negative Affectivity and Detachment is overall consistent with the description of people with AvPD as being both fearful and emotionally inhibited. Many studies also report a link to Anankastia, likely due to features such as emotional restraint and excessive caution aimed at avoiding negative outcomes.

=== Differential diagnosis ===
In the case of AvPD, differential diagnosis primarily concerns social anxiety disorder (SAD), which has significant similarities to AvPD, with the distinction between the two being a matter of inquiry. Another personality disorder diagnosis could also be more suitable for a presentation considered for a diagnosis of AvPD; however, these can otherwise be diagnosed alongside AvPD, provided that the requirements for diagnosis are met for all of them (see § Comorbidity). Specifically, dependent, paranoid, schizoid and schizotypal personality disorders share features with AvPD while being possible to distinguish from it based on characteristic differences.

The relationship between AvPD and SAD has been a topic of debate, with research having been conducted in order to clarify the matter. They have similar features and diagnostic criteria, and research shows similarities in etiology, response to treatment, and deficits in quality of life. This has led to the conceptualization of the two as being the same disorder at different levels of severity, with AvPD being more severe than SAD. This "severity continuum hypothesis" is further supported by research showing that, when controlled for the severity of social anxiety, differences in impairment between the two disappear. Other research, specifically conducted using criteria from the DSM-IV, has however not consistently shown AvPD to be more severe, challenging the aforementioned hypothesis; changes in diagnostic criteria across editions of the DSM have been significant for research on the distinction between the two disorders. The separation may also find support in that about two thirds of those diagnosed with AvPD do not meet criteria for SAD. The "social fears seem to be more 'ingrained' in the self-concept" in the case of AvPD, and features such as "restraint in intimate relationships", lower self-respect, and "higher emotional guardedness" may be considered specific to AvPD. As opposed to this, SAD more typically relates to anxiety in situations, rather than to relationships in general.

A feature shared by AvPD with schizoid (SzPD) and schizotypal (StPD) personality disorders, social isolation is characterized by it stemming from active avoidance of rejection in the case of AvPD. Whereas people with AvPD desire to have relationships with other people and experience loneliness stemming from their isolation, those with SzPD and StPD may not experience discomfort stemming from it. In regards to SzPD, the behavior giving rise to isolation is of a passive character, rooted in disinterest. In regards to paranoid PD, the "reluctance to confide in others", which it shares with AvPD, stems from a "a fear of others' malicious intent", rather than from a "fear of being embarrassed or being found inadequate", as in the case of AvPD.

AvPD shares "feelings of inadequacy, hypersensitivity to criticism, and [...] need for reassurance" with dependent personality disorder (DPD); in addition, studies point to other shared features, these being: low self-confidence, self-deprecation, unassertive behavior and a fear of abandonment. The disorders differ in that while people with AvPD worry excessively about being rejected and humiliated, those with DPD experience a need of nurturance, which have been described as reasons why people with both disorders, respectively, lack assertiveness. Moreover, reportedly, while people with AvPD engage in social withdrawal, those with DPD endeavor to be close to important others; other research indicates that a stable association with alexithymia also serves to differentiate AvPD from DPD.

== Treatment ==
Treatment of avoidant personality disorder has been researched only to a limited extent, with much of the research being derived from studies of social anxiety disorder. Psychotherapeutic approaches are predominant, with cognitive behavioral therapy, schema therapy, psychodynamic psychotherapy and exposure therapy being among modalities that have shown indications of potentially being beneficial. The use of pharmacotherapy for treatment of AvPD has not found support in research, but it may be used for comorbid conditions such as social anxiety disorder and depression, for which there is evidence of its efficacy.

In general, treatment occurs with the aim of equipping the person with AvPD with the willingness to relate to other people even when faced with uncertainty, as well as the ability to handle the responses they elicit from others. Change requires that the person begins to take risks in interpersonal relationships, such as assertiveness in communication. Accordingly, acquisition merely of the ability to relate to the therapist is not conducive to progress, as this is analogous to the few relationships to people close to themselves that people with AvPD are already able to maintain. A key issue in treatment is gaining and keeping the patient's trust since people with an avoidant personality disorder will often start to avoid treatment sessions if they distrust the therapist or fear rejection.

== Prognosis ==
Avoidant personality disorder is chronic. Its symptoms often appear early in childhood, and they may subsequently increase in severity in adolescence and early adulthood. Research findings suggest that the symptoms of AvPD tend to persist over time; however, there is some research suggesting that the condition may be improved or go into remission over time and with the help of treatment. This disorder causes impairment in socio-occupational functioning, with those affected having an increased likelihood of lower education and obtaining disability benefits; cohabitation and marriage are also less likely with AvPD.

== Epidemiology ==
Reported to be at around 1.5%–2.5%, the prevalence of AvPD has also been estimated to be both lower and significantly higher than that. Its prevalence in clinical settings has been estimated between 5.1 and 55.4%, with one study finding this to be 14.7% in psychiatric outpatients. It has been reported that the disorder "appears to be equally frequent in males and females", with some studies indicating a higher prevalence among women. An increased prevalence of AvPD has also been found in relatives of people with schizophrenia, suggesting a relationship to the schizophrenia spectrum.

Anxiety disorders are commonly comorbid to AvPD, with social anxiety disorder (SAD) being especially common, and the prevalence of panic disorder and social phobia (the latter of which preceded SAD as a diagnostic category) having been found to be "up to eight or nine times more likely for those diagnosed with AvPD". To a lesser extent, depressive disorders are also common, as are substance abuse, as well as bipolar disorder. Of personality disorders, borderline, dependent, paranoid, schizoid and schizotypal are frequently diagnosed together with AvPD.

== History ==
Conditions closely resembling avoidant personality disorder have been described by several theorists before the introduction of AvPD as a diagnostic category. In 1910, August Hoch described people exhibiting a pattern of shyness, social withdrawal, and immersion into fantasy. The following year, in his 1911 work Dementia Praecox: Or the Group of Schizophrenias, Eugen Bleuler described clients who "quite consciously shun contact with reality because their affects are so powerful that they must avoid everything which might arouse emotions", labeling them "schizoid". Another description of a similar condition, called the "aesthetic personality", was given by Kurt Schneider in 1923. Ernst Kretschmer suggested that the schizoid concept should be subdivided into an "anaesthetic" and a "hyperaesthetic" subtype, bearing resemblance to the schizoid (SzPD) and avoidant personality disorders, respectively, as described in the DSM-III and DSM-III-R. Later, other descriptions resembling AvPD were formulated by Karen Horney, as well as several other psychoanalytic theorists.

Theodore Millon made a conceptual separation of the avoidant and schizoid personality disorders, while breaking from psychoanalytic theory in favor of social learning theory and personality psychology. The separation of AvPD from SzPD drew controversy due to an understanding in the psychiatric field that the separation reflected a misunderstanding of Kretschmer's conceptualization, which was rooted in psychoanalyis; as understood by critics, the subtypes described by Kretschmer represented opposite ends of a continuum and therefore did not warrant classification as separate disorders. However, subsequent research came to support the distinction.

In 1980, avoidant personality disorder was introduced into the Diagnostic and Statistical Manual of Mental Disorders for the first time, with the publication of the DSM-III. Its definition was changed significantly for the DSM-III-R, corresponding more closely to the "phobic character" rooted in psychoanalysis; thus, "fears of being inappropriate or embarrassed, as well as tendencies to exaggerate dangers and risks" were incorporated into the AvPD concept, while "low self-esteem and hypersensitivity to rejection" lost prominence. Also, the social withdrawal embodied in the criteria was divided into two domains, the social and the occupational. The transition to the DSM-IV brought changes made with the aim of clarifying the difference between AvPD on the one hand, and SzPD and social phobia on the other. Furthermore, intimate relationships were also specified to be affected by the withdrawal. Throughout these revisions, the order of the criteria was changed in an attempt to list what was believed to be the most essential features first. Previous criteria sets included blushing and crying, as well as a desire for affection; these subsequently remained in the text describing the disorder.

The DSM-IV definition of AvPD was carried over verbatim to the DSM-5, as was the case with the categorical PD classification as a whole. Having been found to have several deficiencies, such as categories capturing a heterogeneous set of presentations and the thresholds for the diagnoses being arbitrary, this system was deemed to merit replacement. With the intent to mitigate such issues and to create a system of classification with better empirical support, what became the AMPD was subsequently created. However, with the publication of the DSM-5, the AMPD was placed into Section III ("emerging measures and models"), whereas the categorical system was retained for the main section (Section II), because it would have constituted a significant and sudden change. Whereas in the ICD-10 classification of personality disorders, anxious (avoidant) personality disorder had been included as a distinct, categorical diagnosis, the categorical diagnoses were abolished with the introduction of the ICD-11 system.

Research on AvPD has primarily focused on distinguishing it from social anxiety disorder, while research is lacking in regards to treatment. In their review article on AvPD, Weinbrecht et al. 2016 call it a "neglected disorder", "in light of prevalence rates, societal costs, and the current state of research".

== See also ==
- Attachment theory
- Avoidance coping
- Counterphobic attitude
- Experiential avoidance
- Inferiority complex
- Sensory processing sensitivity
- Hermit
- Hikikomori
- Loner
- Recluse
- Solitude
- Taijin kyofusho
