= Omnipotence =

Property of possessing maximal power

Omnipotence is the property of possessing unlimited power and the ability to conduct anything. Monotheistic religions generally attribute omnipotence only to the deity of their faith. In the monotheistic religious philosophy of Abrahamic religions, omnipotence is often listed as one of God's characteristics, along with omniscience, omnipresence, and omnibenevolence.

== Etymology ==
The word omnipotence derives from the Latin prefix omni-, meaning "all", and the word potens, meaning "potent" or "powerful". Thus the term means "all-powerful".

== Meanings ==
=== Scholasticism ===
The term omnipotent has been used to connote a number of different positions. These positions include, but are not limited to, the following:

1. A deity is able to do anything that it chooses to do. (In this version, God can do the impossible and something contradictory.)
2. A deity is able to do anything that is in accord with its own nature (thus, for instance, if it is a logical consequence of a deity's nature that what it speaks is truth, then it is not able to lie).
3. It is part of a deity's nature to be consistent and that it would be inconsistent for said deity to go against its own laws unless there was a reason to do so.

Thomas Aquinas acknowledged difficulty in comprehending the deity's power: "All confess that God is omnipotent; but it seems difficult to explain in what His omnipotence precisely consists: for there may be doubt as to the precise meaning of the word 'all' when we say that God can do all things. If, however, we consider the matter aright, since power is said in reference to possible things, this phrase, 'God can do all things,' is rightly understood to mean that God can do all things that are possible; and for this reason He is said to be omnipotent." In Scholasticism, omnipotence is generally understood to be compatible with certain limitations or restrictions. A proposition that is necessarily true is one whose negation is self-contradictory.

It is sometimes objected that this aspect of omnipotence involves the contradiction that God cannot do all that He can do; but the argument is sophistical; it is no contradiction to assert that God can realize whatever is possible, but that no number of actualized possibilities exhausts His power. [...] Omnipotence is perfect power, free from all mere potentiality. Hence, although God does not bring into external being all that He is able to accomplish, His power must not be understood as passing through successive stages before its effect is accomplished. The activity of God is simple and eternal, without evolution or change. The transition from possibility to actuality or from act to potentiality, occurs only in creatures. When it is said that God can or could do a thing, the terms are not to be understood in the sense in which they are applied to created causes, but as conveying the idea of a Being, the range of Whose activity is limited only by His sovereign Will.

— John Ambrose McHugh, "Omnipotence", Catholic Encyclopedia (1913)

Aquinas says that:

Power is predicated of God not as something really distinct from His knowledge and will, but as differing from them logically; inasmuch as power implies a notion of a principle putting into execution what the will commands, and what knowledge directs, which three things in God are identified. Or we may say, that the knowledge or will of God, according as it is the effective principle, has the notion of power contained in it. Hence the consideration of the knowledge and will of God precedes the consideration of His power, as the cause precedes the operation and effect.

The adaptation of means to ends in the universe does not argue, as John Stuart Mill would have it, that the power of the designer is limited, but only that God has willed to manifest his glory by a world so constituted rather than by another. Indeed, the production of secondary causes, capable of accomplishing certain effects, requires greater power than the direct accomplishment of these same effects. On the other hand, even though no creature existed, God's power would not be barren, for "creatures are not an end to God". Regarding the deity's power, medieval theologians contended that there are certain things that even an omnipotent deity cannot do. The statement "a deity can do anything" is only sensible with an assumed suppressed clause, "that implies the perfection of true power". This standard scholastic answer allows that acts of creatures such as walking can be performed by humans but not by a deity. Rather than an advantage in power, human acts such as walking, sitting, or giving birth were possible only because of a defect in human power. The capacity to sin, for example, is not a power but a defect or infirmity. In response to questions of a deity performing impossibilities, e.g. making square circles, Aquinas says that "everything that does not imply a contradiction in terms, is numbered amongst those possible things, in respect of which God is called omnipotent: whereas whatever implies contradiction does not come within the scope of divine omnipotence, because it cannot have the aspect of possibility. Hence it is better to say that such things cannot be done, than that God cannot do them. Nor is this contrary to the word of the angel, saying: 'No word shall be impossible with God.' For whatever implies a contradiction cannot be a word, because no intellect can possibly conceive such a thing."

C. S. Lewis adopts a scholastic position in the course of his work The Problem of Pain. Lewis follows Aquinas' view on contradiction:

His Omnipotence means power to do all that is intrinsically possible, not to do the intrinsically impossible. You may attribute miracles to him, but not nonsense. This is no limit to his power. If you choose to say "God can give a creature free will and at the same time withhold free will from it," you have not succeeded in saying anything about God: meaningless combinations of words do not suddenly acquire meaning simply because we prefix to them the two other words 'God can.' ... It is no more possible for God than for the weakest of his creatures to carry out both of two mutually exclusive alternatives; not because his power meets an obstacle, but because nonsense remains nonsense even when we talk it about God.

=== As a stage of normal child development ===
Sigmund Freud freely used the same term in a comparable way. Referring with respect to an adult neurotic to "the omnipotence which he ascribed to his thoughts and feelings", Freud reckoned that "this belief is a frank acknowledgement of a relic of the old megalomania of infancy". Similarly Freud concluded that "we can detect an element of megalomania in most other forms of paranoic disorder. We are justified in assuming that this megalomania is essentially of an infantile nature and that, as development proceeds, it is sacrificed to social considerations". Freud saw megalomania as an obstacle to psychoanalysis. In the second half of the 20th century object relations theory, both in the United States and among British Kleinians, set about "rethinking megalomania ... intent on transforming an obstacle ... into a complex organization that linked object relations and defence mechanisms" in such a way as to offer new "prospects for therapy".

Edmund Bergler, one of his early followers, considered that "as Freud and Ferenczi have shown, the child lives in a sort of megalomania for a long period; he knows only one yardstick, and that is his own over-inflated ego ... megalomania, it must be understood, is normal in the very young child". Bergler was of the opinion that in later life "the activity of gambling in itself unconsciously activates the megalomania and grandiosity of childhood, reverting to the 'fiction of omnipotence'".

Heinz Kohut regarded "the narcissistic patient's "megalomania" as a part of normal development.

D. W. Winnicott took a more positive view of a belief in early omnipotence, seeing it as essential to the child's well-being; and "good-enough" mothering as essential to enable the child to "cope with the immense shock of loss of omnipotence"—as opposed to whatever "prematurely forces it out of its narcissistic universe".

== Rejection or limitation ==
Some monotheists reject the view that a deity is or could be omnipotent, or take the view that, by choosing to create creatures with free will, a deity has chosen to limit divine omnipotence. In Conservative and Reform Judaism, and some movements within Protestant Christianity, including open theism, deities are said to act in the world through persuasion, and not by coercion (this is a matter of choice—a deity could act miraculously, and perhaps on occasion does so—while for process theism it is a matter of necessity—creatures have inherent powers that a deity cannot, even in principle, override). Deities are manifested in the world through inspiration and the creation of possibility, not necessarily by miracles or violations of the laws of nature.

=== Philosophical grounds ===
Process theology rejects unlimited omnipotence on a philosophical basis, arguing that omnipotence as classically understood would be less than perfect, and is therefore incompatible with the idea of a perfect deity. The idea is grounded in Plato's oft-overlooked statement that "being is power".

My notion would be, that anything which possesses any sort of power to affect another, or to be affected by another, if only for a single moment, however trifling the cause and however slight the effect, has real existence; and I hold that the definition of being is simply power.

— Plato, 247E

From this premise, Charles Hartshorne argues further that:

Power is influence, and perfect power is perfect influence ... power must be exercised upon something, at least if by power we mean influence, control; but the something controlled cannot be absolutely inert, since the merely passive, that which has no active tendency of its own, is nothing; yet if the something acted upon is itself partly active, then there must be some resistance, however slight, to the "absolute" power, and how can power which is resisted be absolute?

— Hartshorne, 89

The argument can be stated as follows:

1. If a being exists, then it must have some active tendency.
2. If a being has some active tendency, then it has some power to resist its creator.
3. If a being has the power to resist its creator, then the creator does not have absolute power.

For example, although someone might control a lump of jelly-pudding almost completely, the inability of that pudding to stage any resistance renders that person's power rather unimpressive. Power can only be said to be great if it is over something that has defenses and its own agenda. If a deity's power is to be great, it must therefore be over beings that have at least some of their own defenses and agenda. Thus, if a deity does not have absolute power, it must therefore embody some of the characteristics of power, and some of the characteristics of persuasion. This view is known as dipolar theism.

The most popular works espousing this point are from Harold Kushner (in Judaism). The need for a modified view of omnipotence was also articulated by Alfred North Whitehead in the early 20th century and expanded upon by Charles Hartshorne. Hartshorne proceeded within the context of the theological system known as process theology.

Thomas Jay Oord argues that omnipotence dies a death of a thousand philosophical qualifications. To make any sense, the word must undergo various logical, ontological, mathematical, theological, and existential qualifications so that it loses specificity.

=== Scriptural grounds ===
In the Authorized King James Version of the Bible, as well as several other versions, in Revelation 19:6 it is stated "the Lord God omnipotent reigneth" (Ancient Greek: παντοκράτωρ, romanized: pantokrator, "all-mighty").

Thomas Jay Oord argues that omnipotence is not found in the Hebrew and Greek scriptures. The Hebrew words Shaddai (breasts) and Sabaoth (hosts) are wrongly translated as "God almighty" or "divine omnipotence". Pantokrator, the Greek word in the New Testament and Septuagint often translated in English as "almighty", actually means "all-holding" rather than almighty or omnipotent. Oord offers an alternative view of divine power he calls "amipotence", which is the maximal power of God's uncontrolling love.

== Uncertainty ==
In the view of René Descartes, trying to develop a theory to explain, assign or reject omnipotence on grounds of logic has little merit, since being omnipotent, in the sense in which Descartes used the word, would mean the omnipotent being is above logic. He explains this idea in his Meditations on First Philosophy. This view is called universal possibilism.

According to Hindu philosophy the essence of Brahman can never be understood or known since Brahman is beyond both existence and non-existence, transcending and including time, causation and space, and thus can never be known in the same material sense as one traditionally "understands" a given concept or object.

== See also ==
- Counterdependency
- Criminals from a sense of guilt
- Omnipotence paradox
- Theodicy
