= Paula R. Pietromonaco =

American psychologist

Paula R. Pietromonaco is an American psychologist known for her research on adult attachment, close relationships, and health.

== Career ==
Pietromonaco received the 2019 Award for Distinguished Service on Behalf of Social and Personality Psychology from the Society for Personality and Social Psychology.

Pietromonaco has served in various editorial capacities for psychological journals, including as editor-in-chief of Emotion, associate editor of the Journal of Personality and Social Psychology, and associate editor of Psychological Science. As the editor-in-chief of Emotion, Pietromonaco stated her intent to prioritize research on affective processes and emotion, and encouraged submissions connecting different subdisciplines and fields. She also continued the journal's emphasis on diverse methodologies.

== Research ==
Pietromonaco's research areas are:

- Attachment and health-related physiological stress processes
- Interpersonal mechanisms linking close relationships to health
- Impact of stressors (including the COVID-19 pandemic) on couples' relationship functioning
- Impact of cultural orientations (independence vs. interdependence) on couple processes

Pietromonaco obtained a grant from the National Cancer Institute for her project "Biopsychosocial Factors in Depression and Marriage: Implications for Cancer" (2008-2016).
