= John Oldham (psychiatrist) =

American psychiatrist

John M. Oldham
- Education: Duke University Baylor College of Medicine
- Occupation: Psychiatrist
- Years active: 21+
- Organization: American College of Psychiatrists American Psychiatric Association Benjamin Rush Society International Society for the Study of Personality Disorders
- Known for: Research into Personality disorders
- Spouse: Karen Oldham

John M. Oldham is an American psychiatrist who is a distinguished emeritus professor at the Baylor College of Medicine.

== Education ==
He received as Bachelor of Science degree from Duke University, a Master of Science in Engineering and a Master of Medicine in neuroendocrinology from the Baylor College of Medicine. He also worked as an intern at the Icahn School of Medicine at Mount Sinai and received his postgraduate training at Columbia University and the New York Presbyterian Hospital. John would also receive psychoanalytic training at the Columbia Psychoanalytic Center. Oldham also has a diploma in psychiatry and forensic psychiatry.

== Positions ==
He is a member of the American College of Psychiatrists, American Psychiatric Association, Benjamin Rush Society, International Society for the Study of Personality Disorders, and he is a fellow of the Royal College of Physicians of Edinburgh. John Oldham was also the Chief of Staff and Senior Vice President of the Menninger Foundation and a former president of the APA, ACP, and the Association for Research on Personality Disorders. He headed the New York State Office of Mental Health and was and executive director and a chairman of the department of psychiatry and behavioral sciences at the Institute of Psychiatry in the Medical University of Charleston. Today, Oldham serves as the treasurer of the American College of Psychiatrists, the president of the South Carolina Psychiatric Association, he represents the American Psychiatric Association in the American Medical Association, and he works as the distinguished emeritus professor at the Menninger Department of Psychiatry and Behavioral Sciences in the Baylor College of Medicine

== Research ==
He, along with Lois B. Morris developed the NPSP25. Oldham also studies personality disorders, and works as a psychiatrist seeking patients with Anorexia, anxiety, bipolar disorder, binge eating disorder, ADHD, AVPD, BDD, and ASPD. Oldham has published over 200 journal articles and books on these subjects and is internationally recognized as a leading figure in the psychiatric community. He is the editor of the Journal of Psychiatric Practice, the joint editor of Journal of Personality Disorders, and the joint editor-in-chief of Borderline Personality Disorder and Emotion Dysregulation.

Oldham published a letter on Psychiatric News and The New York Times on July 15, 2011, where he warned about the risks of complex and serious cases of mental illness. His publication was reposted by APA a week later, on July 22, 2011, when a a psychiatrist was murdered by a patient in McLean, Virginia, who then killed herself.
