= Allen Frances =

American psychiatrist (born 1942)

Allen J. Frances
- Born: October 2, 1942 (age 84); New York City, New York, US
- Education: Columbia College (1963); SUNY Downstate College of Medicine (1967)
- Occupation: psychiatrist

Allen J. Frances (born 2 October 1942) is an American psychiatrist. He is currently Professor and Chairman Emeritus of the Department of Psychiatry and Behavioral Sciences at Duke University School of Medicine. He is best known for serving as chair of the American Psychiatric Association task force overseeing the development and revision of the fourth edition of the Diagnostic and Statistical Manual of Mental Disorders (DSM-IV). Frances is the founding editor of two well-known psychiatric journals: the Journal of Personality Disorders and the Journal of Psychiatric Practice.

During the development of the current diagnostic manual, DSM-5, Frances became critical of the expanding boundaries of psychiatry and the medicalization of normal human behavior, problems he contends are leading to the overdiagnosis and overtreatment of the "worried well" and the gross undertreatment of the severely ill. In recent years, Frances has become a vocal advocate for improved treatment and societal conditions for the seriously mentally ill, the appropriate use of electroconvulsive therapy in severe cases of mental disorder, and an integrated, biopsychosocial approach to psychiatry.

Frances is the author or co-author of multiple books within the fields of psychiatry and psychology, including: Differential Therapeutics (1984), Your Mental Health (1999), Saving Normal (2013), Essentials of Psychiatric Diagnosis (2013), and Twilight of American Sanity (2017).

== Education and career ==
=== Education ===
Frances was born and raised in New York City, US. He received his bachelor's degree from Columbia College in 1963 and his medical degree in 1967 from SUNY Downstate College of Medicine. He graduated from the psychiatry residency training program at the New York State Psychiatric Institute in 1971 and received a certificate in psychoanalytic medicine from Columbia University Center for Psychoanalytic Training and Research in 1978. His research in the fields of psychiatry and behavioral sciences focused on schizophrenia, personality disorders, anxiety disorders, mood disorders, and clinical treatment of psychiatric patients.

=== Career ===
Frances began his professional journey at Cornell University Medical College, where he advanced to the position of professor. During his tenure, headed the outpatient department, provided patient care, delivered lectures, established a brief therapy program, and developed research specialty clinics for schizophrenia, depression, anxiety disorders, and AIDS. Throughout his academic tenure, Frances was an engaged researcher and prolific writer, contributing significantly in various clinical fields, including personality disorders, chronic depression, anxiety disorders, schizophrenia, AIDS, and psychotherapy. In 1991, he assumed the role of Chairman of the Department of Psychiatry at Duke University School of Medicine, where he played a key role in expanding the research, training, and clinical initiatives established by his predecessor, Dr. Bernard Carroll.

=== Research ===
Frances had originally viewed himself as a teacher and clinician but his administrative posts—as director of an outpatient department, chair of a psychiatry department, and chair of the DSM-IV Task Force—thrust him into more of a research role. He was an early organizer of outpatient services based on a given psychiatric disorder, providing expert clinical services and enriched research environments. In all, Frances received a dozen research grants as principal or co-principal investigator, most from the National Institute of Mental Health and published extensively on personality disorders, chronic depression, schizophrenia, anxiety disorders, the psychiatric aspects of AIDS, and various aspects of psychiatric diagnosis. He also mentored the careers of many other researchers.

=== Publications ===
Frances' book on Differential Therapeutics (1984) tried to bring specificity and evidence to decisions on how best to match patient and treatment. His recognition of therapeutic limits resulted in the 1981 paper No Treatment as the Prescription of Choice. Frances was the founding editor of two journals that have become standards: The Journal of Personality Disorders and the Journal of Psychiatric Practice.

In 2013, Allen Frances wrote a paper entitled "The New Crisis of Confidence in Psychiatric Diagnosis", which said that "psychiatric diagnosis still relies exclusively on fallible subjective judgments rather than objective biological tests". Frances was also concerned about "unpredictable overdiagnosis".

== The Diagnostic and Statistical Manual of Mental Disorders ==
=== DSM-III ===
Robert Spitzer, later the major force behind DSM-III, was one of Frances' teachers during his psychiatric residency at Columbia University and attempted to recruit him to participate in his research developing standardized criteria for mental disorders and interviewing instruments for diagnostic assessment. Frances declined the offer because he felt psychiatric treatment was much more interesting than psychiatric classification. Ten years later, in 1977, Spitzer attempted to recruit Frances again, this time to join his work on DSM-III. Frances accepted and was given three roles. He wrote the final draft of the personality disorders section of DSM-III; served as DSM-III liaison to the American Psychoanalytic Association and the Academy of Psychoanalysts; and he was a member of the team that delivered DSM-III educational conferences across the country. He wrote a number of papers on the uses and misuses of DSM-III and predicted DSM would eventually adopt a dimensional model of personality disorder diagnosis.

=== DSM-IV ===
Frances was appointed Chair of the DSM-IV Task Force in 1987. His selection followed his role as one of the major advisors for DSM-IIIR and reflected concerns within the American Psychiatric Association that new disorders were being added without sufficient evidence and that definitions of existing disorders were too loose. Frances was known as a diagnostic conservative who would promote stability in the system and discourage its rapid expansion across the fuzzy boundary into normality. He introduced a thorough three-stage vetting system to discourage diagnostic exuberance in DSM-IV: 1.) a thorough review of the existing literature had to produce compelling evidence in support of the suggested change; 2.) funding from the MacArthur Foundation allowed dozens of reanalyses of unpublished data sets to help answer questions pertinent to DSM-IV changes; and 3.) NIMH funding allowed for 11 field trials assessing how proposed changes would translate into clinical practice. The conservatism seemed to work. Of the 94 new diagnoses suggested for DSM-IV, only two were accepted: Asperger's syndrome and bipolar II disorder. Both had good supporting literature and both had performed well in field trials. However, Frances argued that any change in DSM-IV that could be misused, would be misused, and both changes led to unfortunate fads of wild overdiagnosis. Frances argues that there was also a fad of attention deficit/hyperactivity disorder partly due to loosened diagnostic criteria but mostly due to pharmaceutical company marketing.

=== DSM-5 ===
The next revision DSM-5 was initiated with a 2002 book (A Research Agenda for DSM-V) questioning the utility of the atheoretical, descriptive paradigm and suggesting a neuroscience research agenda aiming to develop a pathophysiologically based classification. After a series of symposiums, the task force began to work on the manual itself. In June 2008, Dr. Robert Spitzer who chaired the DSM-III and DSM-IIIR revisions had begun to write about the secrecy of the DSM-V Task Force (DSM-V: Open and Transparent?). Frances initially declined to join Spitzer's criticism, but after learning about the changes being considered, he wrote an article in July 2009 (A Warning Sign on the Road to DSM-V: Beware of Its Unintended Consequences) expressing multiple concerns including the unsupported paradigm shift, a failure to specify the level of empirical support needed for changes, their lack of openness, their ignoring the negative consequences of their proposals, a failure to meet timelines, and anticipate the coming time pressures. The APA/DSM-V Task Force response dismissed his complaints.

In March 2010, Frances began a weekly blog in Psychology Today, DSM-5 in Distress: The DSM's impact on mental health practice and research, often cross-posted in the Psychiatric Times and the Huffington Post. While many of his blog posts were about the DSM-5 Task Force lowering the thresholds for diagnosing existing disorders (attention deficit disorder, autism, addictions, personality disorders, bipolar II disorder), he was also disturbed by the addition of new speculative disorders (Attenuated Psychosis Syndrome, Disruptive Mood Dysregulation Disorder, Somatic Symptom Disorder). He has argued that the diagnosis attenuated psychosis syndrome promoted by advocates of early intervention for psychosis, such as Australian psychiatrist Patrick McGorry, is risky because of a high rate of inaccuracy, the potential to stigmatize young people given this label, the lack of any effective treatment, and the risk of children and adolescents being given dangerous antipsychotic medication. The elimination of the bereavement exclusion from the diagnosis of major depressive disorder was another particular concern, threatening to label normal grief as a mental illness.

So while the task force was focusing on early detection and treatment, Frances cautioned about diagnostic inflation, overmedication, and crossing the boundary of normality. Besides the original complaint that the DSM-5 Task Force was a closed process, Frances pointed out that they were behind schedule and even with a one-year postponement, they had to drop a follow-up quality control step. He recommended further postponement and advocated asking an outside body to review their work to make suggestions. While the American Psychiatric Association did have an internal review, they rejected his suggestion of an external consultation. When the field testing for inter-rater reliability was released in May 2012, several of the more contested disorders were eliminated as unreliable (attenuated psychosis syndrome, mixed anxiety depression) and the reliabilities were generally disappointing. The APA Board of Trustees eliminated a complex "Cross-Cutting" Dimensional System, but many of the contested areas remained when the document was approved for printing in December 2012 for a scheduled release in May 2013. There were widespread threats of a boycott.

Frances's writings were joined by a general criticism of the DSM-5 revision, ultimately resulting in a petition calling for outside review signed by 14,000 and sponsored by 56 mental health organizations. In the course of almost three years of blogging, Frances became a voice for more than just the specifics of the DSM-5. He spoke out against the overuse of psychiatric medications—particularly in children; a general trend towards global diagnostic inflation—pathologizing normality; the intrusion of the pharmaceutical industry into psychiatric practice; and a premature attempt to move psychiatry to an exclusively biological paradigm without scientific justification. Along the way, he wrote two books: Saving Normal: An Insider's Revolt Against Out-of-Control Psychiatric Diagnosis, DSM-5, Big Pharma, and the Medicalization of Ordinary Life (2013), and Essentials of Psychiatric Diagnosis (2013), meant to guide clinicians and to help curb unwarranted diagnostic exuberance. He has decided to continue writing on a new Psychology Today blog called Saving Normal.

== Major contentions ==
=== Neglecting severe mental illness ===
Frances contends that while the deinstitutionalization movement was needed due to hospital overcrowding, frequent civil liberties violations, and poor conditions for hospitalized psychiatric patients, its implementation in the United States was an utter failure. In 2018, he wrote,

The money saved from closing the custodial state hospitals was often misallocated to tax cuts and prison construction—depriving the mentally ill of adequate community treatment and housing. The result has been a broken American mental health "non-system" that overtreats the worried well and vastly undertreats the seriously mentally ill. Instead of 600,000 in state hospitals, we now have 350,000 mentally ill in prison and 250,000 homeless—because the vast majority is unable to obtain decent housing and access to treatment.

Frances asserts that psychiatry itself has contributed to the neglect of the severely ill by diverting limited resources away from the community treatment of these patients and focusing instead on genetics research, neuroscience research, and the treatment of the mildly ill. He is particularly critical of NIMH spending excesses in the field of neuroscience, which he says have not helped a single patient in actual life. He is a proponent of a community psychiatry approach.

He argues for the limited and safeguarded use of involuntary psychiatric hospitalization, writing that it is far preferable to the all-too-common alternatives: homelessness and imprisonment.

=== Overtreating the worried well ===
Frances argues that with the gradual expansion of the DSM diagnostic system, psychiatry's attention has shifted away from the severely mentally ill and towards the treatment of the mildly ill or "worried well." This has led to several "false epidemics" of mental disorder, including autism and childhood bipolar disorder. He writes extensively about the pathologization of normal human behavior in his book Saving Normal, and provides guidance to clinicians to avoid these pitfalls in Essentials of Psychiatric Diagnosis. During the DSM-5 revision process, he was particularly critical of the concepts of psychosis risk syndrome, binge eating disorder, and mild neurocognitive disorder.

=== Controversial treatments ===
Frances is a proponent of the safe and appropriate use of electroconvulsive therapy in severe and treatment-resistant cases of mental disorder; the use of lithium therapy for bipolar disorder; and the use of clozapine for schizophrenia. Regarding electroconvulsive therapy, Frances argues that the treatment can be lifesaving in cases of severe, unrelenting depression and in some other psychiatric disorders, such as malignant, or lethal, catatonia. He has repeatedly asserted that if he were severely depressed, he would agree to electroconvulsive treatment.

Frances has expressed his belief that both lithium carbonate and clozapine are underutilized in the treatment of bipolar disorder and schizophrenia, respectively, often in favor of newer, more profitable second-generation antipsychotic drugs. The current consensus in global psychiatry is that both lithium and clozapine remain the most effective agents in the treatment of their respective conditions; among academic psychiatrists, their underutilization is widely recognized.

Frances has expressed skepticism over the use of ketamine in the treatment of clinical depression, writing that even if it is narrowly indicated in treatment-resistant mood disorder, "ketamine promotionals will encourage many people to start using it as self-medication for distress–a practice that is filled with risk and falls far outside any possible reasonable use of ketamine."

=== Binding advance directives ===
Frances has advocated for the widespread use of binding advanced directives allowing patients to determine when they are well what treatments they would like to receive should they have a psychotic relapse. Most psychiatric patients are competent to decide whether or not they want treatment and to pick which treatments they prefer from the available alternatives—but patients with acute psychotic disorders often temporarily lose this capacity and refuse desperately needed treatment to help prevent imprisonment or homelessness. Studies show that most patients with bipolar disorder, once recovered, realize their judgment was dangerously impaired during past acute episodes and welcome the chance to plan advanced directives for involuntary treatment, should this be needed during future episodes. Giving others permission in advance to impose treatment, should it become necessary, takes away much of the anger, mistrust, helplessness, and humiliation patients feel when they have no say in their fate.

Frances argues that advanced directives are perhaps the only intervention in psychiatry that is without a downside. Relapses are much shorter and less harmful when treated promptly. Accepting that future relapses can occur provides patients with the strongest possible incentive to reduce their probability by participating fully in preventive disease management. And ideological and legal controversies about the role of coercion in psychiatry usually dissolve in the cooperation forged by jointly facing clinical reality.

Frances contends that advanced directives make sense for patients who have previously required involuntary treatment. Discussion of advanced directives might help restore a fractured therapeutic relationship by explaining why the coercion seemed necessary in the past and suggesting how it can be avoided in the future. It is more of a case-by-case decision whether to discuss directives with patients who have never before opposed treatment—directives most indicated for those whose acute episodes are severe, dangerous, frequent, and prolonged. The best time to begin discussing advanced directives is soon after insight returns following an acute episode and it is almost always helpful to include family in the discussion.

=== On psychotherapy and psychoanalysis ===
Trained as a psychoanalyst, Frances taught the Freud course at the Columbia Psychoanalytic Center for a decade starting in the late 1970s. He has said that his "favorite work activity throughout [his] career was doing and teaching psychodynamic psychotherapy." Some of his early work was on the study and treatment of personality disorder.

Frances contends that guild wars within psychotherapy have hurt the profession and those it treats; like Marvin Goldfried, he is a proponent of psychotherapy integration. He has said that the biggest mistake made by American psychoanalysis was their rejection of Aaron Beck's cognitive behavior therapy. Regarding Freud, Frances has said that Freud was "overvalued in his day and is now undervalued in ours."

=== Biopsychosocial model ===
Frances is a proponent of George Engel's biopsychosocial model of mental disorder, writing that the "biopsychosocial model of mental illness and mental health care created a conceptual underpinning of psychiatric practice." Frances is critical of reductionistic theories in psychiatry and psychology; in any mental disorder, biological, psychological, and social factors are working in tandem to create and maintain dysfunction.

=== No treatment as a treatment of choice ===
During his residency training, Frances became dismayed at the long length of hospital stays and overtreatment with psychiatric drugs. Later, as head of the outpatient department at Cornell, Frances noted that many patients failed to benefit from treatment, and some seemed to be harmed by it. This led to his 1982 paper, "No Treatment as the Prescription of Choice," and his career-long efforts to warn clinicians against overdiagnosis and overtreatment.

=== On antipsychiatry ===
Frances has much in common with critics of psychiatry who oppose overdiagnosis and overtreatment, but is much opposed to those who preach that psychiatric treatment is always harmful and never necessary. He frequently debated antipsychiatrists at conferences and in print, arguing that treatments overvalued to the many were essential to the few. The five percent of the population with severe mental illness do not do well without medication and often wind up in jail or living on the streets unless treatment is provided. He believes that antipsychiatry is a useful check against psychiatric overreach but that it is extremely harmful when it discourages patients from getting the treatment they need.

=== Views on artificial intelligence and psychiatry ===
In 2025, Frances began writing extensively about the potential impact of artificial intelligence (AI) on psychiatry and psychotherapy. In a series of essays and public statements, he argued that AI will soon transform both psychiatric diagnosis and psychotherapy, for better and for worse.

In The British Journal of Psychiatry, Frances warned that "AI chatbots will soon dominate psychotherapy," noting their fluency, ubiquity, and growing popularity among patients. While acknowledging their usefulness for everyday concerns and expanding access to care, he cautioned that chatbots pose serious risks for individuals with complex psychiatric disorders, who require nuanced clinical judgment and a therapeutic relationship that AI cannot replicate.

In other writings, Frances predicts that AI systems, with their vast databases and superior pattern recognition, will eventually outperform human clinicians in diagnostic accuracy. He emphasized advantages such as reproducibility, cross-cultural applicability, and dimensional assessment, but also identified dangers including algorithmic errors, lack of regulation, privacy breaches, and the risk of professional deskilling. Frances compares psychiatry's situation to radiology, where clinicians have adapted by collaborating with AI rather than being replaced by it. He urged psychiatrists to carve out roles emphasizing human strengths (such as clinical coordination, contextual understanding, and the therapeutic relationship) to avoid obsolescence.

Frances has increasingly advocated a hybrid model of mental health care in which human clinicians and chatbots work together, each contributing different strengths and compensating for the other's limitations. He argues that clinicians should learn to incorporate chatbots into treatment rather than simply compete with them, while retaining responsibility for clinical judgment, patient safety, and the therapeutic relationship. He has cautioned that autonomous chatbot therapy may be particularly unsafe for patients with severe psychiatric disorders and has emphasized the continuing importance of human clinicians in such cases. Frances develops these themes further in his forthcoming book, The Clinician's Survival Guide to the Chatbot Revolution, to be published by Guilford Press.

Beyond journal publications, Frances has frequently raised these concerns in public forums and on social media, warning of the unregulated expansion of AI and calling for international professional bodies to advocate for safety, oversight, and ethical standards in its application to mental health care.

== Psychotherapy ==
Throughout his career, Frances has maintained that psychotherapy represents a core, foundational skill in the practice of clinical psychiatry. He counts, among others, Silvano Arieti, Sherv Frazier, Nathan Ackerman, Lawrence Kolb, John Talbott, Leon Salzman, Howard Hunt, Harold Searles, Aaron Beck, and Marsha Linehan as his favorite mentors on psychotherapy. While initially trained in psychoanalysis, Frances gained exposure to a variety of therapeutic models and techniques and has said that his proudest career activity was serving on the NIMH committee that in the 1980s funded the early studies on cognitive behavioral therapy and dialectical behavioral therapy. He has argued that this research has helped many more millions of people than much of the fascinating but clinically useless biological research undertaken by NIMH in recent decades.

Although Frances was trained as a psychoanalyst and taught a course on Freudian theory for a decade, he is a supporter of brief psychotherapy as the treatment of choice for most patients. He has stated that this is informed by a public health concern that everyone who needs help should have quick and easy access to treatment. He has also said that this comes from the experience that brief therapy is effective for most milder problems and is what most patients prefer. He bases this partly on the utilitarian dictum of the greatest good for the greatest number. Frances also feels that brief therapy is a training device allowing acquisition of cognitive, behavioral, psychodynamic, and family systems techniques.

In a 2023 interview on his career as a psychotherapist, Frances stressed the importance of differential diagnosis in psychotherapy; the importance of theoretical pluralism and technical flexibility; the healing power of the therapeutic relationship; and the value of clinical supervision and personal psychotherapy. He advised early-career therapists to treat patients across the psychiatric diagnostic spectrum, including severely ill patients; to learn the basics of psychopharmacology, including its limitations; and to gain life experience in a variety of ways, including reading literature, falling in love, and traveling, in order to become a more well-rounded therapist. Frances says that his patients were his best teachers and he is grateful to them not only for making him a better therapist but also a better person.

Since 2022, he has co-hosted with psychologist Marvin Goldfried a podcast titled Talking Therapy, which covers a wide range of topics on psychotherapy and is available on Youtube.

== Book and statements on Donald Trump ==
Frances wrote a 2017 book, titled, Twilight of American Sanity, in which he asserts that Trump himself does not have a mental disease, but rather that the problem lies with the American people for selecting him as U.S. President. Frances writes in the book: "Calling Trump crazy allows us to avoid confronting the craziness in our society." The Washington Post found the arguments made by Frances in the book stray from medical to political in nature. Publishers Weekly said the book contained factual errors and exaggeration. Kirkus Reviews said the work "helps explain why and how the Trump presidency happened."

In August 2019, Frances stated that "Trump is as destructive a person in this century, as Adolf Hitler, Joseph Stalin and Mao Zedong were in the last century. He may be responsible for many more million deaths than they were. He needs to be contained, but he needs to be contained by attacking his policies, not his person." Frances posted a follow-up to Twitter in which he asserted his comments referred to the potential future impact of climate change. In their analysis of his comments, Politifact reported that a 2011 calculation by Yale University history professor Timothy Snyder said Hitler killed over 11 million people, and the U.S. Holocaust Memorial Museum estimated about 17 million deaths attributed to Hitler. Politifact also cited author Ian Johnson, who found Mao Zedong responsible for approximately 42.5 million fatalities in his book The Souls of China: The Return of Religion After Mao. Politifact concluded that: "Not only does Frances' comparison exaggerate the predicted climate change death toll compared to that of the dictators, he also lays the blame for potential future deaths at Trump's feet alone, which even experts critical of Trump consider wrongheaded," and rated his statement as "Pants on Fire".

In a further clarification statement to Snopes, who analyzed his assertions, Frances reiterated that he was referring to the potential future impact of climate change, stating; "I think it is no exaggeration to worry that the policies that follow from Trump's reckless climate denial may wind up causing the death of hundreds of millions of people. Our species appears to be on a path to self-destruction, and Trump is enthusiastically leading the way."
