= Theodore Millon =

American psychologist (1928–2014)

- Born: August 18, 1928; Brooklyn, New York City, U.S.
- Died: January 29, 2014 (aged 85); Greenville, New York, U.S.

Theodore Millon (/mɪˈlɒn/) (August 18, 1928 – January 29, 2014) was an American psychologist known for his work on personality disorders. He founded the Journal of Personality Disorders and was the inaugural president of the International Society for the Study of Personality Disorders. In 2008 he was awarded the Gold Medal Award For Life Achievement in the Application of Psychology by the American Psychiatric Association and the American Psychological Foundation named the "Theodore Millon Award in Personality Psychology" after him. Millon developed the Millon Clinical Multiaxial Inventory, worked on the diagnostic criteria for passive-aggressive personality disorder, worked on editions of the Diagnostic and Statistical Manual of Mental Disorders, and developed subtypes of a variety of personality disorders.

== Biography ==
Millon was born in Brooklyn in 1928, the only child of immigrant Jewish parents from Lithuania and Poland. His 19th-century ancestors came from the town of Valozhyn, then a part of the Russian Empire (now Belarus). He studied psychology, physics, and philosophy as an undergraduate at the City College of New York and went on to receive his PhD from the University of Connecticut in 1954, with a dissertation on "the authoritarian personality."

Millon was a member of the board of trustees of Allentown State Hospital, a large Pennsylvania psychiatric hospital for 15 years. Shortly thereafter he became the founding editor of the Journal of Personality Disorders and the inaugural president of the International Society for the Study of Personality Disorders. He was Professor Emeritus at Harvard Medical School and the University of Miami.

In 2008, Millon was awarded the Gold Medal Award For Life Achievement in the Application of Psychology by the American Psychological Association. The American Psychological Foundation presents an award named after Millon, known as the "Theodore Millon Award in Personality Psychology," to honor outstanding psychologists engaged in "advancing the science of personality psychology including the areas of personology, personality theory, personality disorders, and personality measurement."

== Theoretical work ==
Millon has written numerous popular works on personality, developed diagnostic questionnaire tools such as the Millon Clinical Multiaxial Inventory, and contributed to the development of earlier versions of the Diagnostic and Statistical Manual of Mental Disorders.

Among other diagnoses, Millon advocated for an expanded version of passive aggressive personality disorder, which he termed 'negativistic' personality disorder and argued could be diagnosed by criteria such as "expresses envy and resentment toward those apparently more fortunate" and "claims to be luckless, ill-starred, and jinxed in life; personal content is more a matter of whining and grumbling than of feeling forlorn and despairing" (APA, 1991, R17). Passive-Aggressive Personality Disorder was expanded somewhat as an official diagnosis in the DSM-III-R but then relegated to the appendix of DSM-IV, tentatively renamed 'Passive-Aggressive (Negativistic) Personality Disorder'.

=== Millon's personality disorder subtypes ===
Millon devised a set of subtypes for each of the DSM personality disorders:

- Sadistic (psychopathic) personality disorder subtypes
- Self-defeating (masochistic) personality disorder subtypes
- Schizotypal personality disorder subtypes
- Schizoid personality disorder subtypes
- Paranoid personality disorder subtypes
- Antisocial (sociopathic) personality disorder subtypes
- Borderline personality disorder subtypes
- Histrionic personality disorder subtypes
- Narcissistic personality disorder subtypes
- Dependent personality disorder subtypes
- Obsessive-compulsive personality disorder subtypes
- Avoidant personality disorder subtypes
- Passive-aggressive (negativistic) personality disorder subtypes
- Depressive personality disorder subtypes
- Exuberant/Hypomanic (turbulent) personality disorder subtypes
- Decompensated Personality Disorder

=== Millon's personality disorder descriptions ===
Millon and other researchers consider some relegated diagnoses to be equally valid disorders, and may also propose other personality disorders or subtypes, including mixtures of aspects of different categories of the officially accepted diagnoses. Millon proposed the following description of personality disorders:

Millon's brief description of personality disorders
Type of personality disorder	DSM-5 inclusion	Description
Paranoid	Yes	Guarded, defensive, distrustful and suspicious. Hypervigilant to the motives of others to undermine or do harm. Always seeking confirmatory evidence of hidden schemes. Feel righteous, but persecuted. Experience a pattern of pervasive distrust and suspicion of others that lasts a long time. They are generally difficult to work with and are very hard to form relationships with. They are also known to be argumentative and hypersensitive.
Schizoid	Yes	Apathetic, indifferent, remote, solitary, distant, humorless, contempt, odd fantasies. Neither desire nor need human attachments. Withdrawn from relationships and prefer to be alone. Little interest in others, often seen as a loner. Minimal awareness of the feelings of themselves or others. Few drives or ambitions, if any. Is an uncommon condition in which people avoid social activities and consistently shy away from interaction with others. It affects more males than females. To others, they may appear somewhat dull or humorless. Because they do not tend to show emotion, they may appear as though they do not care about what's going on around them.
Schizotypal	Yes	Eccentric, self-estranged, bizarre, absent. Exhibit peculiar mannerisms and behaviors. Think they can read thoughts of others. Preoccupied with odd daydreams and beliefs. Blur line between reality and fantasy. Magical thinking and strange beliefs. People with schizotypal personality disorder are often described as odd or eccentric and usually have few, if any, close relationships. They think others think negatively of them.
Antisocial	Yes	Impulsive, irresponsible, deviant, unruly. Act without due consideration. Meet social obligations only when self-serving. Disrespect societal customs, rules, and standards. See themselves as free and independent. People with antisocial personality disorder depict a long pattern of disregard for other people's rights. They often cross the line and violate these rights.
Borderline	Yes	Frantic efforts to avoid abandonment. Identity disturbance; unstable sense of self-image or sense of self. Impulsivity — spending, sex, substance abuse, binge eating. Unstable mood; fluctuation between highs and lows. Feelings of emptiness. Ideation and devaluation of interpersonal relationships. Intense or inappropriate anger. Suicidal-behaviour.
Histrionic	Yes	Hysteria, dramatic, seductive, shallow, egocentric, attention-seeking, vain. Overreact to minor events. Exhibitionistic as a means of securing attention and favors. See themselves as attractive and charming. Constantly seeking others' attention. Disorder is characterized by constant attention-seeking, emotional overreaction, and suggestibility. Their tendency to over-dramatize may impair relationships and lead to depression, but they are often high-functioning.
Narcissistic	Yes	Egotistical, arrogant, grandiose, insouciant. Preoccupied with fantasies of success, beauty, or achievement. See themselves as admirable and superior, and therefore entitled to special treatment. Is a mental disorder in which people have an inflated sense of their own importance and a deep need for admiration. Those with narcissistic personality disorder believe that they are superior to others and have little regard for other people's feelings.
Avoidant	Yes	Hesitant, self-conscious, embarrassed, anxious. Tense in social situations due to fear of rejection. Plagued by constant performance anxiety. See themselves as inept, inferior, or unappealing. They experience long-standing feelings of inadequacy and are very sensitive of what others think about them.
Dependent	Yes	Helpless, incompetent, submissive, immature. Withdrawn from adult responsibilities. See themselves as weak or fragile. Seek constant reassurance from stronger figures. They have the need to be taken care of by others. They fear being abandoned or separated from important people in their life.
Obsessive–compulsive	Yes	Restrained, conscientious, respectful, rigid. Maintain a rule-bound lifestyle. Adhere closely to social conventions. See the world in terms of regulations and hierarchies. See themselves as devoted, reliable, efficient, and productive.
Depressive	No	Somber, discouraged, pessimistic, brooding, fatalistic. Present themselves as vulnerable and abandoned. Feel valueless, guilty, and impotent. Judge themselves as worthy only of criticism and contempt. Hopeless, suicidal, restless. This disorder can lead to aggressive acts and hallucinations.
Passive–aggressive (Negativistic)	No	Resentful, contrary, skeptical, discontented. Resist fulfilling others' expectations. Deliberately inefficient. Vent anger indirectly by undermining others' goals. Alternately moody and irritable, then sullen and withdrawn. Withhold emotions. Will not communicate when there is something problematic to discuss.
Sadistic	No	Explosively hostile, abrasive, cruel, dogmatic. Liable to sudden outbursts of rage. Gain satisfaction through dominating, intimidating and humiliating others. They are opinionated and closed-minded. Enjoy performing brutal acts on others. Find pleasure in abusing others. Would likely engage in a sadomasochist relationship, but will not play the role of a masochist.
Self-defeating (Masochistic)	No	Deferential, pleasure-phobic, servile, blameful, self-effacing. Encourage others to take advantage of them. Deliberately defeat own achievements. Seek condemning or mistreatful partners. They are suspicious of people who treat them well. Would likely engage in a sadomasochist relationship.

== Books ==
- 1969: Modern Psychopathology: A Biosocial Approach to Maladaptive Learning and Functioning, Saunders
- 1981: Disorders of Personality: DSM-III: Axis II. John Wiley & Sons ISBN 0-471-06403-3
- 1985: (with George S. Everly, Jr.) Personality and Its Disorders. John Wiley and Sons ISBN 978-0471878162
- 1996: (with Roger D. Davis) Disorders of Personality: DSM IV and Beyond 2nd edition, John Wiley & Sons ISBN 0-471-01186-X
- 1974: (with Renée Millon) Abnormal behavior and personality: a biosocial learning approach, Saunders
- 2004: Personality Disorders in Modern Life, John Wiley and Sons. ISBN 0-471-23734-5
- 2004: Masters of the Mind: exploring the story of mental illness. John Wiley & Sons. ISBN 9780471469858
- 2007: (with Seth Grossman) Moderating Severe Personality Disorders: A Personalized Psychotherapy Approach, John Wiley & Sons.
- 2007: (with Seth Grossman) Resolving Difficult Clinical Syndromes: A Personalized Psychotherapy Approach, John Wiley & Sons.
- 2007: (with Seth Grossman) Overcoming Resistant Personality Disorders: A Personalized Psychotherapy Approach, John Wiley & Sons.
- 2008: (editor with Paul H. Blaney) Oxford Textbook of Psychopathology, 2nd Ed., Oxford University Press.
- 2008: (editor with Robert Krueger and Erik Simonsen) Contemporary Directions in Psychopathology: Toward the DSM-V and ICD-11, Guilford Press
- 2008: The Millon inventories: a practitioner's guide to personalized clinical assessment, Guilford Press ISBN 978-1-59385-674-8
- 2011: Disorders of Personality: Introducing a DSM/ICD Spectrum from Normal to Abnormal, 3rd edition John Wiley & Sons ISBN 0470040939

== See also ==
- Millon Clinical Multiaxial Inventory
- Pyotr Gannushkin (1875–1933) — a Russian psychiatrist who created a classification of personality disorders, then known as "psychopathies", that intersect in many respects with those of Theodore Millon.

== Sources ==
- Theodore Millon, a Student of Personality, Dies at 85, The New York Times, January 31, 2014.
