= Lynne Lamberg =

American science journalist

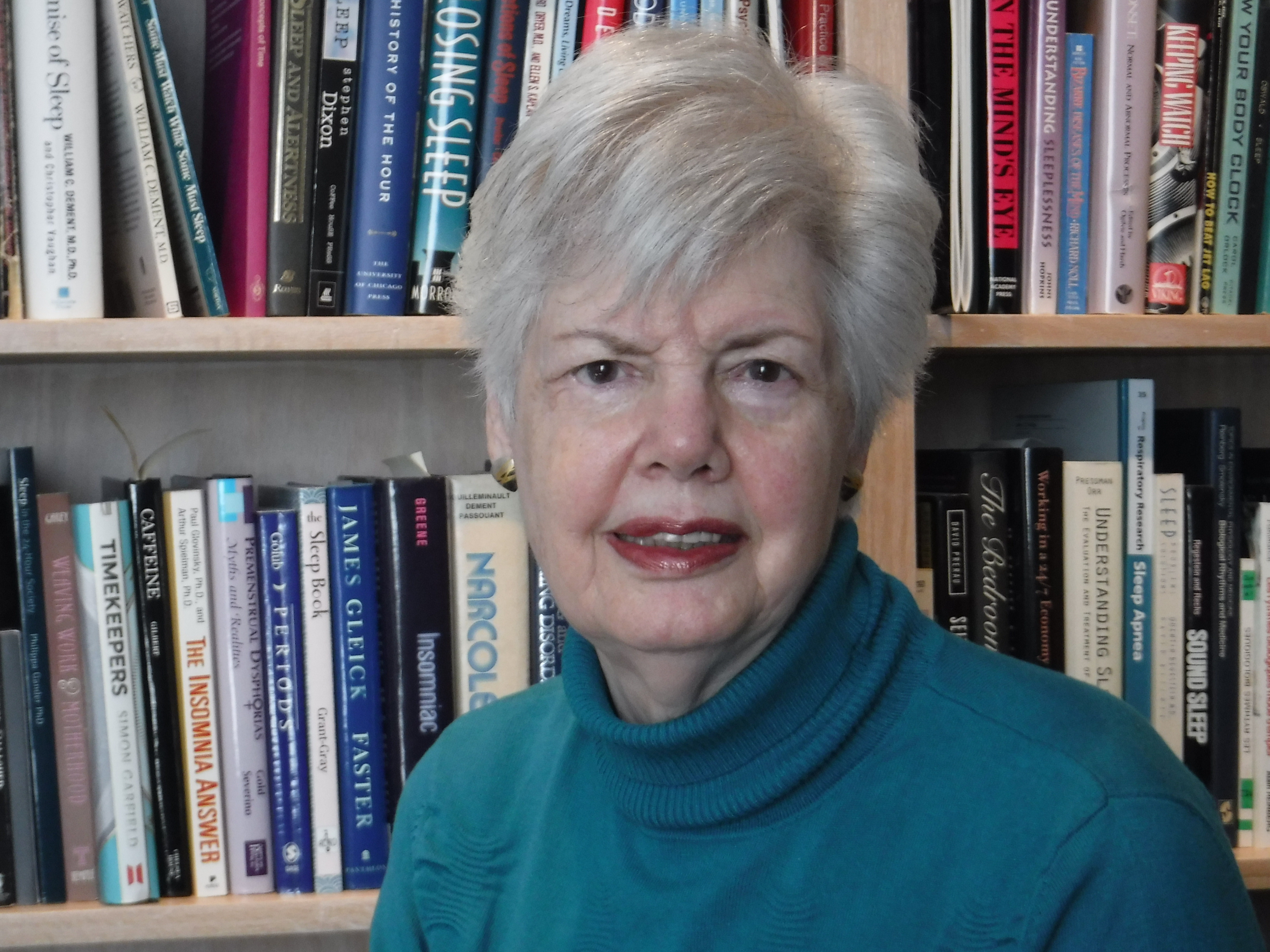
- Portrait by Stanford Lamberg
- Born: Lynne Sheila Friedman; 1942 (age 83–84); St. Louis, Missouri
- Education: University of Michigan; B.A., Washington University in St. Louis; M.A., Annenberg School for Communication at the University of Pennsylvania
- Occupations: Freelance science journalist, editor and author
- Spouse: Stanford Lamberg
- Writing career
- Genre: Journalism
- Subjects: Medicine and health

Lynne Lamberg (born 1942) is an American freelance science journalist, writer and editor. In addition to books on sleep, dreams, and biological rhythms, she has written hundreds of articles on mental and physical health for medical professionals and the general public.

== Early life and education ==
Lynne (Friedman) Lamberg, the daughter of Ralph M. and Fay G. (Bialick) Friedman, was born in St. Louis, Missouri, in 1942. After a year at the University of Michigan, she earned an A.B. degree in 1963 at Washington University in St. Louis, where she was a writer and editor for the campus newspaper, Student Life, and editor-in-chief of The Hatchet yearbook. She earned an M.A. in 1967 at the Annenberg School for Communication at the University of Pennsylvania. She married Stanford I. Lamberg in 1962.

== Career ==
In 1962, Lamberg began her career as assistant director of public relations at the Jewish Hospital of St. Louis (now Barnes-Jewish Hospital). In 1964 she became director of public relations at the Hospital of the University of Pennsylvania.

In the 1970s, Lamberg began to work as a freelance medical writer, focusing on the then-emerging science of sleep. During a nighttime observation at the University of Chicago sleep laboratory, she had an unexpected encounter with two alligators housed in a bathroom, subjects themselves of a sleep study. The experience heightened her interest in reporting on diverse aspects of the then-young science of sleep.

By 1986, she had already written more than 60 articles on sleep and dreams for general circulation magazines, according to The Baltimore Sun.

Lamberg continued to contribute articles to medical publications and popular magazines, according to WebMD: "Lynne Lamberg writes on psychiatry and sleep medicine for physicians in The Journal of the American Medical Association and Psychiatric News. She has written hundreds of articles, book reviews, and op-ed essays for Better Homes and Gardens, Self, Psychology Today, Brainwork, New Choices, Working Woman, Ladies' Home Journal, and other national circulation magazines, as well as for The Baltimore Sun, The Atlanta Constitution, Orlando Sentinel, San Diego Union-Tribune, and other newspapers." The Sleep Foundation said, "She is a regular contributor to JAMA (The Journal of the American Medical Association), and Psychiatric News, and reviews consumer books on sleep, biological rhythms and dreams."

== Critical responses ==
In the foreword to Bodyrhythms: Chronobiology and Peak Performance (William Morrow and Company, 1984), William C. Dement said, "...this is the most comprehensive text on sleep and wakefulness that has ever been written for the lay reader, and Lynne Lamberg, its author, is as much of a scientific expert as any nonscientist could be." A review in The Baltimore Sun quoted Lamberg's example explaining chronotherapy: "A drug like aspirin stays in the body for a very long time; it may not make any difference what time it's taken. Other drugs disappear within three or four hours, so the timing may be important." Elizabeth DeVita wrote in American Health that the book "...explores changing sleep patterns throughout the life cycle", concluding, "Eventually, says Lamberg, we may see a shift in school schedules, with high school students starting later and ending later in the day, and younger children starting earlier."

Montague Ullman, reviewing Crisis Dreaming, wrote that Lamberg, "...judging from her preface, has a natural affinity for dreams. The result is an excellent introduction to dreams and how to understand them. Written in a graceful, flowing style and set in a personal tone, there results a sense of intimacy between author and reader. This book is authoritative, informative, respectful of the dreamer and the dream, and it offers a structure within which dream work can be pursued."

John Langone, reviewing The Body Clock Guide in The New York Times in 2002, wrote, "Most of us can tell time, but few of us know how to tell body time, according to the authors of this book on (take your pick) chronobiology, chronomedicine, chronotherapy and chronorecord-keeping. 'We pay more attention to watches we wear on our wrists than to clocks we acquire in the womb,' they say. That diverted attention, they add, apparently prevents people from using the body's time machine, its natural rhythms, to fight illness and achieve maximum health. Sound too good to be true? Perhaps. But the science of body time is valid… All in all, it makes for informative reading, and it may well do some good."

== Selected publications ==
=== Books ===
- Smolensky, Michael; Lamberg, Lynne (2000). The Body Clock Guide to Better Health: How to Use Your Body's Natural Clock to Fight Illness and Achieve Maximum Health. New York: Henry Holt and Co. ASIN B00TDQ1TL6.
- Lamberg, Lynne (2000). Skin Disorders (21st Century Health and Wellness). New York: Chelsea House Publishing. ISBN 0791059839.
- Lamberg, Lynne (1994). Bodyrhythms: Chronobiology and Peak Performance. William Morrow & Co. ISBN 0877959919.
- Cartwright, Rosalind; Lamberg, Lynne (1992). Crisis Dreaming: Using Your Dreams to Solve Your Problems. New York: HarperCollins. ISBN 0060921870.
- Lamberg, Lynne (1988). Drugs and Sleep (Encyclopedia of Psychoactive Drugs, Series 2). New York: Chelsea House Publishers. ISBN 1555462138.
- Lamberg, Lynne (1984). The American Medical Association Guide to Better Sleep. New York: Random House Publishing Group. ISBN 0394721535.

=== Selected articles ===
- Lamberg, Lynne (November 9, 1975). "Sleep Research: Scientists Behind the Pillow". The Baltimore Sun. Baltimore, Maryland – via newspapers.com, pages 211, 216, 217, 219, 221.
- Lamberg, Lynne (1985). "Newly awakened interest in sleep research spans many specialties". JAMA. 254 (10): 1275–1284. doi:10.1001/jama.1985.03360100013001. PMID 4021000.
- Lamberg, Lynne (1985). "Causes of, therapies for insomnia, other sleep problems under study". JAMA. 254 (9): 1125–1126. doi:10.1001/jama.1985.03360090011001. PMID 4021048. "Sidebar". JAMA. doi:10.1001/jama.1985.03360090012002.
- Lamberg, Lynn. "Night Pilot". Psychology Today. 22 (7–8): 35–42.
- Lamberg, Lynne (December 5, 1994). "Teens aren't lying—they really need to sleep later" (PDF). American Medical News: 24–26.
- Lamberg, Lynne (September 18, 1996). "Some Schools Agree to Let Sleeping Teens Lie". JAMA. 276 (9): 859. doi:10.1001/jama.1996.03540110013007.
- Lamberg, Lynne (November 1997). "Preserving the Life of a Lab. Curt Richter, The Man Known As the 'Father of the Biological Clock,' Worked for Nearly 60 Years at Hopkins". Johns Hopkins Magazine: 34–35.
- Lamberg, Lynne (Spring 2004). "The Student, the Professor, and the Birth of Modern Sleep Research" (PDF). Medicine on the Midway. 57: 16–25.
- Lamberg, Lynne (2009). "High Schools Find Later Start Time Helps Students' Health and Performance". JAMA. 301 (21): 2200–2201. doi:10.1001/jama.2009.786. PMID 19491176.
- Lamberg, Lynne (October 17, 2014). "Why Can't Teenagers Go to Sleep Earlier?". Psychiatric News. 20 (24): 49. doi:10.1176/appi.pn.2014.10a27.
- Lamberg, Lynne (October 3, 2014). "School Starts Too Early for Teens, Pediatricians Agree". Psychiatric News. 49 (19): 22–27. doi:10.1176/appi.pn.2014.10a28.
- Lamberg, Lynne (November 3, 2017). "It's About Time! Three Researchers Win Nobel for Circadian Clock Discoveries. Sidebar: The Nightowl Gene". Psychiatric News. 52 (21): 14–15. doi:10.1176/appi.pn.2017.11a21.
- Lamberg, Lynne (January 3, 2020). "California Passes Nation's First Law on School Start Times". Psychiatric News. 55 (1): 6. doi:10.1176/appi.pn.2020.1a23. S2CID 213105521.
- Lamberg, Lynne (July 30, 2021). "Lack of Sleep Affecting Adolescent Learning? Coverage Tips for Early School Start Times Get background, story ideas and advice". Education Writers Association, Blog: The Educated Reporter.
- Lamberg, Lynne (July 25, 2024). "To Lower Suicide Risk, Treat Troubled Sleep". Psychiatric News. 59 (8). doi:10.1176/appi.pn.2024.08.8.27. ISSN 0033-2704.
- Carskadon, Mary; Lamberg, Lynne (March 9, 2024). "Give America's teens a break: Switch to permanent standard time". The Hill.
- Caskadon, Mary; Lambert, Lynne (September 9, 2023). "US Schools Flunk the Start Time Test" (PDF). The Messenger.

== Awards, honors ==
While she was still in college, her factual feature article, "It's All in a Day's Work", won first prize in the local 1962 National Society of Arts and Letters contest.

In 1986, she was awarded Class AAA first place of the American Academy of Family Physicians in Kansas City, Mo., for "Arthritis: An Encouraging Progress Report", published in Better Homes and Gardens.

Lamberg was presented the first Writer's Award of the Maryland Psychiatric Society Inc., in 1986, cited "for bringing information about mental health and mental illness to the public through the use of the media".

She received the 1999 National Alliance on Mental Illness Outstanding Media Award, for "What Are You Going to Do With a 41-Year-Old Man?"

In 2001, she won the Outstanding Book Award of the American Society of Journalists and Authors, for The Body Clock Guide to Better Health: How to Use Your Body's Natural Clock to Fight Illness and Achieve Maximum Health, co-authored with Michael Smolensky.

In 2005, she received the National Sleep Foundation Communications' Career Leadership Award for her skill in translating complex scientific concepts and reporting on diverse aspects of sleep medicine for a variety of audiences for more than three decades.

In 2006, she received the Society for Women's Health Research Excellence in Women's Health Research Journalism Award, for "Risks and Benefits Key to Psychotropic Use During Pregnancy and Postpartum Period". The citation said, "Lamberg chronicles the difficult choices mothers and their physicians face regarding the complex risks and benefits of taking psychotropic medications and the impact of that decision on mother and child from conception through breastfeeding."

In 2016, the National Association of Science Writers gave Lamberg its Diane McGurgan Service Award, for volunteer service as NASW's Book Editor for more than 16 years, producing resources that highlight members' work and provide support for authors.

Lamberg was the recipient of the Sleep Health Advocate Award of the American Academy of Sleep Medicine in June 2024.
