= Helen Kales =

Geriatric psychiatrist and researcher

Helen C. Kales is the Joe P. Tupin Professor at the University of California Davis. She is known for her work in geriatric psychiatry.

== Early life and education ==
Kales was born in 1965, and graduated from Hershey High School in 1983. She studied Spanish at Bucknell University and graduated in 1987. Hales earned an M.D. from the University of Rochester School of Medicine in 1992, did her residency and fellowship at the University of Michigan.

== Career ==
As of 2025 Kales is the Joe P. Tupin Professor and leads the department of Psychiatry and Behavioral Sciences.

== Work ==
Kale's work is centered on geriatric psychiatry. She focuses on later-life depression, especially the use and risks of psychotropic medications for older adults, and improving dementia care. Kales is also known for her work in providing resources for people helping others with dementia, and sharing tips on care with the public.

== Honors and awards ==
In 2021 the American College of Psychiatrists awarded Kales the Geriatric Psychiatry Award (2021) for her contributions to the field of mental health and aging.

== Selected publications ==
- Kales, Helen C.; Kim, Hyungjin Myra; Zivin, Kara; Valenstein, Marcia; Seyfried, Lisa S.; Chiang, Claire; Cunningham, Francesca; Schneider, Lon S.; Blow, Frederic C. (2012). "Risk of Mortality Among Individual Antipsychotics in Patients With Dementia". American Journal of Psychiatry. 169 (1): 71–79. doi:10.1176/appi.ajp.2011.11030347. ISSN 0002-953X. PMC 4269551. PMID 22193526.
- Kales, Helen C.; Gitlin, Laura N.; Lyketsos, Constantine G.; the Detroit Expert Panel on the Assessment and Management of the Neuropsychiatric Symptoms of Dementia (2014). "Management of Neuropsychiatric Symptoms of Dementia in Clinical Settings: Recommendations from a Multidisciplinary Expert Panel". Journal of the American Geriatrics Society. 62 (4): 762–769. doi:10.1111/jgs.12730. ISSN 0002-8614. PMC 4146407. PMID 24635665.
- Kales, H. C.; Gitlin, L. N.; Lyketsos, C. G. (2015-03-02). "Assessment and management of behavioral and psychological symptoms of dementia". BMJ. 350 (mar02 7): h369. doi:10.1136/bmj.h369. ISSN 1756-1833. PMC 4707529. PMID 25731881.
- Maust, Donovan T.; Kim, Hyungjin Myra; Seyfried, Lisa S.; Chiang, Claire; Kavanagh, Janet; Schneider, Lon S.; Kales, Helen C. (2015-05-01). "Antipsychotics, Other Psychotropics, and the Risk of Death in Patients With Dementia: Number Needed to Harm". JAMA Psychiatry. 72 (5): 438–445. doi:10.1001/jamapsychiatry.2014.3018. ISSN 2168-622X. PMC 4439579. PMID 25786075.
