= Victor Reus =

American psychiatrist

Victor I Reus
- Born: United States

Academic background
- Education: Cornell University; University of Maryland; University of Wisconsin

Academic work
- Institutions: University of California, San Francisco

Victor I Reus is an American psychiatrist, academic and an author. He is an Emeritus Distinguished Professor at University of California, San Francisco.

Reus' research spans several decades and has contributed towards the understanding of the interplay between biological, psychological, and genetic factors in mental health, particularly in depression and related mood disorders. He co-invented a genetic method to identify, diagnose, classify, and personalize treatment for bipolar disorder using DNA polymorphisms within a specific region on the short arm of chromosome 18. He also received the 2009 Seymour Vestermark Psychiatry Educator Award from American Psychiatric Association.

== Education ==
Reus earned his B.A. in Psychology from Cornell University in 1969, followed by a Doctor of Medicine degree from the University of Maryland in 1973. He completed his Psychiatry Residency at the University of Wisconsin in 1976 and a Fellowship in Biological Psychiatry at the National Institute of Mental Health.

== Career ==
Reus began his academic career in 1976 by joining the George Washington University School of Medicine as an Instructor, serving until 1978, while concurrently holding a similar appointment at Georgetown University's School of Medicine from 1977 to 1978. He then joined the University of California, San Francisco (UCSF), where he served as an Assistant Professor in the Department of Psychiatry from 1978 to 1983, an Associate Professor from 1983 to 1989, and a Professor from 1989 to 2017. Between 1995 and 1998, he served as a Senior Research Associate in the Alzheimer's and Memory Disorders Clinic at UCSF. In 2017, he became a Distinguished Professor in the Department of Psychiatry, a role he held until 2021. In 2021, he was named an Emeritus Distinguished Professor at UCSF.

== Research ==
Reus' work explores different aspects of psychiatric illnesses, focusing on their biological underpinnings and potential therapeutic interventions. In 1982 he published a study that demonstrated the etiological importance of a transdiagnostic dimensional approach to diagnosis over traditional categorical definitions, through usage of a biomarker, cortisol disinhibition, as an independent variable. Focusing on the cognitive effects of corticosteroids revealed impairments in verbal memory among depressed patients and individuals exposed to corticosteroid treatments, which suggested specific cognitive vulnerabilities associated with these hormones and highlighted the potential utility of anti-glucocorticoid agents in the treatment of depression.

In the mid-1990s, Reus contributed to the genetic mapping of bipolar disorder (BPD), identifying a susceptibility locus at 18q22-q23. This work emphasized the value of genetic studies in understanding severe mood disorders. His investigations into the neuropsychiatric effects of dehydroepiandrosterone (DHEA) during the late 1990s demonstrated its potential antidepressant and cognitive-enhancing effects, suggesting its promise as a treatment for depression, particularly among resistant cases. He also explored the role of serotonergic modulation in social behavior and personality traits. A 1998 study using a selective serotonin reuptake inhibitor (SSRI) demonstrated how serotonergic interventions could reduce negative affect and enhance affiliative behavior, even in non-depressed individuals.

In subsequent years, Reus explored the link between depressive symptoms and cognitive decline in older adults, finding that depressive symptoms were associated with poorer cognitive performance and increased risks of cognitive deterioration. His work with colleagues from 2011 revealed correlations between major depressive disorder (MDD), oxidative stress, inflammation, and shortened leukocyte telomeres, suggesting a mechanism of accelerated biological aging in depression. Furthermore, his contributions to research on shared heritability among brain disorders highlighted the genetic overlap between psychiatric illnesses while delineating distinctions from neurological conditions. In 2022, a study on childhood adversity detailed how different dimensions of adverse experiences, such as maltreatment and household dysfunction, impact biological aging in individuals with depression, suggesting distinct mechanisms influencing disease progression.

== Awards and honors ==
- 2009 – Seymour Vestermark Psychiatry Educator Award, American Psychiatric Association
- 2022 – Distinguished Service in Psychiatry Award, American College of Psychiatrists

== Bibliography ==
=== Books ===
- Psychopharmacology of Neurologic Disease (2019) ISBN 9780444640123

=== Selected articles ===
- Wolkowitz, O. M., Reus, V. I., Weingartner, H., Thompson, K., Breier, A., Doran, A., ... & Pickar, D. (1990). Cognitive effects of corticosteroids. The American Journal of Psychiatry, 147(10), 1297–1303.
- Knutson, B., Wolkowitz, O. M., Cole, S. W., Chan, T., Moore, E. A., Johnson, R. C., ... & Reus, V. I. (1998). Selective alteration of personality and social behavior by serotonergic intervention. American Journal of Psychiatry, 155(3), 373–379. *Yaffe, K., Blackwell, T., Gore, R., Sands, L., Reus, V., & Browner, W. S. (1999). Depressive symptoms and cognitive decline in nondemented elderly women: A prospective study. Archives of General Psychiatry, 56(5), 425–430.
- Wolkowitz, O. M., Reus, V. I., Keebler, A., Nelson, N., Friedland, M., Brizendine, L., & Roberts, E. (1999). Double-blind treatment of major depression with dehydroepiandrosterone. American Journal of Psychiatry, 156(4), 646–649.
- Maninger, N., Wolkowitz, O. M., Reus, V. I., Epel, E. S., & Mellon, S. H. (2009). Neurobiological and neuropsychiatric effects of dehydroepiandrosterone (DHEA) and DHEA sulfate (DHEAS). Frontiers in Neuroendocrinology, 30(1), 65–91.
