= Killing of Mark Lawrence =

2011 homicide–suicide in Virginia, U.S.

- Undated photo of Mark A. Lawrence
- Location: McLean, Virginia, United States
- Date: July 22, 2011; 15 years ago
- Attack type: Homicide–suicide by shooting
- Deaths: 2 (Lawrence and Newman)
- Victims: Mark Allen Lawrence, aged 71
- Perpetrator: Barbara Ann Newman
- Motive: Mental illness; Belief of imposed control

The killing of Mark Allen Lawrence (December 9, 1939 – July 22, 2011) occurred on July 22, 2011, at Lawrence's home in McLean, Virginia, where he worked as a semiretired psychiatrist. Lawrence's killer, 62-year-old Barbara Newman, was one of his long-time patients. Under severe symptoms from paranoid schizophrenia, Newman blamed Lawrence for her problems, pathologically believing that he controlled her life; she ultimately shot and killed Lawrence before committing suicide with a self-inflicted gunshot to the head.

The murder put focus on violence against mental health professionals and the boundaries of the medical confidentiality when a patient shows clear signs of deteriorating health problems, with Lawrence having confided to a friend a day earlier that Newman's paranoia concerned him.

== Background ==
=== Mark Lawrence ===
Mark Allen Lawrence grew up in Gary, Indiana, and graduated from Amherst College in Amherst, Massachusetts, in 1961. In 1969, he moved to Washington, D.C., and began working in 1974 as a group therapist in the area. Developing skills dealing with disturbed and complex patients, he funded the Center for Healing and Imagery (CHI) in McLean, Virginia, in 1984, where he remained as a professor until his death. By the time of his death in July 2011, Lawrence was semiretired, keeping only a handful of patients that he treated at his home in McLean. One of his colleagues at CHI, Cynthia Margolies, said that Lawrence was focused on mentoring young psychiatrists in the Fairfax County, Virginia area. He had previously taught at the Harvard Medical School, the Massachusetts Mental Health Center and Georgetown University School of Medicine, and was a staff member at St. Elizabeths Hospital. Susan Drobis, a clinic social worker who knew Lawrence for more than 25 years, said that he assisted in the careers of hundreds of professionals in Washington, D.C., and the Fairfax County area. She also added that some young professionals often referred to him to solve impasses with complex patients. Prior to entering private practice, Lawrence had developed a promising public career at the National Institute of Mental Health and at the administration of a mental health community center in Washington, D.C.

Lawrence worked briefly for the CIA in the 1990s, helping in the agency's psychological profiling of foreign leaders.

=== Barbara Newman ===
Barbara Ann Newman was a retired 62-year-old scientist. She grew up on Long Island and graduated from a local top public high school, later attending Smith College, where she earned a degree in psychology. Newman continued her scientific studies, obtaining a Ph.D. in immunology at Columbia University, where she began a postdoctorate in 1986. Her college friends described Newman as "deeply affected" following the sudden death of her father, and remembered her as focused on her career. Newman was a researcher at the National Institutes of Health and had ventured into social work, with her acquaintances saying that she sought to help people directly.

Newman moved to McLean in or around 1999, and met Lawrence a short time later, though records did not show when she became his patient. In April 2001, Newman lost her 56-year-old brother Stephen to a stroke, dealing with a difficult grieving despite having few connections to her family. Newman's mother, who lived in Florida, visited her often until her death in early 2007, as well as one of her sisters, but had no known connection in the Vienna area. Shortly after her mother's death, Newman retired "by personal choice", according to Betty Erickson, one of her neighbors in Vienna, Virginia. Erickson recalled Newman as a "very intelligent and normal" person, adding that she never showed signs of anger or any violent tendencies. She also confirmed that Newman had lived alone in Vienna for the previous 10 years and that she "kept to herself", though she socialized with the community and neighborhood families in local gatherings.

Neighbors reported that Newman liked to help others. Erickson said that she would hire her [Erickson's] daughter to mow the lawn and her son to do home chores, from replacing furniture to other general improvements of her house. Newman's former co-workers said that she did not like to talk about her medical condition and that she was extremely private on the issue.

By July 2011, Newman was suffering from severe paranoia, which included thoughts that psychiatrist Mark Lawrence was controlling and negatively affecting her life.

== Killing ==
Aware of Newman's growing paranoia and worsening psychotic thinking, Lawrence met the day before the killing with his colleague and friend Melvin Stern, who had worked with him in Washington in the 1970s. He confided to Stern his concerns about Newman, telling Stern that "[Newman] thinks I'm to blame for all her problems." Stern advised Lawrence to transfer her case to another doctor or to make an outside consultation; Lawrence agreed and promised that he would do that, but conveyed no fear in Newman nor thought that she was a danger to herself or to others.

At around 3:30 p.m. (EDT–4) on July 22, 2011, Newman spoke to a neighbor and asked him if he would help her change some failing smoke detectors at her home the following morning. She subsequently drove to McLean, where she had a scheduled appointment with Lawrence. Newman arrived at Lawrence's residence around 4:00 p.m., while Lawrence was finishing a previous session with another patient. He went downstairs and asked Newman to wait for him a few minutes; as he headed back up to his office, Newman took out a pistol and fired several shots at Lawrence, killing him. The Fairfax County Police Department (FCPD) received a 9-1-1 call at 4:15 p.m. reporting gunshots at a home on 8612 Tebbs Lane. When police arrived, officers found Lawrence's body inside the residence and found Barbara Newman on the outside porch, bleeding from an apparent self-inflicted gunshot to the head. Lucy Caldwell, a spokesperson for the FCPD, later confirmed that Newman was pronounced dead at the scene.

Lawrence's wife Karen, who had recently suffered from a stroke and remained in bed under home care, was in the house when the killing occurred.

== Aftermath ==
The killing of Mark Lawrence shocked the local medical community, with a clinical professor in Maryland using the case to draw attention to the risks faced by mental health professionals when treating complex cases. Lawrence's friend and colleague Melvin Stern said in an interview with The Washington Post that he was "warm, engaging, a good listener, and exceedingly creative." Another friend and colleague, Jerrold Post, highlighted Lawrence's ability to combine "warmth and compassion" with his profession.

The American Psychiatric Association (APA) released a statement expressing shock and sadness at Lawrence's death. APA Secretary Roger Peele said that Lawrence was a caring person who dared to work in fields that not many psychiatrists dare to enter, such as group and family therapies. The organization's website also republished an article by APA president John Oldham, who had written a week earlier for Psychiatric News and The New York Times, with the subject of his publication being the dangers that psychiatrists confront when dealing with severe cases of mental illness.

Lawrence's classmates from the Amherst College's Class of 1961 issued a statement condemning his killing and noting Lawrence's honor when treating his patients and how he wanted the best for each one of them, while Susan Lindsay, a religious minister in Reston, Virginia, who worked with him and some of his cases, voiced similar feelings for Lawrence, saying that he was an "advocate for his patients", helping in their paths to heal past traumas.

Lawrence's daughter, Katherine, said that her father had had issues with patients who did not respect boundaries, but said that he never feared or expressed concern about Newman, adding that he kept her file confidential. Lisa Boyd, a former co-worker and a friend of Newman, expressed shock at her actions, saying that Newman "valued life" and that she seemed to be getting better despite her mental struggles.

John Lion, a clinical professor in psychiatry at the University of Maryland School of Medicine, stated following Lawrence's killing that a mental health professional is murdered by a patient in the United States every two or three years, citing previous cases like the murder of Kathryn Faughey, a 56-year-old psychologist who was killed by a patient at her Upper East Side office in New York City in February 2008. Lion added that doctors often screen their patients when they see them in private settings. Studies related to violence suffered by mental health professionals at the hands of patients showed in July 2011 that in most cases, issues like substance abuse or a history of repetitive and recent criminal behavior were usual. Newman did not meet these criteria; she did not have a criminal record and her closest connections were unaware of any addiction problem.
