= Michael Smolensky =

American chronobiologist

Michael Hale Smolensky
- Born: 1942
- Education: PhD
- Occupation: Professor
- Employer: University of Texas
- Known for: Chronobiology

Michael Smolensky is an American chronobiologist working in hypertension and pathophysiology.

== Education and career ==
He earned his Ph.D at University of Illinois.

He founded and for 10 years directed the Memorial-Hermann Center for Chronobiology and Chronotherapeutics (the first polyclinic to use biological rhythm to diagnose and cure disease).

He is the author or co-author of more than 300 academic articles; his highest cited paper is "Ethics and methods for biological rhythm research on animals and human beings". at 739 times, according to Google Scholar. He also co-authored (alongside Lynne Lamberg) the book The Body Clock Guide to Better Health which is held in 449 libraries.

He recently was involved in works upon resilience and circadian reliability of fire departments with French firefighters.
