= Rosalind Cartwright =

American neuroscientist and sleep researcher (1922–2021)

Rosalind Dymond Cartwright
- Born: Rosalind Falk; December 30, 1922; New York City
- Died: January 15, 2021 (aged 98); Chicago
- Education: B.S., M.S., University of Toronto; Ph.D., Cornell University
- Scientific career
- Workplaces: Mt. Holyoke College University of Chicago Rush University
- Thesis: Empathic Ability, an Exploratory Study

Rosalind Dymond Cartwright (1922–2021) was a neuroscientist and professor emerita in the Department of Psychology and in the Neuroscience Division of the Graduate College of Rush University. She was known to her peers as "Queen of Dreams". In 2004 she was named Distinguished Scientist of the Year by the Sleep Research Society.

== Personal life and education ==
The daughter of Henry Falk, a real estate developer, and Stella (Hein) Falk, a poet, Rosalind (Falk) Dymond Cartwright was born in New York City on December 30, 1922.

Her undergraduate and master's degrees were from the University of Toronto. She earned her Ph.D. with the dissertation, Empathic Ability, an Exploratory Study, at Cornell University in 1949.

She was married four times, twice to the same man, Richard Dennis. Her other spouses were William Dymond and Desmond Cartwright.

Rosalind Cartwright died in Chicago on January 15, 2021, at the age of 98.

== Career ==
Penelope Green of The New York Times wrote, "Nicknamed the Queen of Dreams by her peers, Cartwright studied the role of dreaming in divorce-induced depression, worked with sleep apnea patients and their frustrated spouses, and helped open one of the first sleep disorder clinics."

Cartwright's early faculty career included two years at Mount Holyoke College and twelve years at the University of Chicago. She built a sleep lab in 1962 at the University of Illinois College of Medicine, and studied REM sleep and dreaming. In 1977 she joined the faculty of the Graduate College at Rush University Medical Center, as chair of the Department of Behavioral Sciences and later the Department of Psychology and the Neuroscience Division, and she founded the sleep disorder research and treatment center there.

She became professor emerita in 2008 after stepping down from her position as chair of the Department of Behavioral Sciences at Rush University Medical Center.

== Selected publications ==
=== Books ===
- Cartwright, Rosalind Dymond (1977). Night Life: Explorations in Dreaming. Prentice-Hall. ISBN 978-0136223245.
- Cartwright, Rosalind Dymond (1978). A Primer on Sleep and Dreaming (Series in Clinical and Professional Psychology). Addison-Wesley. ISBN 978-0201009415.
- Cartwright, Rosalind Dymond; Lamberg, Lynne (2001). Crisis Dreaming: Using Your Dreams to Solve Your Problems. iUnuverse. ISBN 978-0595155514.
- Cartwright, Rosalind D. (2010). The Twenty-Four Hour Mind: The Role of Sleep and Dreaming in Our Emotional Lives. Oxford University Press. ISBN 978-0199896288.
- Rogers, Carl; Dymond, Rosalind F. (1954). Psychotherapy and personality change. Chicago: University of Chicago Press. ISBN 9780226723747.

=== Selected articles ===
- Cartwright, Rosalind (March 1991). "Dreams that work: The relation of dream incorporation to adaptation to stressful events". Dreaming. 1: 3–9. doi:10.1037/h0094312.
- Ferguson, Kathleen A.; Cartwright, Rosalind; Rogers, Robert; Schmidt-Nowara, Wolfgang (February 1, 2006). "Oral Appliances for Snoring and Obstructive Sleep Apnea: A Review". Sleep. 29 (2): 244–262. doi:10.1093/sleep/29.2.244. ISSN 0161-8105. PMID 16494093.
- Cartwright, Rosalind Dymond (September 1, 1984). "Effect of Sleep Position on Sleep Apnea Severity". Sleep. 7 (2): 110–114. doi:10.1093/sleep/7.2.110. ISSN 0161-8105. PMID 6740055.
- Agargun, Mehmet Y.; Cartwright, Rosalind (July 15, 2003). "REM sleep, dream variables and suicidality in depressed patients". Psychiatry Research. 119 (1): 33–39. doi:10.1016/S0165-1781(03)00111-2. ISSN 0165-1781. PMID 12860358. S2CID 38561971.
- Cartwright, Rosalind; Luten, Alice; Young, Michael; Mercer, Patricia; Bears, Michael (October 19, 1998). "Role of REM sleep and dream affect in overnight mood regulation: a study of normal volunteers". Psychiatry Research. 81 (1): 1–8. doi:10.1016/S0165-1781(98)00089-4. ISSN 0165-1781. PMID 9829645. S2CID 40978342.
- Cartwright, Rosalind; Agargun, Mehmet Y.; Kirkby, Jennifer; Friedman, Julie Kabat (March 30, 2006). "Relation of dreams to waking concerns". Psychiatry Research. 141 (3): 261–270. doi:10.1016/j.psychres.2005.05.013. ISSN 0165-1781. PMID 16497389. S2CID 23288469.
- Cartwright, Rosalind D.; Diaz, Frank; Lloyd, Stephen (July 1, 1991). "The Effects of Sleep Posture and Sleep Stage on Apnea Frequency". Sleep. 14 (4): 351–353. doi:10.1093/sleep/14.4.351. ISSN 0161-8105. PMID 1947599.
- Cartwright, Rosalind D.; Lloyd, Stephen; Knight, Sara; Trenholme, Irene (1984). "Broken Dreams: A Study of the Effects of Divorce and Depression on Dream Content". Psychiatry. 47 (3): 251–259. doi:10.1080/00332747.1984.11024246. ISSN 0033-2747. PMID 6473573.
- Cartwright, Rosalind; Young, Michael A; Mercer, Patricia; Bears, Michael (September 21, 1998). "Role of REM sleep and dream variables in the prediction of remission from depression". Psychiatry Research. 80 (3): 249–255. doi:10.1016/S0165-1781(98)00071-7. ISSN 0165-1781. PMID 9796940. S2CID 39431771.
- Cartwright, Rosalind D.; Wood, Ellen (December 1, 1991). "Adjustment disorders of sleep: The sleep effects of a major stressful event and its resolution". Psychiatry Research. 39 (3): 199–209. doi:10.1016/0165-1781(91)90088-7. ISSN 0165-1781. PMID 1798820. S2CID 24611110.
- Cartwright, Rosalind Dymond; Bernick, Niles; Borowitz, Gene; Kling, Arthur (March 1, 1969). "Effect of an Erotic Movie on the Sleep and Dreams of Young Men". Archives of General Psychiatry. 20 (3): 262–271. doi:10.1001/archpsyc.1969.01740150006002. ISSN 0003-990X. PMID 4303613.
- Cartwright, Rosalind (July 1, 2004). "Sleepwalking Violence: A Sleep Disorder, a Legal Dilemma, and a Psychological Challenge". American Journal of Psychiatry. 161 (7): 1149–1158. doi:10.1176/appi.ajp.161.7.1149. ISSN 0002-953X. PMID 15229043.
- Cartwright, Rosalind; Baehr, Erin; Kirkby, Jennifer; Pandi-Perumal, S. R.; Kabat, Julie (December 1, 2003). "REM sleep reduction, mood regulation and remission in untreated depression". Psychiatry Research. 121 (2): 159–167. doi:10.1016/S0165-1781(03)00236-1. ISSN 0165-1781. PMID 14656450. S2CID 23538454.
- Cartwright, Rosalind (1986). "Affect and Dream Work from an Information Processing Point of View". The Journal of Mind and Behavior. 7 (2/3): 411–427. ISSN 0271-0137. JSTOR 43853225.

== Awards and honors ==
- 1988: Eminent Woman in Psychology, 90th Annual APA Convention
- 1993: Award for Distinguished Contributions to Basic Research in Psychology, American Association of Applied and Preventive Psychology
- 2004: Distinguished Scientist Award, Sleep Research Society, an award for "significant, original, and sustained scientific contributions to the sleep and circadian research field... influential research spanning an entire career".

== See also ==
- Sleep disorder
- Dream
