= Robert F. Krueger =

American psychologist

- Education: University of Wisconsin-Madison
- Known for: Psychopathology
- Awards: 1996 Tanaka Award from the Association for Research in Personality, 2005 Distinguished Scientific Award for an Early Career Contribution to Psychology from the American Psychological Association
- Scientific career
- Fields: Psychology
- Workplaces: University of Minnesota
- Thesis: Personality Traits and Mental Disorders: Studies of Structures and Their Inter-relations Across Nations, Genders, Races, Assessment Instruments, Time Periods, and Reporters (1996)
- Doctoral advisor: Terrie Moffitt

Robert Frank Krueger is Hathaway Distinguished Professor of Clinical Psychology and Distinguished McKnight University Professor in the Department of Psychology at the University of Minnesota. He is known for his research on personality psychology, clinical psychology, quantitative psychology, developmental psychology, personality disorders, behavioral genetics, and psychopathology. He is the co-editor-in-chief of the Journal of Personality Disorders.

According to Krueger, the goal of his work is to "reduce the burden these problems place on society by working to understand why some people experience psychopathology, while others remain resilient."

Krueger received the American Psychological Association's Award for Distinguished Scientific Early Career Contributions to Psychology in 2005. Krueger was part of the DSM-5 Personality and Personality Disorders Work Group, which developed the Alternative DSM-5 Model for Personality Disorders. He is also one of the highest cited researchers according to the Web of Science.

Robert attended the University of Wisconsin-Madison and completed his clinical internship at Brown University.

== Publications ==
- Krueger, R.F. (1999). The structure of common mental disorders. Archives of General Psychiatry, 56, 921-926.
- Krueger, R. F., Hicks, B. M., Patrick, C. J., Carlson, S. R., Iacono, W. G., & McGue, M. (2002). Etiologic connections among substance dependence, antisocial behavior, and personality: Modeling the externalizing spectrum. Journal of Abnormal Psychology, 111, 411-424.
- Krueger, R. F., & Markon, K. E. (2006). Reinterpreting comorbidity: A model-based approach to understanding and classifying psychopathology. Annual Review of Clinical Psychology, 2, 111-133.
- Krueger, R. F., Markon, K. E., Patrick, C. J., Benning, S. D., & Kramer, M. (2007). Linking antisocial behavior, substance use, and personality: An integrative quantitative model of the adult externalizing spectrum. Journal of Abnormal Psychology, 116, 645-666.
- Krueger, R. F., & Eaton, N. (2010). Personality traits and the classification of mental disorders: Toward a more complete integration in DSM 5 and an empirical model of psychopathology. Personality Disorders: Theory, Research, and Treatment, 1, 97-118.
- Krueger, R. F., Eaton, N. R., Clark, L. A., Watson, D., Markon, K. E., Derringer, J., Skodol, A., & Livesley, W. J. (2011). Deriving an empirical structure of personality pathology for DSM-5. Journal of Personality Disorders, 25, 170-191.
- Krueger, R. F., Derringer, J., Irons, D. E., & Iacono, W. G. (2010). Harsh discipline, childhood sexual assault, and MAOA genotype: An investigation of main and interactive effects on diverse clinical externalizing outcomes. Behavior Genetics, 40, 639-648.
- Krueger, R. F., Eaton, N. R., Keyes, K. M., Balsis, S., Skodol, A. E., Markon, K. W., Grant, B. F., & Hasin, D. S. (2012). An invariant dimensional liability model of gender differences in mental disorder prevalence: Evidence from a national sample. Journal of Abnormal Psychology, 121, 282-288.
- Krueger, R.F., A.G., Hobbs, M.J., Markon, K.E., Eaton, N.R., & Slade, T. (in press). The structure of psychopathology: toward an expanded quantitative empirical model. Journal of Abnormal Psychology.
- Krueger, R.F., Derringer, J., Markon, K.E., Watson, D. (2012). Initial construction of a maladaptive personality trait model and inventory for DSM-5. Psychological Medicine.
- Krueger, R.F., Fowles, D.C., Patrick, C.J, (2009). Triarchic conceptualization of psychopathy: developmental origins of disinhibition, boldness, and meanness. Development and Psychopathology.
- Krueger, R.F., Watson, D., Markon, K.E. (2005). Delineating the Structure of Normal and Abnormal Personality: An Integrative Hierarchical Approach. Journal of Personality and Social Psychology.
- Krueger, R.F., Achenbach., T.M., Watson, D., Kotov, R. (2017). The Hierarchical Taxonomy of Psychopathology (HiTOP): A Dimensional Alternative to Traditional Nosologies. Journal of Abnormal Psychology.
- Krueger, R.F., Fraley, C., Robins, R.W. (2007). Handbook of research methods in personality psychology.
- Krueger, R.F., Benning, S.D., Patrick, C.J., Hicks, B.M., Blonigen, D.M. (2003) Factor structure of the psychopathic personality inventory: validity and implications for clinical assessment. Psychological Assessment.
