= Murder of Kathryn Faughey =

2008 murder in New York City, United States

Kathryn Faughey was a 56-year-old New York City psychologist who was murdered by 39-year-old David Tarloff at her Upper East Side office on the night of February 12, 2008.

== Background ==
David Tarloff had exhibited disturbing behaviours for almost two decades, and was well known to the medical and psychiatric establishment and the police force. During these years, up to the time of the Kathryn Faughey murder, he received a wide range of psychiatric assessments and treatments. He received medication and electroshock therapy by force.

== Incident ==
Tarloff walked past the doorman, rolling a suitcase behind him (as seen on the building's surveillance video), saying that he was there to see Kent Schinbach, a psychiatrist from the same practice. Tarloff waited in the office reception area, chatting with a patient, while one of Faughey's evening sessions was in progress. After that session concluded, when he knew that Faughey was alone in her office, he entered the room and attacked her with a meat cleaver. Schinbach attempted to help her, but was seriously wounded by slashes in the face and neck.

== Aftermath ==
Tarloff was arrested and arraigned for the murder and ordered to undergo a psychiatric evaluation which found him to be mentally competent to stand trial. There was evidence that the attack had been premeditated, but that the intended victim was Schinbach. Tarloff told police that he had planned to rob Schinbach, who he remembered being involved in diagnosing him with schizophrenia in 1991 and arranging for his institutionalization at that time. Health Insurance Portability and Accountability Act (HIPAA) regulations to protect patient confidentiality were reported to have delayed the initial investigation. Tarloff, who was expected to plead insanity in the case, was confined to a psychiatric unit of Bellevue Hospital while awaiting trial. His attorney said that "the evidence is clear that he [Tarloff] did it, but the reasons he did it ... are so crazy that we believe we have a very strong insanity defense." His trial was scheduled for October 2010, but during jury selection a mistrial was declared after two psychiatrists that the court had appointed to evaluate Tarloff found him mentally unfit to stand trial.

Tarloff went on trial for the murder in March 2013 in the State Supreme Court in Manhattan. Jury selection was completed on March 8, 2013, and opening arguments were heard on March 11. Tarloff admitted to committing the murder, but sought to avoid a prison sentence on the grounds of his mental illness. On April 16, 2013, a mistrial was declared after the jury came back a third and final time with a note that they were deadlocked.

After the mistrials in 2010 and 2013, a third trial was held in March 2014. On March 28, Tarloff was found guilty of first-degree murder in his attack on Kathryn Faughey, as well as assault and robbery in regards to Schinbach, after seven hours of jury deliberations. Several members of Faughey's family were present throughout the trial, and after the verdicts were announced, her brother expressed relief that "the ordeal [was] over" and that justice had been served for Faughey. On May 2, 2014 Tarloff was brought before the State Supreme Court in Manhattan for sentencing. Prior to the sentencing, he apologized to Faughey's family and asked the judge for mercy, describing how he had suffered from hallucinations for two decades. The Supreme Court justice sentenced David Tarloff to the maximum possible sentence, life without the possibility of parole, for the first-degree murder of Faughey.

== Broader implications ==
The incident led to public discussion regarding the safety of mental health professionals who see patients in isolated settings. In 2006 psychiatrist Wayne Fenton, a schizophrenia researcher who was an administrator at the National Institute of Mental Health, was found dead in the home office in Bethesda, Maryland where he met with private patients, apparently murdered by a 19-year-old patient.

== See also ==
- Murder of Mark Lawrence – similar case in McLean, Virginia. Lawrence was shot and killed by a patient on July 22, 2011. The patient then killed herself.
