= Marvin Goldfried =

American psychologist

Marvin R. Goldfried (born 1936) is an American psychologist and retired distinguished professor of clinical psychology at Stony Brook University. His area of interest include psychotherapy integration and LGBT issues.

== Early life ==
Marvin Goldfried was born in 1936 in Brooklyn to parents who emigrated from Eastern Europe. Goldfried was the first in his family to pursue education beyond a high school diploma. He attended Brooklyn College where he earned a bachelor's degree in psychology, graduating in 1957. While attending college, he was a member of the Alpha Phi Omega fraternity through, which he participated in service to the college. He went on to earn a doctoral degree in Clinical Psychology at University at Buffalo in 1961, where he was first exposed to the writings of foundational minds in the field such as Freud, Rogers, and Skinner. He recalled feeling inspired by John F. Kennedy's inaugural address, which encouraged every American to try and make a difference. He also recalled noticing that there was sparse empirical background for his clinical training and meagre clinical experience in the departmental research faculty. This observation reflected the "gap" between science and practice. During his graduate studies, he completed a summer internship at the VA Palo Alto Hospital. While there he witnessed the development of both behavior therapy and family therapy.

== Career ==
Faculty Positions

After graduating with his PhD at the age of 25 in 1961, Goldfried joined the faculty at University of Rochester. He taught a graduate seminar and recalled being younger than all the students in the class. While at Rochester, he found little focus on behavioral research in the department. He later left the institution, and joined the psychology department at Stony Brook University in 1964 to work on developing a graduate program in clinical psychology. He became director of the training clinic, during which time the idea of supervision as part of the faculty teaching load was instituted in the department. This had not been a standard part of clinical psychology doctoral programs. Goldfried then focused his contributions to the rapidly developing clinical discipline of behavior therapy, with particular focus on providing the patient with coping skills.

Research on CBT

In 1968, Goldfried and his colleagues organized an American Psychological Association symposium dedicated to the exploration of cognition into behavior therapy. Drawing insight from foundational influences like Albert Ellis, Albert Bandura, and others, Goldfried researched interventions that would eventually be described as cognitive behavioral therapy. He published Clinical Behavior Therapy in 1976 with his colleague Gerald Davison, which included a chapter on integrating cognitive interventions in behavior therapy, a groundbreaking idea at the time. Goldfried has made a point in his writings that there was no "father of cognitive-behavior therapy" as it was very much a "family affair."

Goldfried would go on to contribute to the literature on psychotherapy outcome research by facilitating clinical trials of the CBT model. Among the most common applications for this treatment were various forms of anxiety. He also collaborated with Marsha M. Linehan when she worked as a postdoctoral fellow at Stony Brook. During this period of his career, Goldfried became more interested in psychotherapy integration, and co-founded the Society for the Exploration of Psychotherapy Integration (SEPI) together with Paul Wachtel in the early-1980s. In the mid-1990s, he served as the founding editor of In Session: Psychotherapy in Practice, which prioritized writing in "jargon-free" language in order to maximize resonance with any and all theoretical orientations.

Leadership in Organizations

In 2010, Goldfried became president of the Society of Clinical Psychology, Division 12 of APA, and began an initiative to build a Two-Way Bridge between Research and Practice. This initiative provided a way for practicing clinicians to provide feedback to researchers about their use of empirically supported treatments. The Two-Way Bridge initiative has surveyed therapists on their clinical experiences in treating clients with panic disorder, social anxiety, generalized anxiety disorder, and post-traumatic stress.

LGBT Research and Advocacy

Goldfried's interest in LGBT issues have strong roots in his time living and working during the 1970s, when gender roles were undergoing societal transformation. He considers himself a feminist and has participated in men's consciousness-raising groups. He once consulted with Gloria Steinem about consciousness raising groups after running into her on a flight. Goldfried's interest and advocacy was also inspired by his relationship with his gay son, Mike. As a strong proponent of the power of familial support for members of sexual minorities, he founded AFFIRM: Psychologists Affirming their LGBT Family, a network of family members in psychology with LGBT relatives that encourages research, clinical work, education, and advocacy.

Goldfried has served as president of multiple scientific associations such as the Society for Psychotherapy Research (SPR), American Psychological Association (APA) Division 12 (Society of Clinical Psychology) and Division 29 (Society for the Advancement of Psychotherapy).

Since retiring from Stony Brook, he spends time giving occasional talks, reviewing manuscripts, and recording episodes of his podcast Talking Therapy with colleague Allen Frances.

== Select awards and honors ==
Goldfried has received numerous awards from APA for his contributions to research, clinical psychology, and mentorship, such as the 1998 Division 12 Award for Distinguished Scientific Contributions to Clinical Psychology; 2000 Division 29 Award for Distinguished Psychologist; 2001 APA Award for Distinguished Contributions to Knowledge, 2002 Division 1 Staats Award for Contributions Toward Unifying Psychology; 2005 Division 29 Rosalee Weiss Award for Outstanding Leaders in Psychology; and the 2005 SPR Distinguished Career Award. Reflecting his work on LGBT issues in psychotherapy, he was awarded the 2004 Division 44 (Society for the Psychology of Sexual Orientation and Gender Diversity) Award for Distinguished Professional Contributions, the 2009 Division 44 Evelyn Hooker Award for Distinguished Contribution by an Ally, and the 2015 Committee on Sexual Orientation and Gender Diversity Outstanding Achievement Award. In 2018 he was awarded with the Gold Medal Award for Life Achievement in the Application of Psychology.

Goldfried has also been recognized by multiple other institutions for his impact on mentorship and supervision of graduate students. In 2006, he received the Outstanding Contribution by an Individual for Education/Training Activities Award from the Association for Behavioral and Cognitive Therapies. In 2008, Stony Brook awarded him the Dean's Award for Excellence in Graduate Mentoring. In 2009, he was the recipient of the APA Division 29 Award for Distinguished Contributions to Teaching and Mentoring.

For his work on research, the Society for the Exploration of Psychotherapy Integration (SEPI) renamed the New Researcher Award to the Marvin R. Goldfried New Researcher Award in 2015. In line with his work on cognitive behavior therapy and psychotherapy integration, he received the 2003 Association for Advancement of Behavior Therapy Award for Outstanding Clinical Contributions. In 2024, he received the Lifetime Achievement Award from Philadelphia Behavior Therapy Association.

== Selected publications ==
=== On his professional career ===
Goldfried M. R. (2024). Life Is About Change: A Professional Memoir. Annual Review of Clinical Psychology, 10.1146/annurev-clinpsy-081122-021157. Advance online publication. https://doi.org/10.1146/annurev-clinpsy-081122-021157

Goldfried M. R. (2015). A Professional Journey Through Life. In Session: Journal of Clinical Psychology, 71(11), 1083–1092. https://doi.org/10.1002/jclp.22218

=== On projective techniques ===
Goldfried, M.R., Stricker, G., & Weiner, I. B. (1971). Rorschach handbook of clinical and research applications. Englewood Cliffs, N.J. Prentice-Hall.

=== On cognitive behavioral therapy ===
D'Zurilla, T. J., & Goldfried, M. R. (1971). Problem solving and behavior modification. Journal of Abnormal Psychology, 78(1), 107–126. https://doi.org/10.1037/h0031360

Goldfried, M.R., & Davison, G.C. (1976). Clinical behavior therapy. New York: Holt, Rinehart & Winston. (Translated into German and Spanish; selected as Citation Classic)

=== On psychotherapy integration ===
Goldfried, M. R. (1980). Toward the delineation of therapeutic change principles. American Psychologist, 35(11), 991–999. https://doi.org/10.1037/0003-066X.35.11.991

Norcross, J.C., & Goldfried, M.R. (Eds.) (1992). Handbook of psychotherapy integration. New York: Basic Books (Translated into French)

Norcross, J. C., & Goldfried (Eds.). (2005). Handbook of psychotherapy integration (2nd ed.) New York: Oxford University Press.

Norcross, J. C., & Goldfried (Eds.). (2019). Handbook of psychotherapy integration (3nd ed.). New York: Oxford University Press.

=== On research-practice integration ===
Goldfried, M. R., Newman, M. G., Castonguay, L. G., Fuertes, J. N., Magnavita, J. J., Sobell, L. C., & Wolf, A. W. (2015). Closing the gap between research and practice: The two-way bridge initiative. Psychotherapy Bulletin, 50(4), 5–7.

Gaines, A. N., & Goldfried, M. R. (2021). Consensus in psychotherapy: Are we there yet? Clinical Psychology: Science and Practice, 28(3), 267–276. https://doi.org/10.1037/cps0000026

=== On integrating sexual minority issues into mainstream psychology ===
Goldfried M. R. (2001). Integrating gay, lesbian, and bisexual issues into mainstream psychology. The American Psychologist, 56(11), 977–988.

Pachankis, J. E., & Goldfried, M. R. (2004). Clinical issues in working with gay, lesbian, and bisexual clients. Psychotherapy: Theory, Research, Practice and Training, 41, 227–246.

== Personal life ==
He is married to Anita Goldfried. They have two children.
