= International Society for the Study of Personality Disorders =

International learned society

The International Society for the Study of Personality Disorders (abbreviated ISSPD) is an international learned society dedicated to promoting research on personality disorders. It was established in 1988 at the 1st International Congress on the Study of Personality Disorders. This event, held in Copenhagen, Denmark, also served as the ISSPD's first international conference. Theodore Millon, who played a key role in founding the ISSPD, served as its first president, and Erik Simonsen was its first general secretary and treasurer. Since 1989, its official journal has been the Journal of Personality Disorders, which is published on its behalf by Guilford Press.
