= Attenuated psychosis syndrome =

Proposed mental disorder diagnosis

Attenuated psychosis syndrome (APS) is a proposed mental disorder diagnosis characterized by presence of symptoms of psychosis without passing the threshold for a psychotic disorder. In APS, reality testing is "relatively intact", and the severity of symptoms is lower than in psychotic disorders.

The proposed diagnosis was included in Section III (Emerging measures and models) in the Diagnostic and Statistical Manual of Mental Disorders, Fifth Edition (DSM-5), in the chapter titled "Conditions for Further Study". Conditions outlined here are, according to the DSM-5, "not intended for clinical use; only the criteria sets and disorders in Section II of DSM-5 are officially recognized and can be used for clinical purposes". In addition to this, APS is mentioned as an example of a presentation which can be diagnosed as Other Specified Schizophrenia Spectrum and Other Psychotic Disorder, which is an official Section II diagnosis.
