= Journal of Psychiatric Practice =

Academic journal

- Discipline: Psychiatry
- Language: English
- Edited by: John M. Oldham

Publication details
- Former name(s): Journal of Practical Psychiatry and Behavioral Health
- History: 1995-present
- Publisher: Lippincott Williams & Wilkins
- Frequency: Bimonthly
- Impact factor: 1.722 (2017)

Standard abbreviations
- ISO 4: J. Psychiatr. Pract.

Indexing
- ISSN: 1527-4160 (print); 1538-1145 (web)
- LCCN: sn99009498
- OCLC no.: 42767652

Links
- Journal homepage; Online access; Online archive

The Journal of Psychiatric Practice is a bimonthly peer-reviewed medical review journal covering psychiatry. It was established in 1995 as the Journal of Practical Psychiatry and Behavioral Health, obtaining its current name in 2000. It is published by Lippincott Williams & Wilkins and the editor-in-chief is John M. Oldham (Baylor College of Medicine). According to the Journal Citation Reports, the journal has a 2017 impact factor of 1.722.
