= Journal of Personality Disorders =

- Discipline: Personality psychology
- Language: English
- Edited by: Robert F. Krueger, John M. Oldham

Publication details
- History: 1986-present
- Publisher: Guilford Press
- Frequency: Bimonthly
- Impact factor: 3.158 (2016)

Standard abbreviations
- ISO 4: J. Pers. Disord.

Indexing
- ISSN: 0885-579X (print); 1943-2763 (web)
- LCCN: 87640788
- OCLC no.: 925168151

Links
- Journal homepage; Online access; Online archive

Journal of Personality Disorders is a bimonthly peer-reviewed psychology journal covering the study of personality disorders. It was established in 1986 and is published by Guilford Press on behalf of the International Society for the Study of Personality Disorders, of which it is the official journal. The editors-in-chief are Robert F. Krueger (University of Minnesota) and John M. Oldham (Baylor College of Medicine). According to the Journal Citation Reports, the journal has a 2016 impact factor of 3.158.
