= Psychiatric News =

Mental health publication

- Editor-in-chief: Adrian Preda
- Former editors: Jeffrey Borenstein
- Categories: Psychiatry
- Frequency: Monthly
- Publisher: American Psychiatric Association
- Founded: 1965
- Language: English
- ISSN: 0033-2704 (print); 1559-1255 (web)
- OCLC: 644499095

Psychiatric News is the official newspaper of the American Psychiatric Association (APA).

== Description ==
Published in print monthly and online daily, Psychiatric News covers clinical and research news, mental health issues that focus on news affecting psychiatry and quality care for patients, and APA's programs.

Psychiatric News "is intended to provide the primary and most trusted information for APA members, other physicians and health professionals, and the public about developments in the field of psychiatry that impact clinical care and professional practice."

The New York Times has cited Psychiatric News variously as "the trade paper", "the journal of the American Psychiatric Association", "the newsletter of the American Psychiatric Association", "published by the American Psychiatric Association", and "meant for professional readers".

== History ==
The pilot issue was published in September 1965 with Robert L. Robinson as editor-in-chief. The newspaper was published monthly through 1969, twice monthly from 1970 through November 2020, and has been appearing monthly again since December 2020.

In December 2023, the APA named Adrian Preda as editor-in-chief of Psychiatric News.
