= American College of Psychiatrists =

Association of psychiatrists in Chicago

The American College of Psychiatrists is an American association of psychiatrists based in Chicago, Illinois. It operates annual meetings, publishes a newsletter, presents awards and organizes the PRITE exam for psychiatric residents and the PIPE exam for practicing psychiatrists. Membership is decided by current members. It was founded in 1963.
