= Borderline personality disorder =

Personality disorder

- Other names: Emotionally unstable personality disorder (EUPD, in ICD-10); Emotional intensity disorder; Hysteria (formerly); Hysteric personality – Hysteroid (formerly)
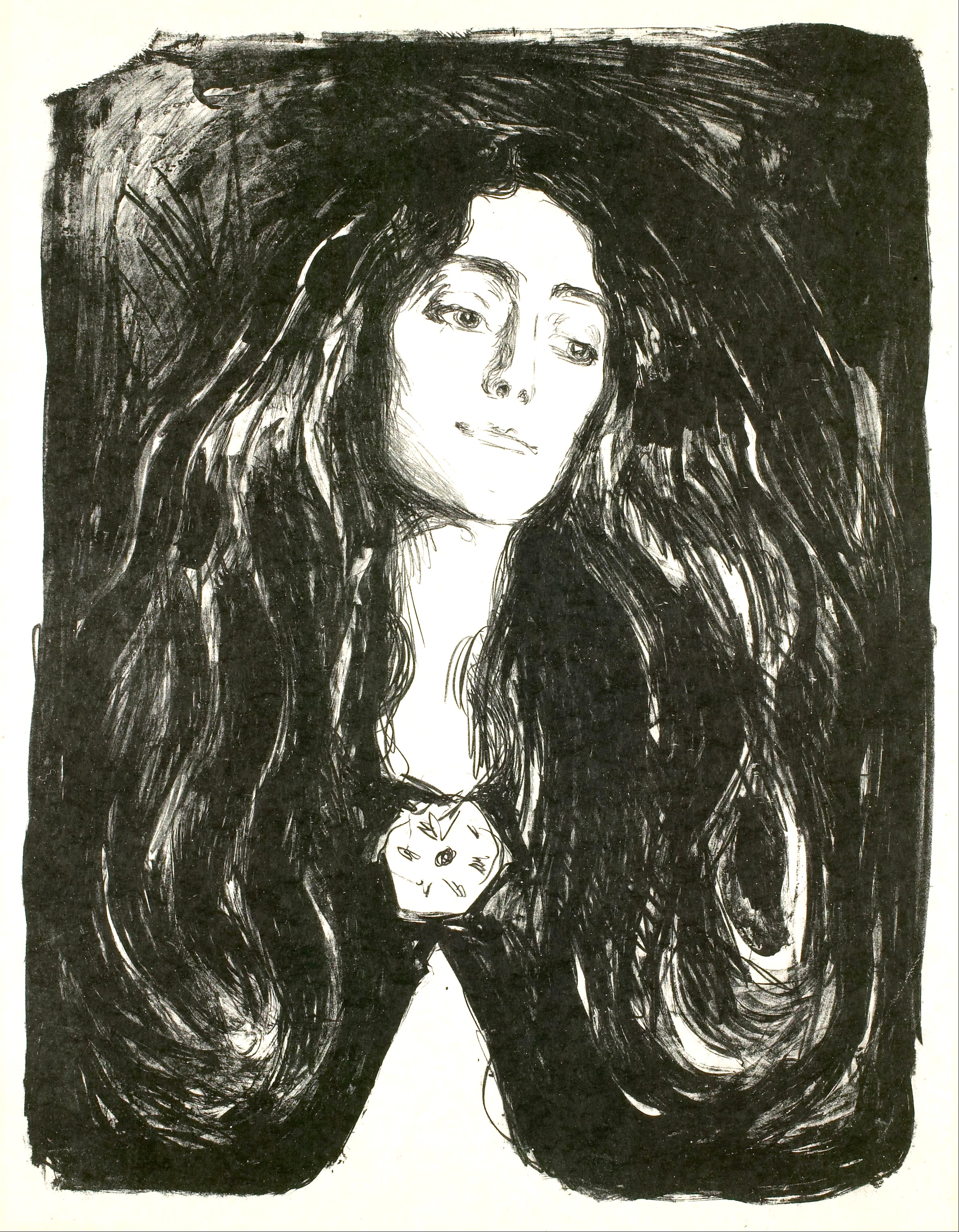
- The Brooch by Edvard Munch (1903), who is suggested to have had borderline personality disorder
- Specialty: Psychiatry, clinical psychology
- Symptoms: Unstable relationships, distorted sense of self, and intense emotions; impulsivity; recurrent suicidal and self-harming behavior; intense fear of abandonment; chronic feelings of emptiness; inappropriate anger; dissociation
- Complications: Suicide, self-harm
- Usual onset: Early adulthood
- Duration: Long term
- Causes: Genetic, neurobiologic, and psychosocial theories proposed
- Diagnostic method: Based on reported symptoms
- Differential diagnosis: See § Differential diagnosis
- Treatment: Behavior therapy
- Prognosis: Improves over time, remission occurs in 45% of patients over a wide range of follow-up periods
- Frequency: Median prevalence 1.6%

Borderline personality disorder (BPD) is a personality disorder characterized by a pervasive, long-term pattern across several contexts of significant interpersonal relationship instability, extreme fear of abandonment, and intense emotional outbursts. People with BPD frequently exhibit self-harming behaviors and engage in risky activities, primarily caused by difficulties in regulating emotions. Symptoms such as dissociation, a pervasive sense of emptiness, and distorted sense of self are prevalent.

Onset of symptoms can be triggered by events others perceive as normal, with the disorder typically manifesting in early adulthood and persisting across diverse contexts. BPD is often comorbid with substance use disorders, depressive disorders, and eating disorders. Studies estimate up to 10 percent of people with BPD die by suicide, a rate approximately 730 times greater than the general population in the United States. BPD faces significant stigmatization in media portrayals and the psychiatric field, leading to underdiagnosis and insufficient treatment.

Causes of BPD are unclear and complex, implicating genetic, neurological, and psychosocial conditions in its development. The current hypothesis suggests BPD is caused by an interaction between genetic factors and adverse childhood experiences. BPD is significantly more common in people with a family history of BPD, particularly immediate relatives, suggesting genetic predisposition. There is a risk of misdiagnosis, with BPD commonly confused with a mood disorder, substance use disorder, or other mental health disorders.

Therapeutic interventions predominantly involve psychotherapy, with dialectical behavior therapy (DBT) and schema therapy being the most effective. Although pharmacotherapy cannot cure BPD, it may be employed to mitigate symptoms, with atypical antipsychotics and selective serotonin reuptake inhibitor (SSRI) antidepressants commonly prescribed. Medications are used cautiously and may have minimal impact on neural function. Due to the high utilization of healthcare resources by people with BPD, up to half may show significant improvement over ten years with appropriate treatment.

Estimation of BPD's prevalence varies. In the US, around 1% of the population are diagnosed with it. BPD is more prevalent among adolescents and young adults than elderly, and symptoms may remit with age. The term 'borderline' is debated, as it referred to concepts of borderline insanity and patients on the border between neurosis and psychosis, which are now considered clinically imprecise.

== Signs and symptoms ==
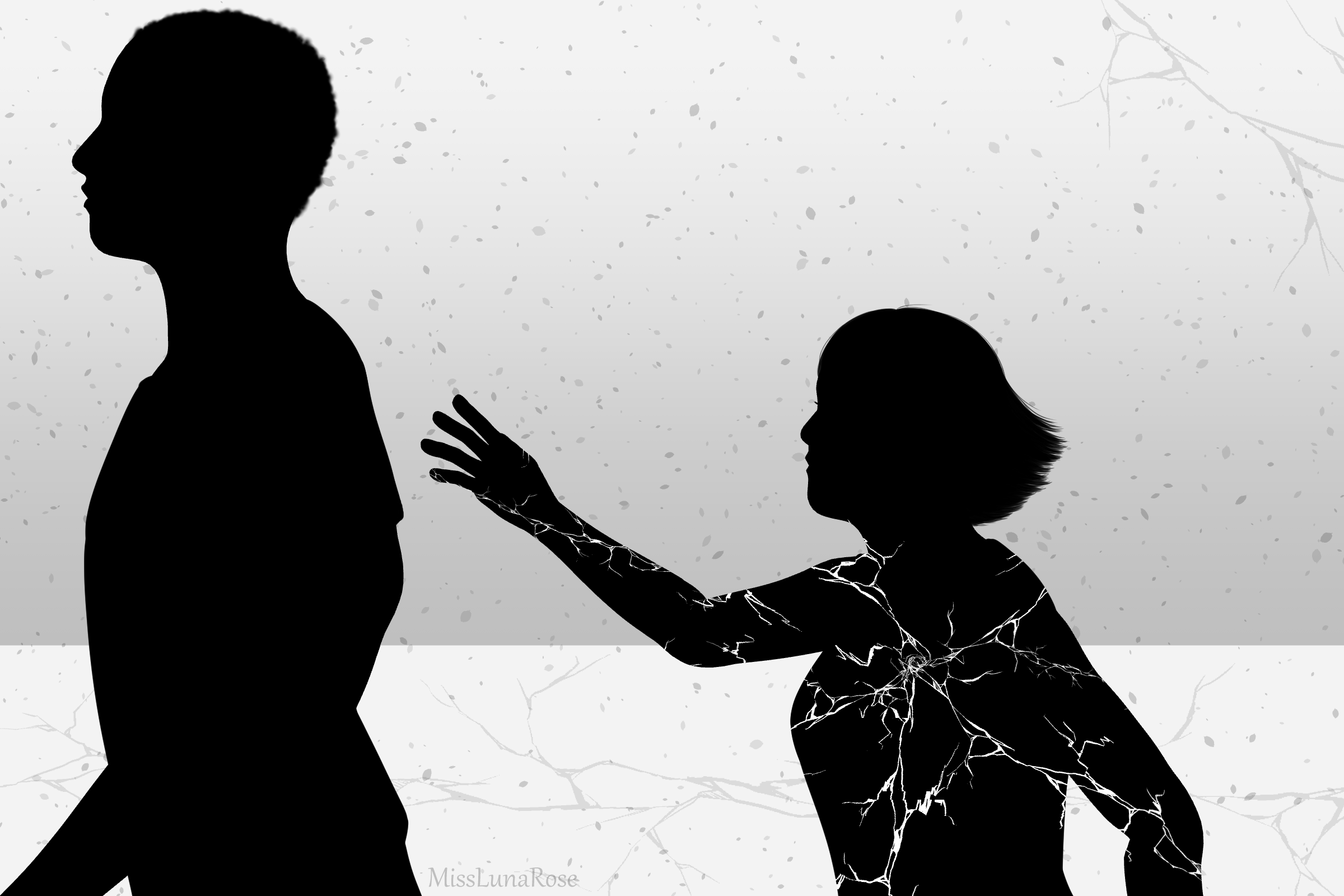
One of the symptoms of BPD is an intense fear of emotional abandonment.

The distinguishing characteristics of borderline personality disorder (BPD) include a pervasive pattern of instability in one's interpersonal relationships and in one's self-image, with frequent oscillation between extremes of idealization and devaluation of others and self, alongside fluctuating moods and difficulty regulating intense emotional reactions. Dangerous or impulsive behaviors are commonly associated with BPD.

Additional symptoms may encompass uncertainty about one's identity, values, morals, and beliefs; experiencing paranoid thoughts under stress; episodes of depersonalization; and, in moderate to severe cases, stress-induced breaks with reality or episodes of psychosis. It is also common for individuals with BPD to have comorbid conditions such as depressive or bipolar disorders, substance use disorders, eating disorders, post-traumatic stress disorder (PTSD), and attention deficit hyperactivity disorder (ADHD).

=== Emotional dysregulation ===
Emotional dysregulation is a core feature of BPD and it is characterized by a difficulty in effectively managing emotional states. It may involve high sensitivity to emotional stimuli, heightened emotional intensity, large and rapid mood shifts, tendency for negative emotions, high affective empathy but low cognitive empathy, and a slow return to baseline after emotional arousal. Emotional dysregulation extends beyond emotions, affecting cognition, relationships, and behavior.

Deficits in emotion regulation strategies are observed in BPD. These include resistance to accepting emotional responses, low flexibility to changing strategies, difficulty in identifying emotions, as well as a deficit in goal-directed behavior, and in using healthy coping strategies. Maladaptive strategies commonly used to regulate their emotions include self-harm, rumination, avoidance, and thought suppression.

Emotional dysregulation is thought to be caused by an imbalance in the limbic system and the prefrontal cortex, particularly in the amygdala. Dialectical behavior therapy can be employed to help with emotional dysregulation.

=== Interpersonal relationships ===
Interpersonal relationships are significantly impacted in individuals with BPD, characterized by a heightened sensitivity to the behavior and actions of others. Individuals with BPD can be acutely conscious of and susceptible to their perceived or real treatment by others. Individuals may experience profound happiness and gratitude for perceived kindness, yet feel intense sadness or anger towards perceived criticism or harm. A notable feature of BPD is the tendency to engage in idealization and devaluation of others—that is to idealize and subsequently devalue others—oscillating between extreme admiration and profound mistrust or dislike. This pattern, referred to as "splitting", can significantly influence the dynamics of interpersonal relationships. In addition to this external "splitting", patients with BPD typically have internal splitting, i.e. vacillation between considering oneself a good person who has been mistreated (in which case anger predominates) and a bad person whose life has no value (in which case self-destructive or even suicidal behavior may occur). This splitting is also evident in black-and-white or all-or-nothing dichotomous thinking.

Despite a strong desire for intimacy, individuals with BPD may exhibit insecure, avoidant, ambivalent, or fearfully preoccupied attachment styles in relationships, complicating their interactions and connections with others. Family members, including parents of adults with BPD, may find themselves in a cycle of being overly involved in the individual's life at times and, at other times, significantly detached, contributing to a sense of alienation within the family unit. Anthropologist Rebecca Lester argues that BPD is a disorder of relationships and communication, namely that a person with BPD lacks the communication skills and knowledge to interact effectively with others within their society and culture given their life experience.

Personality disorders, including BPD, are associated with an increased incidence of chronic stress and conflict, reduced satisfaction in romantic partnerships, domestic abuse, and unintended pregnancies. Research indicates variability in relationship patterns among individuals with BPD. A portion of these individuals may transition rapidly between relationships, a pattern metaphorically described as "butterfly-like", characterized by fleeting and transient interactions and "fluttering" in and out of relationships. Conversely, a subgroup, referred to as "attached", tends to establish fewer but more intense and dependent relationships. These connections often form rapidly, evolving into deeply intertwined and tumultuous bonds. In certain cases, BPD may be recognized as a disability within the workplace, particularly if the condition's severity results in behaviors that undermine relationships, involve engagement in risky activities, or manifest as intense anger, thereby inhibiting the individual's ability to perform their job role effectively. Individuals with BPD express higher levels of jealousy towards their partners in romantic relations.

Manipulative behavior to obtain nurturance is considered by the DSM-IV-TR and many mental health professionals to be a characteristic of borderline personality disorder. In one research study, 88% of therapists reported that they have experienced manipulation attempts from patient(s). Marsha Linehan has argued that doing so relies upon the assumption that people with BPD who communicate intense pain, or who engage in self-harm and suicidal behavior, do so to influence the behavior of others. The impact of such behavior on others—often an intense emotional reaction in concerned friends, family members, and therapists—is thus assumed to have been the person's intention. According to Linehan, their frequent expressions of intense pain, self-harming, or suicidal behavior may instead represent a method of mood regulation or an escape mechanism from situations that feel unbearable, however, making their assumed manipulative behavior an involuntary and unintentional response.

=== Behavior ===
Behavioral patterns associated with BPD frequently involve impulsive actions, which may manifest as substance use disorders, binge eating, unprotected sexual encounters, and self-injury, among other self-harming practices. These behaviors are a response to the intense emotional distress experienced by individuals with BPD, serving as an immediate but temporary alleviation of their emotional pain. However, such actions typically result in feelings of shame and guilt, contributing to a recurrent cycle. This cycle typically begins with emotional discomfort, followed by impulsive behavior aimed at mitigating this discomfort, only to lead to shame and guilt, which in turn exacerbates the emotional pain. This escalation of emotional pain then intensifies the compulsion towards impulsive behavior as a form of relief, creating a vicious cycle. Over time, these impulsive responses can become an automatic mechanism for coping with emotional pain. Interventions such as dialectical behavior therapy (DBT) and schema therapy aim to disrupt this cycle by improving emotional regulation, distress tolerance, and adaptive coping strategies.

=== Self-harm and suicidality ===
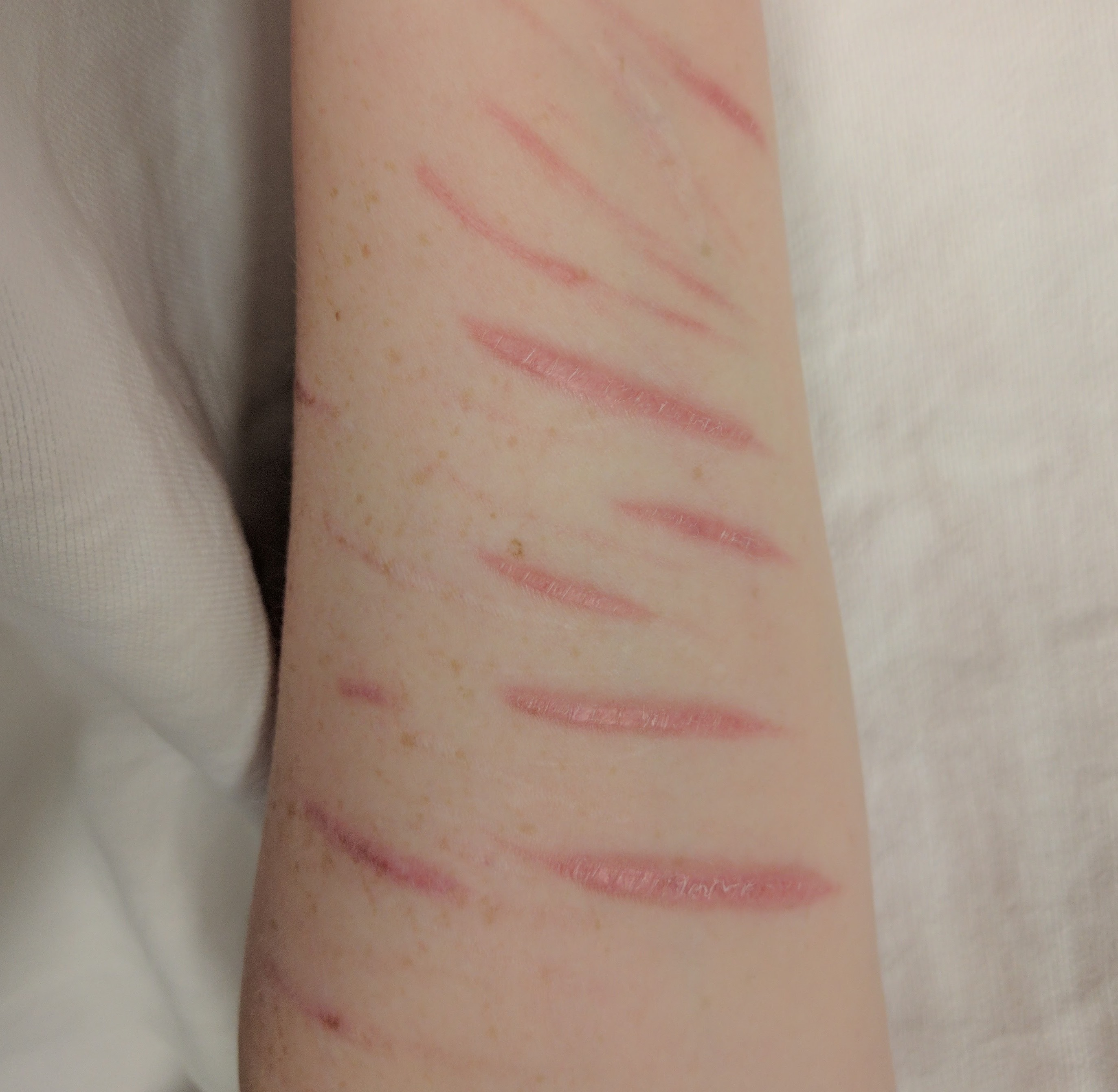
Scars that resulted from prior self-harm

Self-harm and suicidal behaviors are core diagnostic criteria for BPD as outlined in the DSM-5. Between 50% and 80% of individuals diagnosed with BPD engage in self-harm, with cutting being the most common method. Other methods, such as bruising, burning, head banging, or biting, are also prevalent. It is hypothesized that individuals with BPD might experience a sense of emotional relief following acts of self-harm.

The motivations behind self-harm and suicide attempts among individuals with BPD are reported to differ. Nearly 70% of individuals with BPD engage in self-harm without the intention of ending their lives. Motivations for self-harm include expressing anger, self-punishment, inducing normal feelings or feelings of normality in response to dissociative episodes, and distraction from emotional distress or challenging situations. Conversely, true suicide attempts by individuals with BPD are frequently motivated by the notion that others will be better off in their absence.

=== Sense of self and self-concept ===
Individuals diagnosed with BPD frequently experience significant difficulties in maintaining a stable self-concept. This identity disturbance manifests as uncertainty in personal values, beliefs, preferences, and interests. They may also express confusion regarding their aspirations and objectives in terms of relationships and career paths. Such indeterminacy leads to feelings of emptiness and a profound sense of disorientation regarding their own identity. Moreover, their self-perception can fluctuate dramatically over short periods, oscillating between positive and negative evaluations. Consequently, individuals with BPD might adopt their sense of self based on their surroundings or the people they interact with, resulting in a chameleon-like adaptation of identity, known as mirroring. This can also often lead to pervasive emotional contagion.

=== Dissociation and cognitive challenges ===
The heightened emotional states experienced by individuals with BPD can impede their ability to concentrate and cognitively function. Additionally, individuals with BPD may frequently dissociate, which can be regarded as a mild to severe disconnection from physical and emotional experiences. Observers may notice signs of dissociation in individuals with BPD through diminished expressiveness in their face or voice, or an apparent disconnection and insensitivity to emotional cues or stimuli.

Researchers disagree about whether dissociation or a sense of emotional detachment and physical experiences impact the ability of people with BPD to recall the specifics of past events. A 1999 study reported that the specificity of autobiographical memory was decreased in BPD patients. The researchers found that decreased ability to recall specifics was correlated with patients' levels of dissociation, which "may help them to avoid episodic information that would evoke acutely negative affect".

=== Psychotic symptoms ===
BPD is predominantly characterized as a disorder involving emotional dysregulation, yet psychotic symptoms frequently occur in individuals with BPD, with about 20–50% of patients reporting psychotic symptoms. These manifestations have historically been labeled as "pseudo-psychotic" or "psychotic-like", implying a differentiation from symptoms observed in primary psychotic disorders. Studies conducted in the 2010s suggest a closer similarity between psychotic symptoms in BPD and those in recognized psychotic disorders than previously understood. The distinction of pseudo-psychosis has faced criticism for its weak construct validity and the potential to diminish the perceived severity of these symptoms, potentially hindering accurate diagnosis and effective treatment. Consequently, there are suggestions from some in the research community to categorize these symptoms as genuine psychosis, advocating for the abolition of the distinction between pseudo-psychosis and true psychosis. The DSM-5 identifies transient paranoia, exacerbated by stress, as a symptom of BPD. Research has identified the presence of both hallucinations and delusions in individuals with BPD who do not possess an alternate diagnosis that would better explain these symptoms. Further, phenomenological analysis indicates that auditory verbal hallucinations in BPD patients are indistinguishable from those observed in schizophrenia. This has led to suggestions of a potential shared etiological basis for hallucinations across BPD and other disorders, including psychotic and affective disorders.

== Causes ==
The etiology, or causes, of BPD involves several causes, with no consensus on a single one. BPD may share a connection with post-traumatic stress disorder (PTSD), with both having a traumatic substrate. While childhood trauma is a recognized contributing factor, the roles of congenital brain abnormalities, genetics, neurobiology, and non-traumatic environmental factors remain subjects of ongoing investigation.

=== Genetics and heritability ===
Compared to other major psychiatric conditions, the exploration of genetic underpinnings in BPD remains novel. Estimates suggest the heritability of BPD ranges from 37% to 69%, indicating that human genetic variations account for a substantial portion of the risk for BPD within the population. Twin studies, which often form the basis of these estimates, may overestimate the perceived influence of genetics due to the shared environment of twins, potentially skewing results.

Certain studies propose that personality disorders are significantly shaped by genetics, more so than many Axis I disorders, such as depression and eating disorders, and even surpassing the genetic impact on broad personality traits. A twin study found that BPD ranks as the third most heritable among ten surveyed personality disorders.

Research involving twin and sibling studies has shown a genetic component to traits associated with BPD, such as impulsive aggression; with the genetic contribution to behavior from serotonin-related genes appearing to be modest.

A study conducted by Trull et al. in the Netherlands, which included 711 sibling pairs and 561 parents, aimed to identify genetic markers associated with BPD. This research identified a linkage to genetic markers on chromosome 9 as relevant to BPD characteristics, indicating a significant genetic contribution to the variability observed in BPD features. Prior findings from this group indicated that 42% of BPD feature variability could be attributed to genetics, with the remaining 58% owing to environmental factors.

Among specific genetic variants under scrutiny as of 2012, the DRD4 7-repeat polymorphism (of the dopamine receptor D_{4}) located on chromosome 11 has been linked to disorganized attachment, and in conjunction with the 10/10-repeat genotype of the dopamine transporter (DAT), it has been associated with issues with inhibitory control, both of which are characteristic of BPD.

=== Psychosocial factors ===
Empirical studies have established a strong correlation between adverse childhood experiences such as child abuse, particularly child sexual abuse, and the onset of BPD later in life. Reports from individuals diagnosed with BPD frequently include narratives of extensive abuse and neglect during early childhood, though causality remains a subject of ongoing investigation. These individuals are significantly more prone to recount experiences of verbal, emotional, physical, or sexual abuse by caregivers, alongside a notable frequency of incest and loss of caregivers in early childhood.

Moreover, there have been consistent accounts of caregivers invalidating the individuals' emotions and thoughts, neglecting physical care, failing to provide the necessary protection, and exhibiting emotional withdrawal and inconsistency. Specifically, female individuals with BPD reporting past neglect or abuse by caregivers have a heightened likelihood of encountering sexual abuse from individuals outside their immediate family circle. Research also indicates that neurodevelopment variations such as autism spectrum traits, ADHD, or highly sensitive people (HSP) may increase vulnerability to trauma and subsequent borderline personality organization.

The enduring impact of chronic maltreatment and difficulties in forming secure attachments during childhood has been hypothesized to potentially contribute to the development of BPD. Marsha Linehan's biosocial developmental theory posits that BPD arises from the interaction between a child's inherent emotional vulnerability and an invalidating environment—an environment characterized by the neglect, ridicule, dismissal, or discouragement of a child's emotions and needs. Due to it drawing on attachment theory, which centers Western nuclear family norms, the diagnosis of BPD has been critiqued by Indigenous and decolonial scholars for possibly pathologizing Indigenous and collectivist cultural forms of caregiving.

=== Brain and neurobiologic factors ===
Research employing structural neuroimaging techniques, such as voxel-based morphometry, has reported variations in individuals diagnosed with BPD in specific brain regions that have been associated with the psychopathology of BPD. Reductions in volume enclosed have been observed in the hippocampus, orbitofrontal cortex, anterior cingulate cortex, and amygdala, among others, which are central to emotional self-regulation and stress management.

In addition to structural imaging, a subset of studies utilizing magnetic resonance spectroscopy has investigated the neurometabolic profile within these affected regions. These investigations have focused on the concentrations of various neurometabolites, including N-acetylaspartate, creatine, compounds related to glutamate, and compounds containing choline. These studies aim to show the biochemical alterations that may underlie the symptomatology observed in BPD.

==== Neurological patterns ====
Research has shown changes in two brain circuits implicated in the emotional dysregulation characteristic of BPD: firstly, an escalation in activity within brain circuits associated with experiencing severe emotional pain, and secondly, a decreased activation within circuits tasked with the regulation or suppression of these intense emotions. These dysfunctional activations predominantly occur within the limbic system, though individual variances necessitate further neuroimaging research to explore these patterns in detail.

Contrary to earlier findings, individuals with BPD exhibit decreased amygdala activation in response to heightened negative emotional stimuli compared to control groups. John Krystal, the editor of Biological Psychiatry, commented on these findings, suggesting they contribute to understanding the innate neurological predisposition of individuals with BPD to lead emotionally turbulent lives, which are not inherently negative or unproductive. This emotional volatility is consistently linked to disparities in several brain regions, emphasizing the neurobiological underpinnings of BPD.

=== Mediating and moderating factors ===
==== Executive function and social rejection sensitivity ====
High sensitivity to social rejection is linked to more severe symptoms of BPD, with executive function playing a mediating role. Executive function—encompassing planning, working memory, attentional control, and problem-solving—moderates how rejection sensitivity influences BPD symptoms. Studies demonstrate that individuals with lower executive function exhibit a stronger correlation between rejection sensitivity and BPD symptoms. Conversely, higher executive function may mitigate the impact of rejection sensitivity, potentially offering protection against BPD symptoms.

== Diagnosis ==
The clinical diagnosis of BPD can be made through a psychiatric assessment conducted by a mental health professional, ideally a psychiatrist or psychologist. This comprehensive assessment integrates various sources of information to confirm the diagnosis, encompassing the patient's self-reported clinical history, observations made by the clinician during interviews, and corroborative details obtained from family members, friends, and medical records. Patients should be thoroughly assessed for co-morbid mental health conditions, substance use disorders, suicidal ideation, and any self-harming behaviors.

An effective approach involves presenting the criteria of the disorder to the individual and inquiring if they perceive these criteria as reflective of their experiences. Involving individuals in the diagnostic process may enhance their acceptance of the diagnosis. Despite the stigma associated with BPD and previous notions of its untreatability, disclosing the diagnosis to individuals is generally beneficial. It provides them with validation and directs them to appropriate treatment options.

The psychological evaluation for BPD typically explores the onset and intensity of symptoms and their impact on the individual's quality of life. Critical areas of focus include suicidal thoughts, self-harm behaviors, and any thoughts of harming others. The diagnosis relies on both the individual's self-reported symptoms and the clinician's observations. To exclude other potential causes of the symptoms, additional assessments may include a physical examination and blood tests, to exclude thyroid disorders or substance use disorders.

=== Classification ===
Classification of personality disorders differs significantly between the two most prominent frameworks for classification of mental disorders, namely: the Diagnostic and Statistical Manual of Mental Disorders and the International Classification of Diseases, the most recent editions of which are the DSM-5-TR and ICD-11, respectively. While personality disorders, including BPD, are diagnosed as separate entities in the DSM-5; in the ICD-11 classification of personality disorders, they are assessed in terms of severity levels, with trait and pattern specifiers serving to characterize the particular style of pathology. There is also a hybrid model, called the Alternative DSM-5 model for personality disorders, which defines BPD and five other PDs through disorder-specific combinations of pathological traits and areas of overall impairment.

==== DSM-5 ====
The multiaxial diagnostic system of previous editions has been eliminated with the introduction of the DSM-5, with all disorders, including personality disorders, being integrated into Section II of the manual. For a diagnosis of BPD, an individual must meet five out of nine specified diagnostic criteria. The DSM-5 characterizes BPD as a pervasive pattern of instability in interpersonal relationships, self-image, affect, and a significant propensity towards impulsive behavior. Marsha Linehan highlights the diagnostic challenges faced by mental health professionals in using the DSM criteria due to the broad range of behaviors they encompass. To mitigate these challenges, Linehan categorizes BPD symptoms into five principal areas of dysregulation: emotions, behavior, interpersonal relationships, sense of self, and cognition.

Moreover, the Alternative DSM-5 Model for Personality Disorders (AMPD), located in Section III of the DSM-5, defines six specific personality disorders—one of them being BPD—in terms of a description of the disorder; the characteristic manner in which the disorder impacts personality functioning, i.e. identity, self-direction, empathy and intimacy (criterion A); as well as a listing and description of the pathological personality traits associated with the disorder (criterion B). In the case of BPD, this necessitates the identification of at least four out of seven maladaptive traits, these being: emotional lability, anxiousness, separation insecurity, depressivity, impulsivity, risk-taking, and hostility, of which at least one must be of the three last mentioned. These traits have been found to correspond well to BPD as defined in the categorical model.

==== ICD-11 ====
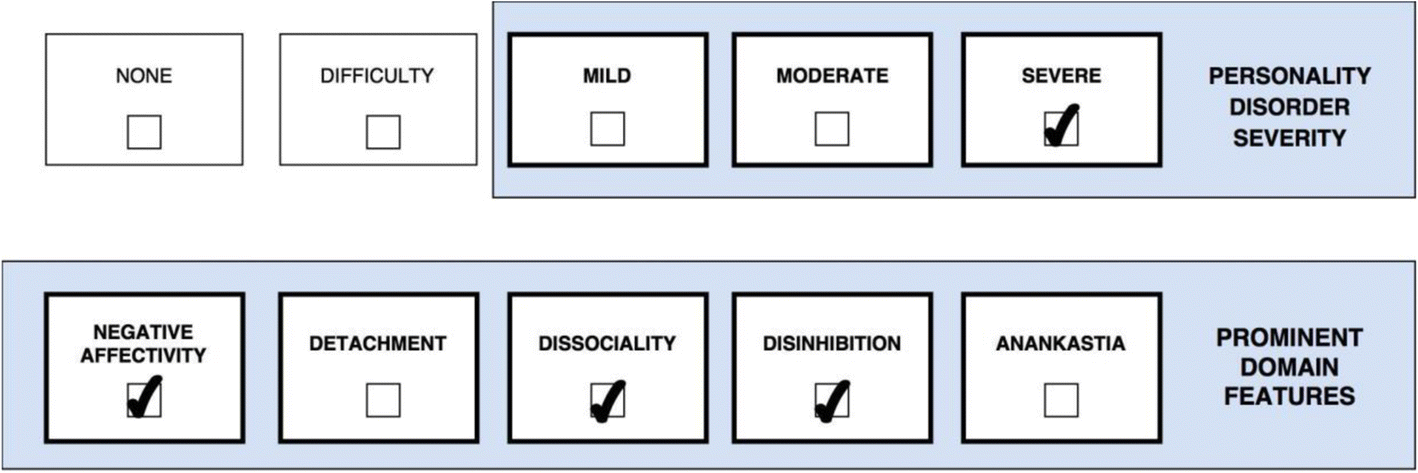
Without the borderline pattern qualifier, an ICD-11 case profile could look like this for someone diagnosed with emotionally unstable PD in accordance with the ICD-10.

The World Health Organization's ICD-11 has replaced the categorical classification of personality disorders in the ICD-10 with a dimensional model containing a unified personality disorder with severity specifiers, along with specifiers for prominent personality traits or patterns. Among these is the borderline pattern, which is similar to the diagnosis of BPD.

The borderline pattern specifier is described in the ICD-11 as applicable to "individuals whose pattern of personality disturbance is characterized by a pervasive pattern of instability of interpersonal relationships, self-image, and affects, and marked impulsivity". Borderline personality disorder has been found to be primarily associated with the ICD-11 trait domains of Negative Affectivity and Disinhibition, reflecting core features such as emotional instability and impulsivity. Previously, the ICD-10 had identified a condition akin to BPD, termed Emotionally unstable personality disorder (EUPD).

The ICD-11 borderline pattern diagnosis has been criticized for being "indissociable" from negative affectivity upon undergoing regression and factor analyses. A study has found that the diagnosis of borderline pattern does not provide additional insight beyond what is captured by other specifiers, positing that it may be redundant. Apart from negative affectivity and disinhibition, research has found "substantial but mixed" associations with the other trait domains, indicating the heterogeneity of the diagnosis, which aligns with the view of BPD as an "index of global personality pathology and severity, which aligns with the original metaphorical use of the term 'borderline' or 'borderland'". It is suggested that it "therefore seems reasonable if the borderline pattern serves as a transitional specifier that eventually is phased out in the coming era".

=== Millon's subtypes ===
Psychologist Theodore Millon proposed four subtypes of BPD, where individuals with BPD would exhibit none, one, or multiple subtypes.

Subtype	Features	Traits
Discouraged borderline	Including avoidant, depressive, and dependent features	Pliant, submissive, loyal, humble; feels vulnerable and in constant jeopardy; feels hopeless, depressed, helpless, and powerless.
Impulsive borderline	Including histrionic and antisocial features	Capricious, superficial, flighty, distractible, frenetic, and seductive; fearing loss, becomes agitated, and gloomy and irritable; potentially suicidal.
Petulant borderline	Including negativistic features	Negativistic, impatient, restless, as well as stubborn, defiant, sullen, pessimistic, and resentful; easily slighted and quickly disillusioned.
Self-destructive borderline	Including depressive and masochistic features	Inward-turning, intropunitively angry; conforming, deferential, and ingratiating behaviors have deteriorated; increasingly high-strung and moody; possibly suicidal.

=== Misdiagnosis ===
Individuals with BPD are subject to misdiagnosis due to various factors, such as the overlap (comorbidity) of BPD symptoms with those of other disorders such as depression, psychotic disorders, PTSD, and bipolar disorder. Misdiagnosis of BPD can lead to a range of adverse consequences. Diagnosis informs healthcare professionals about the patient's mental health status, guiding treatment strategies, and enabling accurate reporting of successful interventions. Consequently, misdiagnosis may deprive individuals of access to suitable psychiatric medications or evidence-based psychological interventions tailored to their specific disorders.

=== Adolescence and prodrome ===
The onset of BPD symptoms typically occurs during adolescence or early adulthood, with possible early signs in childhood. Predictive symptoms in adolescents include body image issues, extreme sensitivity to rejection, behavioral challenges, non-suicidal self-injury, seeking exclusive relationships, and profound shame. Although many adolescents exhibit these symptoms without developing BPD, those who do are significantly more likely to develop the disorder and potentially face long-term social challenges.

BPD is recognized as a stable and valid diagnosis during adolescence, supported by the DSM-5 and ICD-11. Early detection and treatment of BPD in young individuals are emphasized in national guidelines across various countries, including the US, Australia, the UK, Spain, and Switzerland, highlighting the importance of early intervention.

Historically, diagnosing BPD during adolescence was met with caution, due to concerns about the accuracy of diagnosing young individuals, the potential misinterpretation of normal adolescent behaviors, stigma, and the stability of personality during this developmental stage. Even so, research has confirmed the validity and clinical utility of the BPD diagnosis in adolescents, though misconceptions persist among mental health care professionals, contributing to clinical reluctance in diagnosing and a key barrier to the provision of effective treatment of BPD in this population.

A diagnosis of BPD in adolescence can indicate the persistence of the disorder into adulthood, with outcomes varying among individuals. Some maintain a stable diagnosis over time, while others may not consistently meet the diagnostic criteria. Early diagnosis helps develop effective treatment plans, including family therapy, to support adolescents with BPD.

=== Differential diagnosis and comorbidity ===
Lifetime comorbid conditions are prevalent among individuals diagnosed with BPD. Individuals with BPD exhibit higher rates of comorbidity compared to those diagnosed with other personality disorders. These comorbidities include mood disorders (such as major depressive disorder and bipolar disorder), anxiety disorders (including panic disorder, social anxiety disorder, and post-traumatic stress disorder (PTSD)), other personality disorders (notably schizotypal, antisocial, and dependent personality disorder), substance use disorder, eating disorders (anorexia nervosa and bulimia nervosa), attention deficit hyperactivity disorder (ADHD), somatic symptom disorder, and the dissociative disorders. It is advised that a personality disorder diagnosis should be made cautiously during untreated mood episodes or disorders unless a comprehensive lifetime history supports the existence of a personality disorder.

==== Mood disorders ====
Seventy-five percent (75%) of individuals with BPD concurrently experience mood disorders, notably major depressive disorder (MDD) or bipolar disorder (BD), complicating diagnostic clarity due to overlapping symptoms. Distinguishing BPD from BD is particularly challenging, as behaviors which are part of diagnostic criteria for both BPD and BD may emerge during depressive or manic episodes in BD. However, these behaviors are likely to subside as mood normalises in BD to euthymia, but typically are pervasive in BPD.

Differences between BPD and BD mood swings include their duration, with BD episodes typically lasting for at least two weeks at a time, (Note: An exception is rapid-cycling BD, which can be challenging to differentiate from the affective lability found in BPD.) in contrast to the rapid and transient mood shifts seen in BPD. Additionally, BD mood changes are generally unresponsive to environmental stimuli, whereas BPD moods are. For example, a positive event might alleviate a depressive mood in BPD, responsiveness not observed in BD. Furthermore, the euphoria in BPD lacks the racing thoughts and reduced need for sleep characteristic of BD, though sleep disturbances have been noted in BPD.

Historically, BPD was considered a milder form of BD, or part of the bipolar spectrum. However, distinctions in phenomenology, family history, disease progression, and treatment responses refute a singular underlying mechanism for both conditions. Research indicates only a modest association between BPD and BD, challenging the notion of a close spectrum relationship.

==== Premenstrual dysphoric disorder ====
BPD is a psychiatric condition distinguishable from premenstrual dysphoric disorder (PMDD), despite some symptom overlap. BPD affects individuals persistently across all stages of the menstrual cycle, unlike PMDD, which is confined to the luteal phase and ends with menstruation. While PMDD, affecting 3–8% of women, includes mood swings, irritability, and anxiety tied to the menstrual cycle, BPD presents a broader, constant emotional and behavioral challenge irrespective of hormonal changes.

==== Comorbid personality disorders ====
Approximately 74% of individuals with BPD also fulfill criteria for another personality disorder during their lifetime, according to research published in 2008. The most prevalent co-occurring disorders are from Cluster A (paranoid, schizoid, and schizotypal personality disorders), affecting about half of those with BPD, with schizotypal personality disorder alone impacting one-third of individuals. Being part of Cluster B, BPD patients also commonly share characteristics with other Cluster B disorders (antisocial, histrionic, and narcissistic personality disorders), with nearly half of individuals with BPD showing signs of these conditions, and narcissistic personality disorder affecting roughly one-third. Cluster C disorders (avoidant, dependent, and obsessive-compulsive personality disorders) have the least comorbidity with BPD, with just under a third of individuals with BPD meeting the criteria for a Cluster C disorder.

== Management ==
The main approach to managing BPD is through psychotherapy, with a few different interventions having demonstrated a reduction in symptoms and an increase in well-being. While medications do not directly treat BPD, they are beneficial in managing comorbid conditions like depression and anxiety. Evidence states short-term hospitalization does not offer advantages over community care in terms of enhancing outcomes or in the long-term prevention of suicidal behavior among individuals with BPD.

=== Psychotherapy ===
The stages used in dialectical behavior therapy

Long-term, consistent psychotherapy is the preferred method for treating BPD, and engagement in any therapeutic approach tends to surpass the absence of treatment, particularly in diminishing self-harm impulses. Among the effective psychotherapeutic approaches, dialectical behavior therapy (DBT), schema therapy, and psychodynamic therapies have shown efficacy, although improvements may require extensive time, often years of dedicated effort.

Available treatments for BPD include dynamic deconstructive psychotherapy (DDP), mentalization-based treatment (MBT), schema therapy, transference-focused psychotherapy, dialectical behavior therapy (DBT), and general psychiatric management. The effectiveness of these therapies does not significantly vary between more intensive and less intensive approaches.

Transference-focused psychotherapy is designed to mitigate absolutist thinking by encouraging individuals to express their interpretations of social interactions and their emotions, thereby encouraging more precise and flexible categorizations. Dialectical behavior therapy (DBT), on the other hand, focuses on developing skills in four main areas: interpersonal communication, distress tolerance, emotional regulation, and mindfulness, aiming to equip individuals with BPD with tools to manage intense emotions and improve interpersonal relationships.

Cognitive behavioral therapy (CBT) targets the modification of behaviors and beliefs through problem identification related to BPD, showing efficacy in reducing anxiety, mood symptoms, suicidal ideation, and self-harming actions.

Mentalization-based therapy and transference-focused psychotherapy draw from psychodynamic principles, while DBT is rooted in cognitive-behavioral principles and mindfulness. General psychiatric management integrates key aspects from these treatments and is seen as more accessible and less resource-intensive. Studies suggest DBT and MBT may be particularly effective, with ongoing research into developing abbreviated forms of these therapies to enhance accessibility and reduce both financial and resource burdens on patients and providers.

Schema therapy considers early maladaptive schemas, conceptualized as organized patterns that recur throughout life in response to memories, emotions, bodily sensations, and cognitions associated with unmet childhood needs.

Additionally, mindfulness meditation has been associated with positive structural changes in the brain and improvements in BPD symptoms, with some participants in mindfulness-based interventions no longer meeting the diagnostic criteria for BPD after treatment.

=== Medications ===
There are no clear pharmacological guidelines for borderline personality disorder; psychotherapy is considered the primary treatment, with medications used cautiously for common comorbidities.

Topiramate (strong), lamotrigine (moderate), and aripiprazole (moderate) show evidence for reducing anger and hostility in BPD.

Evidence for ketamine in unresponsive depression in BPD is limited.

Despite the lack of solid evidence, SSRIs and SNRIs are prescribed off-label for BPD and are typically considered adjunctive to psychotherapy.

Pharmacological treatments appear to have minimal impact on brain activity and connectivity in borderline personality disorder patients during emotional processing, suggesting that observed neural alterations are largely independent of medication effects.

=== Health care services ===
The disparity between those benefiting from treatment and those receiving it, known as the "treatment gap", arises from several factors. These include reluctance to seek treatment, healthcare providers' underdiagnosis, and limited availability and accessibility to advanced treatments. Furthermore, establishing clear pathways to services and medical care remains a challenge, complicating access to treatment for individuals with BPD. Despite efforts, many healthcare providers lack the training or resources to address severe BPD effectively, an issue acknowledged by both affected individuals and medical professionals.

In the context of psychiatric hospitalizations, individuals with BPD constitute approximately 20% of admissions. While many engage in outpatient treatment consistently over several years, reliance on more restrictive and expensive treatment options, such as inpatient admission, tends to decrease over time.

Service experiences vary among individuals with BPD. Assessing suicide risk poses a challenge for clinicians, with patients underestimating the lethality of self-harm behaviors. The suicide risk among people with BPD is significantly higher than that of the general population, characterized by a history of multiple suicide attempts during crises.

==== Problems in treatment ====
People with BPD are considered to be among the most challenging groups of patients to work with in therapy, requiring a high level of skill and training for the psychiatrists, therapists, and nurses involved in their treatment. A majority of psychiatric staff report finding individuals with BPD moderately to extremely difficult to work with and more difficult than other client groups. This largely negative view of BPD can result in people with BPD being terminated from treatment early, being provided harmful treatment, not being informed of their diagnosis of BPD, or being misdiagnosed. Mental health professionals frequently refuse to provide services to those who have received a BPD diagnosis.

With healthcare providers contributing to the stigma of a BPD diagnosis, seeking treatment can often result in the perpetuation of BPD features. Efforts are ongoing to improve public and staff attitudes toward people with BPD.

== Prognosis ==
With treatment, the majority of people with BPD can find relief from distressing symptoms and achieve remission, defined as a consistent relief from symptoms for at least two years. Remission rates are about 50–70% over five years. The remission rate is estimated to be around 50% at ten years, with 93% of people being able to achieve a two-year remission and 86% achieving at least a four-year remission, with a 30% risk of relapse over 10 years.

Patient personality can play an important role during the therapeutic process, leading to better clinical outcomes. Recent research has shown that BPD patients undergoing dialectical behavior therapy (DBT) exhibit better clinical outcomes correlated with higher levels of the trait of agreeableness in the patient, compared to patients either low in agreeableness or not being treated with DBT. This association was mediated through the strength of a working alliance between patient and therapist; that is, more agreeable patients developed stronger working alliances with their therapists, which, in turn, led to better clinical outcomes.

In addition to recovering from distressing symptoms, people with BPD can also achieve high levels of psychosocial functioning. A longitudinal study tracking the social and work abilities of participants with BPD found that six years after diagnosis, 56% of participants had good function in work and social environments, compared to 26% of participants when they were first diagnosed. Vocational achievement was generally more limited, even compared to those with other personality disorders. However, those whose symptoms had remitted were significantly more likely to have good relationships with a romantic partner and at least one parent, good performance at work and school, a sustained work and school history, and good psychosocial functioning overall.

Estimates of the lifetime risk of death by suicide among individuals with BPD range between 3% and 10%, varying with the method of investigation. In a study examining completed suicides among individuals aged 18 to 35, 30% of the suicides were attributed to people with BPD, with a majority being men, and almost none receiving treatment. Similar findings were reported in another study. Among men diagnosed with BPD, there is also evidence of a higher suicide rate: "men are more than twice as likely as women—18 percent versus 8 percent"—to die by suicide. There is evidence that a significant proportion of males who die by suicide may have undiagnosed BPD. About half of all individuals who commit suicide are diagnosed with a personality disorder, with BPD being the most common association.

== Epidemiology ==
BPD has a point prevalence of 1.6% and a lifetime prevalence of 5.9% of the global population. Within clinical settings, the occurrence of BPD is 6.4% among urban primary care patients, 9.3% among psychiatric outpatients, and approximately 20% among psychiatric inpatients. Utilization of healthcare resources by individuals with BPD is high. Up to half may show significant improvement in their condition, resulting in ineligibility for diagnosis of BPD, following a ten-year period with appropriate treatment.

Regarding gender distribution, women are diagnosed with BPD three times more frequently than men in clinical environments. Nonetheless, epidemiological research in the United States indicates no significant gender difference in the lifetime prevalence of BPD within the general population. Feminist scholars argue that the diagnosis is disproportionately applied to women, particularly survivors of childhood sexual abuse, and that it pathologizes the understandable emotional and relational responses to gendered violence.

The relationship between BPD and ethnicity continues to be ambiguous, with divergent findings reported in the United States. The overall prevalence of BPD in the U.S. prison population is thought to be 17%. Sexual minorities (i.e., lesbian, gay, bisexual) are up to 3.82 times more likely to be diagnosed with BPD and gender minorities (i.e., transgender and gender diverse) are up to 4.05 times more likely to be diagnosed. These disparities persist even when symptom levels are comparable, suggesting diagnostic bias and the potential pathologizing of minority stress.

=== Gender ===
In a clinic, up to 80% of patients are women, but this might not necessarily reflect the gender distribution in the entire population. According to Joel Paris, the primary reason for gender disparities in clinical settings is that women are more likely to develop symptoms that prompt them to seek help. Statistics indicate that twice as many women as men in the community experience depression. Conversely, men more frequently meet criteria for substance use disorder and psychopathy, but tend not to seek treatment as often. Additionally, men and women with similar symptoms may manifest them differently. Men frequently exhibit behaviors such as increased alcohol consumption and criminal activity, while women may internalize anger, leading to conditions like depression and self-harm, such as cutting or overdosing. Hence, the gender gap observed in antisocial personality disorder and borderline personality disorder, which may share similar underlying pathologies but present different symptoms influenced by gender.

There are also sex differences in personality traits and Axis I and II comorbidity. Men with BPD are more likely to use substances recreationally, have explosive temper, high levels of novelty seeking and have (especially) antisocial, narcissistic, passive–aggressive or sadistic personality traits (male BPD being characterised by antisocial overtones). Women with BPD are more likely to have eating, mood, anxiety, and post-traumatic stress disorders.

== History ==
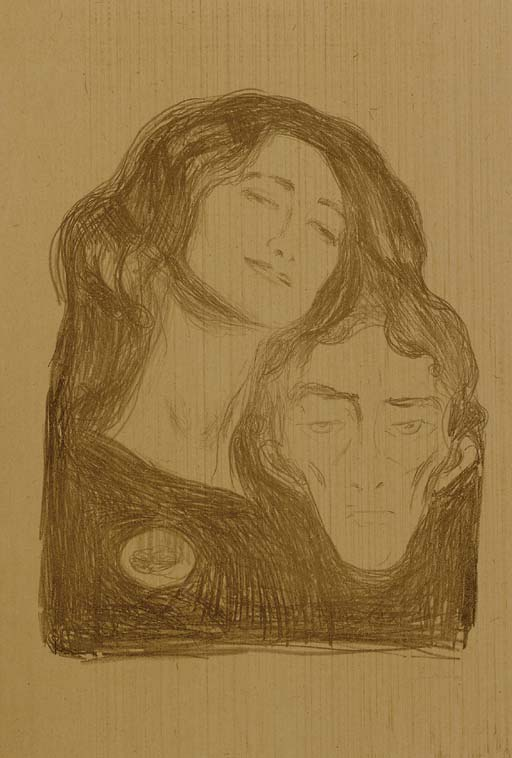
Devaluation, a common trait of BPD, in Edvard Munch's Salome (1903). The painter Edvard Munch depicted his new friend, the violinist Eva Mudocci, in both ways within months. First as a "stone that has fallen from my heart", then as Salome. In modern times, Munch has been suggested to have had BPD.

The coexistence of intense, divergent moods within an individual was recognized by Homer, Hippocrates, and Aretaeus, the last describing the vacillating presence of impulsive anger, melancholia, and mania within a single person. Swiss physician Théophile Bonet revived the concept in 1684, and used the term folie maniaco-mélancolique to describe the phenomenon of unstable moods that followed an unpredictable course. Other writers noted the same pattern, including the American psychiatrist Charles H. Hughes in 1884 and J. C. Rosse in 1890, who called the disorder "borderline insanity". In 1921, Emil Kraepelin identified an "excitable personality" that closely parallels the borderline features outlined in the current concept of BPD.

The idea that there were forms of disorder that were neither psychotic nor simply neurotic began to be discussed in psychoanalytic circles in the 1930s. The first formal definition of borderline disorder is widely acknowledged to have been written by Adolph Stern in 1938. He described a group of patients who he felt to be on the borderline between neurosis and psychosis, who often came from family backgrounds marked by trauma. He argued that such patients would often need more active support than that provided by classical psychoanalytic techniques.

The 1960s and 1970s saw a shift from thinking of the condition as borderline schizophrenia to thinking of it as a borderline affective disorder (mood disorder), on the fringes of bipolar disorder, cyclothymia, and dysthymia. In the DSM-II, stressing the intensity and variability of moods, it was called cyclothymic personality (affective personality). While the term "borderline" was evolving to refer to a distinct category of disorder, psychoanalysts such as Otto Kernberg were using it to refer to a broad spectrum of issues, describing an intermediate level of personality organization between neurosis and psychosis.

After standardized criteria were developed by John Gunderson to distinguish it from mood disorders and other Axis I disorders, BPD became a personality disorder diagnosis in 1980 with the publication of the DSM-III. The diagnosis was distinguished from sub-syndromal schizophrenia, which was termed "schizotypal personality disorder". The DSM-IV Axis II Work Group of the American Psychiatric Association finally decided on the name "borderline personality disorder", which is still in use by the DSM-5. However, the term "borderline" has been described as uniquely inadequate for describing the symptoms characteristic of this disorder.

Psychodynamic theorists have historically offered the most comprehensive theoretical models of BPD. Gunderson emphasized the patient's fundamental interpersonal hypersensitivity, which he viewed as partially genetic. Kernberg sees the disorder as one involving disturbed object relations, marked by an excess of aggression and use of primitive defenses, such as splitting, projection, and projective identification. Gerald Adler, writing from a self psychology perspective, viewed the disorder as resulting from the failure of evocative memory and characterized by an intolerance of aloneness. Masterson hypothesized that the disorder resulted from core developmental problems with separation-individuation. More recently, Fonagy and Bateman have proposed that the disorder stems from deficits in mentalization.

=== Etymology ===
Earlier versions of the DSM—before the multiaxial diagnosis system—classified most people with mental health problems into two categories: the psychotics and the neurotics. Clinicians noted a certain class of neurotics who, when in crisis, appeared to straddle the borderline into psychosis. The term "borderline personality disorder" was coined in American psychiatry in the 1960s. It became the preferred term over several competing names, such as "emotionally unstable character disorder" and "borderline schizophrenia", during the 1970s. Borderline personality disorder was included in DSM-III (1980) despite not being universally recognized as a valid diagnosis. Its validity was firmly established by the 1990s.

== Society and culture ==
=== Stigma ===
The features of BPD include emotional instability, intense and unstable interpersonal relationships, a need for intimacy, and a fear of rejection. As a result, people with BPD often evoke intense emotions in those around them. Pejorative terms to describe people with BPD, such as "difficult", "treatment resistant", "manipulative", "demanding", and "attention seeking", are often used and may become a self-fulfilling prophecy, as the negative treatment of these individuals may trigger further self-destructive behavior.

Since BPD can be a stigmatizing diagnosis even within the mental health community, some survivors of childhood abuse who are diagnosed with BPD are re-traumatized by the negative responses they receive from healthcare providers. Certain experts, like Dr. Gillian Proctor and Dr. Karen Williams, argue it would be better to diagnose these people with post-traumatic stress disorder (PTSD), as this would acknowledge the impact of abuse on their behavior, especially given BPD's prevalence in women who have experienced sexual abuse, as well as reduce stigma. Critics of the PTSD diagnosis argue that it medicalizes abuse rather than addressing the root causes in society. Regardless, a diagnosis of PTSD does not encompass all aspects of the disorder (see terminology).

Some clients feel the diagnosis is helpful, allowing them to understand that they are not alone and to connect with others with BPD who have developed helpful coping mechanisms. However, others experience the term "borderline personality disorder" as a pejorative label rather than an informative diagnosis. They report concerns that their self-destructive behavior is incorrectly perceived as manipulative and that the stigma surrounding this disorder limits their access to health care.

==== Physical violence ====
The stigma surrounding borderline personality disorder includes the belief that people with BPD are prone to violence toward others. While movies and visual media often sensationalize people with BPD by portraying them as violent, the majority of researchers agree that people with BPD are unlikely to harm others physically. Although people with BPD often struggle with experiences of intense anger, a defining characteristic of BPD is that they direct it inward toward themselves.

One 2020 study found that BPD is individually associated with psychological, physical, and sexual forms of intimate partner violence (IPV), especially amongst men. In terms of the AMPD trait facets, hostility (negative affectivity), suspiciousness (negative affectivity) and risk-taking (disinhibition) were most strongly associated with IPV perpetration for the total sample.

In addition, adults with BPD have often experienced abuse in childhood, so many people with BPD adopt a "no-tolerance" policy toward expressions of anger of any kind. Their extreme aversion to violence can cause many people with BPD to overcompensate and experience difficulties being assertive and expressing their needs. This is one reason why people with BPD often choose to harm themselves over potentially causing harm to others.

=== Credibility and validity of testimony ===
The credibility of individuals with personality disorders has been questioned at least since the 1960s. Two concerns are the incidence of dissociation episodes among people with BPD and the belief that lying is not uncommon in those diagnosed with the condition.

=== Terminology ===
Because of concerns around stigma, and because of a move away from the original theoretical basis for the term (see history), there is ongoing debate about renaming borderline personality disorder. While some clinicians agree with the current name, others argue that it should be changed, since many who are labelled with borderline personality disorder find the name unhelpful, stigmatizing, or inaccurate.

Alternative suggestions for names include emotional regulation disorder or emotional dysregulation disorder. Impulse disorder and interpersonal regulatory disorder are other valid alternatives, according to John G. Gunderson of McLean Hospital in the United States. Another term suggested by psychiatrist Carolyn Quadrio is post-traumatic personality disorganization (PTPD), reflecting the condition's status as (often) both a form of chronic post-traumatic stress disorder (PTSD) as well as a personality disorder. However, although many with BPD do have traumatic histories, some do not report any traumatic event, which suggests that BPD is not necessarily a trauma spectrum disorder.

The Treatment and Research Advancements National Association for Personality Disorders (TARA-APD) campaigned unsuccessfully to change the name and designation of BPD in DSM-5, published in May 2013, in which the name "borderline personality disorder" remains unchanged, and it is not considered a trauma- and stressor-related disorder.

=== Media ===
In literature, characters believed to exhibit signs of BPD include Catherine in Wuthering Heights (1847), Smerdyakov in The Brothers Karamazov (1880), and Harry Haller in Steppenwolf (1927).

Films have also attempted to portray BPD, with characters in Margot at the Wedding (2007), Mr. Nobody (2009), Cracks (2009), Truth (2013), Wounded (2013), Welcome to Me (2014), and Tamasha (2015) all suggested to show traits of the disorder. The behavior of Theresa Dunn in Looking for Mr. Goodbar (1975) is consistent with BPD, as suggested by Robert O. Friedel. Films like Play Misty for Me (1971) and Girl, Interrupted (1999, based on the memoir of the same name) suggest emotional instability characteristic of BPD, while Single White Female (1992) highlights aspects such as identity disturbance and fear of abandonment. Clementine in Eternal Sunshine of the Spotless Mind (2004) is noted to show classic BPD behavior, and Carey Mulligan's portrayal in Shame (2011) is praised by psychiatrists for its accuracy regarding BPD characteristics.

Television series like Crazy Ex-Girlfriend (2015) and the miniseries Maniac (2018) depict characters with BPD. Traits of BPD and narcissistic personality disorders are observed in characters like Cersei and Jaime Lannister from A Song of Ice and Fire (1996) and its TV adaptation Game of Thrones (2011). In The Sopranos (1999), Livia Soprano is diagnosed with BPD, and even the portrayal of Bruce Wayne/Batman in the show Titans (2018) is said to include aspects of the disorder. The animated series BoJack Horseman (2014) also features a main character with symptoms of BPD.

Star Wars character Anakin Skywalker has been the subject of peer-reviewed papers arguing that he displays symptoms of BPD. A Psychiatry Research article by Eric Bui et al. argued that he displays six of the nine DSM-IV diagnostic criteria for BPD, including impulsivity, violent outbursts and dissociative episodes, illusions of invincibility, and crises of identity. A 2023 article by Lucas de Francisco Carvalho, Fabiano Koich Miguel, and Giselle Pianowski reviewed several more such papers. The authors dispute an alternate diagnosis of bipolar disorder, using Skywalker as an illustrative example for how to distinguish between them in a diagnostic setting.

=== Awareness ===
Awareness of BPD has been growing, with the U.S. House of Representatives declaring May as Borderline Personality Disorder Awareness Month in 2008. Public figures like South Korean singer-songwriter Lee Sun-mi have opened up about their personal experiences with the disorder, bringing further attention to its impact on individuals' lives.

== See also ==
- Classification of personality disorders
- Identity disturbance – Deficiency or inability to maintain one or more major components of identity
- Otto Kernberg – Founder of Transference-Focused Psychotherapy (TFP)

== General bibliography ==
- American Psychiatric Association (2000). Diagnostic and Statistical Manual of Mental Disorders (4th ed.). American Psychiatric Association. ISBN 978-0-89042-025-6.
- American Psychiatric Association (2013). Diagnostic and Statistical Manual of Mental Disorders (5th ed.). American Psychiatric Publishing. ISBN 978-0-89042-555-8.
- Chapman AL, Gratz KL (2007). The Borderline Personality Disorder Survival Guide: Everything You Need to Know About Living with BPD. Oakland, Calif.: New Harbinger Publications. ISBN 978-1-57224-507-5.
- Linehan MM, Comtois KA, Murray AM, Brown MZ, Gallop RJ, Heard HL, et al. (July 2006). "Two-year randomized controlled trial and follow-up of dialectical behavior therapy vs therapy by experts for suicidal behaviors and borderline personality disorder". Archives of General Psychiatry. 63 (7): 757–66. doi:10.1001/archpsyc.63.7.757. PMID 16818865.
- Linehan M (1993). Cognitive-behavioral treatment of borderline personality disorder. New York: Guilford Press. ISBN 978-0-89862-183-9.
- Manning S (2011). Loving Someone with Borderline Personality Disorder. The Guilford Press. ISBN 978-1-59385-607-6.
- Millon T (1996). Disorders of Personality: DSM-IV-TM and Beyond. New York: John Wiley & Sons. ISBN 978-0-471-01186-6.
- Millon T (2004). Personality Disorders in Modern Life. Wiley. ISBN 978-0-471-32355-6.
- Millon T, Grossman S, Meagher SE (2004). Masters of the mind: exploring the story of mental illness from ancient times to the new millennium. John Wiley & Sons. ISBN 978-0-471-46985-8.
- Millon T (2006). "Personality Subtypes". Institute for Advanced Studies in Personology and Psychopathology. Dicandrien, Inc. Archived from the original on 4 November 2010.
