= Persona =

Public image of one's personality

A persona (plural personae or personas) is a strategic mask of identity in public, the public image of one's personality, the social role that one adopts, or simply a fictional character. It is also considered "an intermediary between the individual and the institution."

Persona studies is an academic field developed by communication and media scholars. The related notions of "impression management" and "presentation of self" have been discussed by Erving Goffman in the 1950s.

The word persona derives from Latin, where it originally referred to a theatrical mask. The usage of the word dates back to the beginnings of Latin civilization. The Latin word derived from the Etruscan word "phersu," with the same meaning, and that from the Greek πρόσωπον (prosōpon). It is the etymology of the word "person," or "parson" in French. Latin etymologists explain that persona comes from "per/sonare" as "the mask through which (per) resounds the voice (of the actor)."

Its meaning in the latter Roman period changed to indicate a "character" of a theatrical performance or court of law, when it became apparent that different individuals could assume the same role and that legal attributes such as rights, powers, and duties followed the role. The same individuals as actors could play different roles, each with its own legal attributes, sometimes even in the same court appearance.

== In psychology ==
According to Carl Jung and Jungian psychology, the persona is also the mask or appearance one presents to the world. It may appear in dreams under various guises. People may choose to wear a social mask or use a persona to make themselves appear more socially desirable. This is used to impress potential partners or to make new friends. People can have multiple personas that they use in various situations; this can include work, being with friends, at home, etc. Depending on the individual's circumstance, a persona which they consider stronger within their specific social situation can be created because they put a higher emphasis on social interactions. Jung warned about using personas too much, fearing that one might lose their own individuality to their persona. A study has shown that this can be true to an extent; when taking a private self-rating test, there is a high correlation between how a person rates themselves and how they present themselves in public. It is difficult to tell if people are accurately filling out the test or answering what they find desirable.

In a study written by Danielle Jackson, she argues that a person's persona can range in healthiness. The more healthy a persona is, the more socially acceptable and consistent that person remains. However, once a person starts to believe they are their persona, it can have adverse effects on their personality. James Hillman believed that once a person loses their identity to a persona, they become an archetypal figure. By losing their "ego", their persona becomes their personality in an archetypal form. However, when this occurs, the person becomes unstable and they are unable to act outside their formed persona.

== In literature ==
In literature, the term generally refers to a character established by an author, one in whose voice all or part of a narrative takes place. Poets such as Robert Browning, Ezra Pound, and T. S. Eliot are strongly associated with such narrative voices, as is the writer Luigi Pirandello. These writers understood the term slightly differently and derived its use and meaning from different traditions. Examples of Eliot's personae were "Prufrock" and Sweeney. Pound developed such characters as Cino, Bertran de Born, Propertius, and Mauberley in response to figures in Browning's dramatic monologues. Whereas Eliot used "masks" to distance himself from aspects of modern life which he found degrading and repulsive, Pound's personae were often poets and could be considered in good part alter egos. For Pound, the personae were a way of working through a specific poetic problem. In this sense, the persona is a transparent mask, wearing the traits of two poets and responding to two situations, old and new, which are similar and overlapping.

In literary analysis, any narrative voice that speaks in the first person and appears to define a particular character is often referred to as a persona. It is contrasted with a third-person narrative voice, generally taken to be more objective and impersonal. There are borderline cases, such as the "we" that occurs late in Edwin Arlington Robinson's poem and functions something like a chorus in a Greek tragedy, but in general any identifiable narrator whose point of view or manner of speaking clearly distinguishes them from the author is considered a literary persona.

In fan fiction and in online stories, the personas may especially reflect the authors' self-insertion.

== In music and performing arts ==
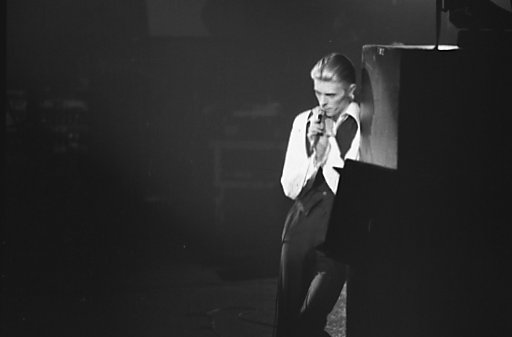
David Bowie as The Thin White Duke at Maple Leaf Gardens, Toronto 1976

=== The concept of musical personae ===
The concept of personae in music was introduced by Edward T. Cone in his The Composer's Voice (1974), which dealt with the relation between the lyrical self of a song's lyrics and its composer. Performance studies scholar Philip Auslander includes further contextual frames, in which musical persona is the primary product of musical performances apart from the original text. Auslander argues that music is a primary social frame as a "principle of organization which govern events." In addition, he categorizes three types of personae transformation: lateral moves within the same frame at a given moment; movements from one frame to another; and within a single frame that changes over time and hypothesizes that personae transformation could only happen when the genre framing changes. As a strategic formation of public identity in communities, musical personae describe how music moves through cultures. Persona maintains stability of performance with the expectation from the audience matching in musical presentation.

The concept of persona can also be used to refer to an instrumentalist, like a pianist and their playing style, although the term is more commonly used to refer to the voice and performance nuances of a vocalist in a studio album or in a live concert. In online spaces where personae are more visible, musical personae can be created through the flexible and fluid virtual bodies of avatars.

Usually, the performers assume a role that matches the music they sing on stage, though they may also be composers. Many performers make use of a persona. Some artists create various characters, especially if their career is long and they go through many changes over time. For example, David Bowie initially adopted a role as alien messenger Ziggy Stardust, and later as The Thin White Duke. More than just artistic pseudonyms, the personae are independent characters used in the artist's shows and albums (in this example, The Rise and Fall of Ziggy Stardust and the Spiders from Mars and Station to Station). However, in music, a persona does not always mean a change. Some authors have noted that Bob Dylan's charisma is due largely to his almost stereotyped image, always with a harmonica, guitar, and with his distinctive hair, nasal voice, and clothing. The persona also serves to claim a right or to draw attention to a certain subject. That is the case of Marilyn Manson and his interest in death and morbidity, and Madonna and her interest in sexuality.

=== Examples ===
==== American artists ====
- Beyoncé: the persona of Beyoncé, "Sasha Fierce", appears on the album I Am... Sasha Fierce. According to Beyoncé, Sasha is her wilder side, emerging during high octane stage performances and serving as a sort of scapegoat for "unladylike" behavior.
- Lady Gaga: Jo Calderone, the persona of Gaga, performed at the 2011 MTV Video Music Awards. Jo represents a drag male persona, and is often used in the performance of her song, "You and I".
- Nicki Minaj: she employs multiple personae, ranging from what she calls the Harajuku Barbie persona to Roman Zolanski, a Polish homosexual. The personae were heavily used in her sophomore album, Pink Friday: Roman Reloaded.

==== British artists ====
- Mick Jagger of the Rolling Stones: he takes the guise of Satan in the song "Sympathy for the Devil" or of a housewife in "Slave"
- Spice Girls: each member of girl group adopted personas based on nicknames given to them by the British press. According to Music Week, these personas ("Ginger", "Posh", "Baby", "Sporty" and "Scary") played a key role in the group's international marketability. Spice Girl Melanie C later said the personas were "like a protection mechanism because it was like putting on this armour of being this, this character, rather than it actually being you."
- The Beatles: they present a group persona of Sgt. Pepper's Lonely Hearts Club Band, including the character Billy Shears "played by" drummer Ringo Starr.

== In marketing and user experience design ==
Personas are used in marketing and advertising by creating a marketing persona that represents a group or segment of customers so that the company can focus its efforts. For example, online advertising agencies can monitor pictures, browsing history and the ads people surfing the internet generally select or choose to click, and based on that data they tailor their merchandise to a targeted audience or better describe a customer segments using a data driven approach.

Personas are also used in user experience design, known as user personas. Alan Cooper introduced personas in his book, The Inmates Are Running the Asylum (1998). Cooper play-acted fictitious characters in order to help solve design questions. These personas need to be based on user research and can also be described in narrative form. Creating personas has become synonymous with creating a document, known as persona profile, instead of an "activity of empathetic role-play".

== See also ==
- Alter ego
- Avatar
- Costume
- Dissociative identity disorder
- Doppelgänger
- Fursona, a term for a furry's persona
- Identity disturbance
- Pen name
- Ponysona, a term for a brony's persona
- Rebirth/Reincarnation
- Pseudonym
- Stage name
- True self and false self
