= Schema therapy =

Form of integrative psychotherapy

Schema therapy is a form of integrative psychotherapy developed by Jeffrey E. Young for use in the treatment of personality disorders and other chronic conditions such as long-term depression, anxiety, and eating disorders. Its basic assumption is that invalid assumptions and mental representations (schemas) hinder one's psychological functioning. Schema therapy aims to challenge and adjust those assumptions.

== Theoretical background ==
Schema therapy is an integrative psychotherapy combining original theoretical concepts and techniques with those from pre-existing models, including cognitive behavioral therapy, attachment theory, Gestalt therapy, constructivism, post-rationalist cognitive therapy, and psychodynamic psychotherapy.

=== Four main theoretical concepts ===
Four main theoretical concepts in schema therapy are early maladaptive schemas (or simply schemas), coping styles, modes, and core emotional needs:

==== Schema ====
In cognitive psychology, a schema is an organized pattern of thought and behavior. It can also be described as a mental structure of preconceived ideas, a framework representing some aspect of the world, or a system of organizing and perceiving new information. In schema therapy, a schema specifically refers to an early maladaptive schema, defined as a pervasive self-defeating or dysfunctional theme or pattern of memories, emotions, and physical sensations, developed during childhood or adolescence and elaborated throughout one's lifetime. Often they have the form of beliefs about the self or the world. For instance, a person with an Abandonment schema could be hypersensitive (have an "emotional button" or "trigger") about their perceived value to others, which in turn could make them feel sad and panicky in their interpersonal relationships.

==== Coping style ====
"Coping styles" are a person's behavioral responses to schemas. There are three potential coping styles:

1. In "avoidance" the person tries to avoid situations that activate the schema.
2. In "surrender" the person gives into the schema, doesn't try to fight against it, and behaves passively in a manner consistent with an expectation that the feared outcome is inevitable.
3. In "counterattack", also called "overcompensation", the person puts extra work into fighting back, hoping to prevent the schema's feared outcome from happening.

These maladaptive coping styles (overcompensation, avoidance, or surrender) very often wind up reinforcing the schemas. Continuing the Abandonment example: having imagined a threat of abandonment in a relationship and feeling sad and panicky, a person using an avoidant coping style might then behave in ways to limit the closeness in the relationship to try to protect him/herself from being abandoned. The resulting loneliness or even actual loss of the relationship could easily reinforce the person's Abandonment schema. Another example can be given for the Defectiveness schema: A person using an avoidant coping style might avoid situations that make them feel defective, or might try to numb the feeling with addictions or distractions. People using a surrender coping style might tolerate unfair criticism without defending themselves. A person using the counterattack/overcompensation coping style might put extra effort into appearing superhuman.

==== Modes ====
"Modes" are states of mind that cluster schemas and coping styles into a temporary "way of being" that a person can shift into occasionally or more frequently. For example, a Vulnerable Child mode might be a state of mind encompassing schemas of Abandonment, Defectiveness, Mistrust/Abuse and a coping style of surrendering (to the schemas).

==== Core emotional needs ====
Some basic emotional needs that have been identified are connection, safety, validation, reciprocity, and autonomy. If a patient's core emotional needs are not met in childhood, then schemas, coping styles, and modes can develop. For example, a child with unmet needs around connection—perhaps due to parental loss to death, divorce, or addiction—might develop an Abandonment schema.

=== Early maladaptive schemas ===
"Early maladaptive schemas" are self-defeating emotional and cognitive patterns established from childhood and repeated throughout life. They may be made up of emotional memories of past hurt, tragedy, fear, abuse, neglect, unmet safety needs, abandonment, or lack of normal human affection in general. Early maladaptive schemas can also include bodily sensations associated with such emotional memories. Early maladaptive schemas can have different levels of severity and pervasiveness: the more severe the schema, the more intense the negative emotion when the schema is triggered and the longer it lasts; the more pervasive the schema, the greater the number of situations that trigger it.

=== Schema domains: groups of early maladaptive schemas ===
"Schema domains" are broad categories of unmet needs into which are grouped 18 early maladaptive schemas identified by Young, Klosko & Weishaar (2003):

1. Disconnection/Rejection includes 5 schemas:
  1. Abandonment/Instability
  2. Mistrust/Abuse
  3. Emotional Deprivation
  4. Defectiveness/Shame
  5. Social Isolation/Alienation
2. Impaired Autonomy and/or Performance includes 4 schemas:
  1. Dependence/Incompetence
  2. Vulnerability to Harm or Illness
  3. Enmeshment/Undeveloped Self
  4. Failure
3. Impaired Limits includes 2 schemas:
  1. Entitlement/Grandiosity
  2. Insufficient Self-Control and/or Self-Discipline
4. Other-Directedness includes 3 schemas:
  1. Subjugation
  2. Self-Sacrifice
  3. Approval-Seeking/Recognition-Seeking
5. Overvigilance/Inhibition includes 4 schemas:
  1. Negativity/Pessimism
  2. Emotional Inhibition
  3. Unrelenting Standards/Hypercriticalness
  4. Punitiveness

Yalcin, Lee & Correia (2020) did a primary and a higher-order factor analysis of data from a large clinical sample and smaller non-clinical population. The higher-order factor analysis indicated four schema domains—Emotional Dysregulation, Disconnection, Impaired Autonomy/Underdeveloped Self, and Excessive Responsibility/Overcontrol—that overlap with the five domains (listed above) proposed earlier by Young, Klosko & Weishaar (2003). The primary factor analysis indicated that the Emotional Inhibition schema could be split into Emotional Constriction and Fear of Losing Control, and the Punitiveness schema could be split into Punitiveness (Self) and Punitiveness (Other).

=== Schema modes ===
"Schema modes" are momentary mind states which every human being experiences at one time or another. A schema mode consists of a cluster of schemas and coping styles. Life situations that a person finds disturbing or offensive, or arouse bad memories, are referred to as "triggers" that tend to activate schema modes. In psychologically healthy persons, schema modes are mild, flexible mind states that are easily pacified by the rest of their personality. In patients with personality disorders, schema modes are more severe, rigid mind states that may seem split off from the rest of their personality.

==== Identified schema modes ====
Young, Klosko & Weishaar (2003) identified 10 schema modes, further described by Jacob, Genderen & Seebauer (2015), and grouped into four categories. The four categories are: Child modes, Dysfunctional Coping modes, Dysfunctional Parent modes, and the Healthy Adult mode. The four Child modes are: Vulnerable Child, Angry Child, Impulsive/Undisciplined Child, and Happy Child. The three Dysfunctional Coping modes are: Compliant Surrenderer, Detached Protector, and Overcompensator. The two Dysfunctional Parent modes are: Punitive Parent and Demanding Parent.

- Vulnerable Child is the mode in which a patient may feel defective in some way, thrown aside, unloved, obviously alone, or may be in a "me against the world" mindset. The patient may feel as though peers, friends, family, and even the entire world have abandoned them. Behaviors of patients in Vulnerable Child mode may include (but are not limited to) falling into major depression, pessimism, feeling unwanted, feeling unworthy of love, and perceiving personality traits as irredeemable flaws. Rarely, a patient's self-perceived flaws may be intentionally withheld on the inside; when this occurs, instead of showing one's true self, the patient may appear to others as "egotistical", "attention-seeking", selfish, distant, and may exhibit behaviors unlike their true nature. The patient might create a narcissistic alter-ego/persona in order to escape or hide the insecurity from others. Due to fear of rejection, of feeling disconnected from their true self and poor self-image, these patients, who truly desire companionship/affection, may instead end up pushing others away.
- Angry Child is fueled mainly by feelings of victimization or bitterness, leading towards negativity, pessimism, jealousy, and rage. While experiencing this schema mode, a patient may have urges to yell, scream, throw/break things, or possibly even injure themself or harm others. The Angry Child schema mode is enraged, anxious, frustrated, self-doubting, feels unsupported in ideas and vulnerable.
- Impulsive Child is the mode where anything goes. Behaviors of the Impulsive Child schema mode may include reckless driving, substance abuse, cutting oneself, suicidal thoughts, gambling, or fits of rage, such as punching a wall when "triggered" or laying blame of circumstantial difficulties upon innocent people. Unsafe sex, rash decisions to run away from a situation without resolution, tantrums perceived by peers as infantile, and so forth are a mere few of the behaviors which a patient in this schema mode might display. Impulsive Child is the rebellious and careless schema mode.
- Happy Child occurs when one feels like their needs are being met. When people experience the Happy Child mode, they feel safe, loved, and content. They experience a joyful sense of wonder and playfulness about the world. This mode is healthy as it represents the absence of activation of maladaptive schemas. While healthy adults spend most of their time in the Healthy Adult mode, they also cultivate their Happy Child to balance the demands of life with a sense of lightheartedness.
- Compliant Surrenderer is a coping mode where one experiences the schema that triggered it as true. This in turn leads to feelings such as helplessness, sadness, guilt, or anger about the situation. People in this mode often believe it is pointless to challenge their schema, and that it must simply be accepted. They also often adopt an interpersonally passive and dependent style, seeking to please people in their lives, to minimize conflict, and therefore avoid further harm or abuse.
- Detached Protector is based in escape. Patients in Detached Protector schema mode withdraw, dissociate, alienate, or hide in some way. This may be triggered by numerous stress factors or feelings of being overwhelmed. When a patient with insufficient skills is in a situation involving excessive demands, it can trigger a Detached Protector response mode. Stated simply, patients become numb in order to protect themselves from the harm or stress of what they fear is to come, or to protect themselves from fear of the unknown in general.
- Overcompensator is marked by attempts to fight off schemas in a way that is rigid and extreme. It often involves aggressiveness, rebelliousness, violating the rights of other people, and an attempt to dominate them. In this mode, a person who feels emotionally deprived demands affection from others, while a person who believes others cannot be trusted will try to preemptively hurt them before they do. It may also involve obsessiveness in an excessive attempt to control the environment, or forced behaviors, such as extreme forgiveness for someone with a Punitiveness schema.
- Punitive Parent is identified by beliefs of a patient that they should be harshly punished, perhaps due to feeling "defective", or making a simple mistake. The patient may feel that they should be punished for even existing. Sadness, anger, impatience, and judgment are directed to the patient and from the patient. The Punitive Parent has great difficulty in forgiving themself even under average circumstances in which anyone could fall short of their standards. The Punitive Parent does not wish to allow for human error or imperfection, thus punishment is what this mode seeks.
- Demanding Parent is associated with a strong sense of pressure to achieve. When experiencing this mode, people often feel like their performance is inadequate, no matter how well they do or how much effort they make. Common beliefs also involve the idea that rest, fun, and relaxation are not acceptable and that one's attention should remain focused on achieving more. While this mode is often accompanied by Punitive Parent, this is not always the case. Clients with the Demanding Parent mode feel pressure and dissatisfaction with their achievements, but not necessarily guilt, shame or feelings of worthlessness.
- Healthy Adult is the mode that schema therapy aims to help a patient achieve as the long-lasting state of well-being. The Healthy Adult is comfortable making decisions, is a problem-solver, thinks before acting, is appropriately ambitious, sets limits and boundaries, nurtures self and others, forms healthy relationships, takes on all responsibility, sees things through, and enjoys/partakes in enjoyable adult activities and interests with boundaries enforced, takes care of their physical health, and values themself. In this schema mode the patient focuses on the present day with hope and strives toward the best tomorrow possible. The Healthy Adult forgives the past, no longer sees themself as a victim (but as a survivor), and expresses all emotions in ways which are healthy and cause no harm.

== Aims and applications ==
The goal of schema therapy is to help patients meet their basic emotional needs by helping the patient learn how to:

- heal schemas by diminishing the intensity of emotional memories comprising the schema and the intensity of bodily sensations, and by changing the cognitive patterns connected to the schema;
- replace maladaptive coping styles and responses with adaptive patterns of behavior.

Schema therapy is often utilized when patients relapse or fail to respond after having been through other therapies (for example, traditional cognitive behavioral therapy). Schema therapy has also been adapted for use in forensic settings, complex trauma and PTSD, and with children and adolescents.

== Techniques in schema therapy ==
Techniques used in schema therapy including limited reparenting and Gestalt therapy psychodrama techniques such as imagery re-scripting and empty chair dialogues.

Treatment plans in schema therapy generally encompass three basic classes of techniques: cognitive, experiential, and behavioral (in addition to the basic healing components of the therapeutic relationship). Cognitive strategies expand on standard cognitive behavioral therapy techniques such as listing pros and cons of a schema, testing the validity of a schema, or conducting a dialogue between the "schema side" and the "healthy side". Experiential and emotion focused strategies expand on standard Gestalt therapy psychodrama and imagery techniques. Behavioral pattern-breaking strategies expand on standard behavior therapy techniques, such as role playing an interaction and then assigning the interaction as homework. One of the most central techniques in schema therapy is the use of the therapeutic relationship, specifically through a process called "limited reparenting".

Specific techniques often used in schema therapy include flash cards with important therapeutic messages, created in session and used by the patient between sessions, and the schema diary—a template or workbook that is filled out by the patient between sessions and that records the patient's progress in relation to all the theoretical concepts in schema therapy.

== Schema therapy and psychoanalysis ==
From an integrative psychotherapy perspective, limited reparenting and the experiential techniques, particularly around changing modes, could be seen as actively changing what psychoanalysis has described as object relations. Historically, mainstream psychoanalysis tended to reject active techniques—such as Fritz Perls' Gestalt therapy work or Franz Alexander's "corrective emotional experience"—but contemporary relational psychoanalysis (led by analysts such as Lewis Aron, and building on the ideas of earlier unorthodox analysts such as Sándor Ferenczi) is more open to active techniques. It is notable that in a head-to-head comparison of a psychoanalytic object relations treatment (Otto F. Kernberg's transference focused psychotherapy) and schema therapy, the latter has been demonstrated to be more effective in treating Borderline Personality Disorder.

== Outcome studies on schema therapy ==
=== Schema therapy vs transference focused psychotherapy outcomes ===
Dutch investigators, including Josephine Giesen-Bloo and Arnoud Arntz (the project leader), compared schema therapy (also known as schema focused therapy or SFT) with transference focused psychotherapy (TFP) in the treatment of borderline personality disorder. 86 patients were recruited from four mental health institutes in the Netherlands. Patients in the study received two sessions per week of SFT or TFP for three years. After three years, full recovery was achieved in 45% of the patients in the SFT condition, and in 24% of those receiving TFP. One year later, the percentage fully recovered increased to 52% in the SFT condition and 29% in the TFP condition, with 70% of the patients in the SFT group achieving "clinically significant and relevant improvement". Moreover, the dropout rate was only 27% for SFT, compared with 50% for TFP.

Patients began to feel and function significantly better after the first year, with improvement occurring more rapidly in the SFT group. There was continuing improvement in subsequent years. Thus investigators concluded that both treatments had positive effects, with schema therapy clearly more successful.

=== Less intensive outpatient, individual schema therapy ===
Dutch investigators, including Marjon Nadort and Arnoud Arntz, assessed the effectiveness of schema therapy in the treatment of borderline personality disorder when utilized in regular mental health care settings. A total of 62 patients were treated in eight mental health centers located in the Netherlands. The treatment was less intensive along a number of dimensions including a shift from twice weekly to once weekly sessions during the second year. Despite this, there was no lessening of effectiveness with recovery rates that were at least as high and similarly low dropout rates.

=== Pilot study of group schema therapy for borderline personality disorder ===
Investigators Joan Farrell, Ida Shaw and Michael Webber at the Indiana University School of Medicine Center for BPD Treatment & Research tested the effectiveness of adding an eight-month, 30-session schema therapy group to treatment-as-usual (TAU) for borderline personality disorder (BPD) with 32 patients. The dropout rate was 0% for those patients who received group schema therapy in addition to TAU and 25% for those who received TAU alone. At the end of treatment, 94% of the patients who received group schema therapy in addition to TAU compared to 16% of the patients receiving TAU alone no longer met BPD diagnostic criteria. The schema therapy group treatment led to significant reductions in symptoms and global improvement in functioning. The large positive treatment effects found in the group schema therapy study suggest that the group modality may augment or catalyze the active ingredients of the treatment for BPD patients. As of 2014, a collaborative randomized controlled trial is under way at 14 sites in six countries to further explore this interaction between groups and schema therapy.

== See also ==
- List of maladaptive schemas
- Jeffrey E. Young
- Borderline personality disorder
- Cognitive therapy
- Dynamic-maturational model of attachment and adaptation
- Personal construct theory
- Schema (psychology)
