= Paulina Kernberg =

Chilean-American child psychiatrist and psychoanalyst (1935–2006)

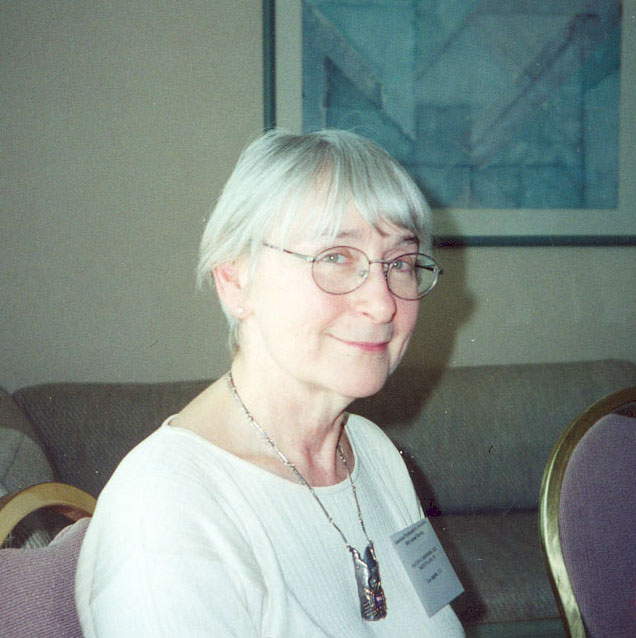
- Born: January 10, 1935; Santiago, Chile
- Died: April 12, 2006 (aged 71); New York City, New York, U.S.

Academic background
- Education: University of Chile (BS, MD)

Academic work
- Discipline: Psychiatry, Psychoanalysis
- Institutions: Weill Cornell Medicine; Columbia University; Menninger Clinic

Paulina F. Kernberg (January 10, 1935 – April 12, 2006) was a Chilean-American child psychiatrist, child and adolescent psychoanalyst, professor of psychiatry at Weill Cornell Medicine, and consultant to the Clinton administration. She was internationally recognized for her research on personality disorders in children and adolescents, her pioneering use of play and mirror-based interviews, and her studies on divorce.

== Early life and education ==
Kernberg was born in Santiago, Chile, to Isaac and Rebecca (nee Ostray) Fischer, who had European Jewish attachments. She studied at the University of Chile, where she earned both a Bachelor of Science degree and a Doctor of Medicine. She also furthered her practice through several Kansas based hospitals including Menninger Memorial Hospital in Topeka. She later married Otto F. Kernberg, a psychoanalyst and professor of psychiatry, with whom she shared a long-standing professional collaboration.

== Career ==
After medical school, Kernberg trained in psychiatry at the Menninger Clinic in Topeka, Kansas. She became a U.S. citizen in 1968 and entered psychoanalytic training at the Topeka Institute for Psychoanalysis.

From 1978 until her death, Kernberg was Director of the Residency Program in Child and Adolescent Psychiatry at Payne Whitney Westchester–Weill Cornell Medical Center. She also taught and supervised at the Columbia University Center for Psychoanalytic Training and Research, where she was a training and supervising analyst in both adult and child psychoanalysis.

According to the New York Times, Kernberg’s clinical style was “gentle but rigorous,” and she was especially known for helping children articulate feelings they struggled to express. Her work “demonstrated that personality disorders could be traced to early developmental struggles” and emphasized early treatment as both possible and necessary.

== Research on play therapy ==
Kernberg argued that recurring patterns of play, what she called The Forms of Play, could be used as structured diagnostic tools, providing insight into personality integration, object relations, and defensive operations in childhood.

=== Classification of The Forms of Play ===
In her clinical research, Kernberg, often in collaboration with Lina Normandin, proposed that children’s play could be systematically classified into distinct forms, each with diagnostic and developmental significance.

Form of play	Description	Clinical significance
Functional / sensorimotor play	Simple, repetitive use of objects (e.g., banging, rolling, stacking)	Typical in early childhood; persistence beyond expected age may indicate developmental delay
Constructive play	Building, organizing, drawing, assembling with a goal	Reflects problem-solving and cognitive growth; disruptions may signal anxiety or learning problems
Symbolic / pretend play	Using toys or figures to represent people or roles	Demonstrates symbolic capacity; rigid or stereotyped play may suggest trauma or conflict
Thematic play	Organized stories with characters, plots, and roles	Indicates higher integration of fantasy and reality; reveals relational patterns and defenses
Repetitive / traumatic play	Re-enactment of stressful or traumatic events, often rigidly repeated	Associated with unresolved trauma, separation, or family conflict
Aggressive / destructive play	Themes of attack, destruction, or pervasive violence	May reflect normal aggression; excessive patterns can suggest impulse or personality difficulties
Regressive play	Primitive or chaotic play not expected for developmental age	May indicate severe anxiety, psychotic processes, or early personality disorganization
Interactive / cooperative play	Reciprocal play with peers or adults	Reflects socialization, empathy, and capacity for object relations

== Mirror-based assessment and self-concept ==
Kernberg pioneered the use of the mirror interview, in which a mother and child, or adolescents alone, interacted in front of a mirror. These interviews provided unique insight into the child’s self-concept, processes of identification, and capacity to integrate self- and object-representations.

=== Mirror Interview Method ===
Kernberg developed the Mirror Interview as a structured diagnostic tool for assessing self-concept and personality organization in children and adolescents.

The technique was designed to make observable the child’s processes of self-representation, identification, and differentiation. Kernberg argued that the mirror context elicits behaviors that reveal levels of personality integration, defensive operations, and quality of object relations.

Subsequent studies applied the Mirror Interview to the evaluation of adolescents at risk for personality disorders, using standardized rating scales to capture patterns of relatedness, affect regulation, and symbolic functioning.

Kernberg’s work on the Mirror Interview reinforced her broader view that systematic, observable methods could bridge psychoanalytic theory and empirical child psychiatry.

== Use of videotape in psychotherapy research ==
Kernberg employed videotape recordings to study both the child and therapist during diagnostic and therapeutic encounters. Careful review of videotaped sessions, combined with structured observational tools, allowed her to explicate subtle affective exchanges, nonverbal cues, and regulatory mechanisms in the therapeutic dyad.

== Mother–child relationship and cultural portrayals ==
Kernberg examined the symbolic representation of the mother–child relationship in religious and cultural history. She analyzed depictions such as the Madonna and Child as expressions of universal attachment themes, using these portrayals to deepen psychoanalytic understanding of maternal bonds and their cultural resonance, reflecting the artists' early bonds with their own mothers.

== Work on divorce ==
Kernberg was among the first child psychiatrists to study the psychological consequences of divorce on children. She concluded that children frequently experienced divorce as second only to parental death in traumatic impact. Based on these findings, she helped establish one of the first clinical programs for children of divorced families at NewYork-Presbyterian Hospital.

== Narcissism and severe personality disorders in children ==
Building on the psychoanalytic theories of Otto F. Kernberg, Paulina Kernberg studied the early manifestations of narcissism and personality disorders in children and adolescents. She emphasized that pathological narcissism and borderline pathology could be identified in childhood through systematic assessment of defenses, affect regulation, and relational patterns.

== Elián González case ==
In 2000, the United States Department of Justice asked Paulina Kernberg to evaluate Elián González, the Cuban boy at the center of an international custody battle. She assessed González’s psychological state and concluded that reunification with his father was essential for his long-term psychological well-being.

As a consultant to the Clinton administration, Kernberg recommended child-centered strategies to help González reconnect with his father within their cultural Cuban context. Her conclusions generated controversy: while some critics alleged political influence, professional colleagues defended her reliance on developmental and psychoanalytic principles.

== Work on defense mechanisms ==
Based on the work of George E. Vaillant on adult development and defenses, Paulina Kernberg contributed to the understanding of defense mechanisms in children. In her chapter “Mechanisms of Defense” in the Comprehensive Textbook of Psychiatry (Kaplan & Sadock, 6th ed.), she outlined the developmental hierarchy of defenses, from primitive mechanisms such as denial, splitting, and projection to more mature defenses such as repression, intellectualization, and sublimation.

=== Defense mechanisms as observed in play ===
In her chapter on defense mechanisms in the Comprehensive Textbook of Psychiatry (Kaplan & Sadock, 6th ed., 1995), Kernberg emphasized that defenses in children could be identified not only through verbal report but also through systematic observation of play. She argued that play provides a unique window into personality organization, since themes and storylines often reflect the child’s unconscious defenses.

Defense mechanism	Observable play theme	Clinical significance
Denial	Child ignores frightening or sad scenarios; abruptly shifts play topic	Avoidance of anxiety; persistence indicates immature coping
Projection	Aggressive impulses attributed to toys or figures (“the bad doll did it”)	Externalization of unwanted affects; common in disruptive behaviors
Splitting	Play characters divided rigidly into “all good” versus “all bad”	Marker of primitive object relations; typical in borderline pathology
Acting out	Impulsive, destructive play without symbolic elaboration	Direct expression of drive derivatives; suggests impulse-control difficulties
Repression	Absence of expected themes (e.g., family, separation) despite known stressors	Exclusion of painful content from play narratives
Intellectualization	Child offers abstract or overly detailed explanations during play	Reliance on thought to master conflict; observed in anxious/obsessive children
Humor	Use of jokes or playful exaggeration in role scenarios	Adaptive channeling of conflict; considered a mature defense
Sublimation	Aggressive energy transformed into constructive play (e.g., building, drawing)	Reflects higher ego integration and resilience

Kernberg’s framework linked observable play behavior with the developmental hierarchy of defenses, providing clinicians with a structured method for assessing personality organization in children.

== Publications ==
Kernberg authored or co-authored more than 100 publications, including articles, chapters, and books. Selected works include:

- Kernberg, P. F. (1980). “Use of videotape in child psychiatry research and training.” Journal of the American Academy of Child Psychiatry, 19(4): 722–736.
- Kernberg, P. F. (1985). “Reflections on maternal imagery in religion and art.” International Journal of Psychoanalysis, 66: 247–261.
- Kernberg, P. F. (1990). Personality Disorders in Children and Adolescents. New York: Basic Books. ISBN 9780465051471.
- Kernberg, P. F. (1992). “Childhood precursors of personality disorders.” Journal of the American Academy of Child & Adolescent Psychiatry, 31(3): 391–397. doi:10.1097/00004583-199205000-00005
- Kernberg, P. F., & Normandin, L. (1994). Clinical Studies of Play and Personality Organization. London: Karnac. ISBN 9781855750662.
- Kernberg, P. F. (1995). “Mechanisms of Defense.” In H. Kaplan & B. Sadock (eds.), Comprehensive Textbook of Psychiatry, 6th ed., pp. 134–141. Baltimore: Williams & Wilkins.
- Kernberg, P. F. (1996). “Play in clinical assessment and treatment.” Child and Adolescent Psychiatric Clinics of North America, 5(3): 623–638.
- Kernberg, P. F. (1998). The Mirror Interview: A Diagnostic Tool for Assessing Personality Organization in Children and Adolescents. Hillsdale, NJ: Analytic Press. ISBN 9780881632939.
- Kernberg, P. F. (2000). “The impact of divorce on children.” Child Psychiatry and Human Development, 31(1): 3–14.

== Teaching and influence ==
An awardee of the 2006 APM George E. Daniels Merit Award, Kernberg lectured internationally in English, Spanish, and French, and was regarded as an outstanding teacher and supervisor. She received numerous honors and trained generations of child psychiatrists and psychoanalysts, integrating psychoanalytic theory with empirical research.

== Legacy ==
Kernberg’s work had lasting influence on child psychiatry and psychoanalysis. She was among the first to argue that personality disorders could be reliably identified in children and adolescents, shaping later research on early diagnosis and treatment. Her structured play and mirror interviews remain important tools in clinical training, and her integration of psychoanalytic concepts with empirical methods helped bridge gaps between psychodynamic and academic psychiatry.

The New York Times obituary noted that her insights “profoundly influenced how clinicians understand divorce, personality disorders, and the role of play in diagnosis and treatment.” Scholars have since cited her as a pioneer in linking psychoanalytic theory with developmental psychiatry, and her research continues to be referenced in contemporary studies of child and adolescent personality pathology.

== Personal life ==
Kernberg was married to Otto F. Kernberg, a psychoanalyst, until her death. She died of cancer in New York City on April 12, 2006, at the age of 71.

== See also ==
- Otto F. Kernberg
- Play therapy
- Defense mechanism
- Personality disorder
- Child psychoanalysis
