= Dynamic deconstructive psychotherapy =

Dynamic deconstructive psychotherapy (DDP) is a manual-based treatment for borderline personality disorder.

== Goals ==
The goals of DDP are: (1) connecting with one's own emotional experiences in order to develop an integrated sense of self and (2) connecting with others in more authentic ways, so as to improve the quality of relationships.

== Focus of treatment ==
The primary focus of treatment is on recent social interactions. Three sets of techniques are employed: Association, Attribution, and Alterity. With Association techniques, the therapist helps the client to develop a narrative sequence of a given interaction and to identify emotions that the client may have experienced. With Attribution techniques, the therapist helps the client to examine alternative ways to interpret the interaction, thereby deconstructing rigid, polarized attributions towards self and other, and opening up new and more complex perspectives. With Alterity techniques, the therapist provides deconstructive experiences within the therapist-client relationship that support individuation and help to experientially deconstruct rigid, polarized attributions.

== Treatment procedure ==
DDP is offered on a weekly basis in 45-50 minute sessions. Between sessions, clients are encouraged to work on connecting to their emotional experiences using Daily Connection Sheets, and to attempt to develop more authentic and individuated relationships outside of treatment.

DDP is a time-limited treatment proceeding through four sequential stages with the duration pre-determined to be 12 months. The expectation is not that the client will be cured within 12 months, but that the client will be sufficiently recovered to move out of intensive mental health treatment. For patients who are not ready for this step at the end of 12 months, monthly maintenance sessions or 6-month blocks of weekly booster sessions are made available.

== Mechanisms of change ==
Neuroscience research suggests that individuals with borderline personality disorder process emotional experiences through aberrant neural pathways in the brain. They are less likely to use pathways involving higher-level cortical regions responsible for episodic memory, integration, verbalization, mood regulation, and perspective-taking. Instead, they are likely to activate more primitive neural pathways in the limbic region of the brain responsible for anxiety, fear responses, and impulsivity It is also established in neuroscience research that the simple act of identifying and labeling emotions can reduce activation of the limbic system and reduce physiological arousal.

By repeatedly recounting recent social interactions, identifying emotions, and putting them into perspective, DDP is hypothesized to activate higher-level cortical pathways, thereby strengthening them and remediating deficits in how emotions are processed in the brain. The analogy used is to physical therapy following stroke; physical therapy repeatedly activates motor neuron pathways in the brain, thereby strengthening them and restoring control over muscle functioning and voluntary movement.

== Efficacy ==
In separate studies, DDP has been shown to improve symptoms of borderline personality disorder (BPD), depression, and dissociation, to decrease use of hospitalization, to lessen maladaptive behaviors, such as suicide attempts, self-harm, and substance misuse, and to improve functioning. In a small, randomized controlled trial of DDP for co-occurring BPD and alcohol use disorder, clients receiving DDP achieved significantly greater improvement in symptoms of BPD, depression, and social functioning than clients receiving community-based treatment of equal intensity. 90% of clients who completed 12 months of DDP achieved a clinically meaningful change in symptoms of BPD. Most participants continued to improve after treatment with DDP ended, with significant improvement noted in parasuicide behavior, heavy drinking and recreational drug use. A study examining mechanisms of change indicated that therapist adherence to DDP techniques strongly predicted symptom improvement, thus suggesting specific therapeutic efficacy for DDP techniques.

A case series of clients with co-occurring BPD and dissociative identity disorder indicated that DDP was associated with marked improvement in dissociative symptoms over 12 months.

An observational study comparing naturalistic outcomes of DDP and dialectical behavior therapy (DBT) in treatment refractory clients seen at a medical university clinic indicated significantly better improvement for clients treated with DDP than DBT across a broad range of outcomes, including symptoms of BPD, depression, disability, and self-harm. After an independent review by the U.S. government's Substance Abuse and Mental Health Services Administration (SAMHSA), DDP was included on its (now defunct) National Registry of Evidence-based Programs and Practices (NREPP) (see www.nrepp.samhsa.gov).
