= List of maladaptive schemas =

List on psychotherapy topic

This is a list of maladaptive schemas, often called early maladaptive schemas, in schema therapy, a theory and method of psychotherapy. An early maladaptive schema is a pervasive self-defeating or dysfunctional theme or pattern of memories, emotions, and physical sensations, developed during childhood or adolescence and elaborated throughout one's lifetime, that often has the form of a belief about the self or the world. The headings under which the schemas are categorized below are known as schema domains.

== Disconnection and rejection ==
Abandonment/instability
The belief system involving the sense that significant others will not be able to continue providing support, connection, strength, or protection because they are unstable, unpredictable, unreliable; because they will eventually die; or because they found someone better.

Mistrust/abuse
The belief system involving the sense that others will intentionally hurt, abuse, humiliate, cheat, lie, manipulate, take advantage, or neglect.

Emotional deprivation
The belief that one's standard for emotional support will not be met by others.

Defectiveness/shame
The belief that one is defective, bad, unwanted, inferior, or unworthy. This includes the fear of insecurities being exposed to significant others, accompanied by hypersensitivity to criticism, rejection, and blame.

Social isolation/alienation
The belief that one is isolated from other people; the feeling of not being a part of any groups.

== Impaired autonomy and performance ==
Dependence/incompetence
The belief that one cannot handle daily responsibilities without the help of others.

Vulnerability to harm or illness
The belief system involving the exaggeration of fear that catastrophe will strike at any time; the catastrophes may be medical, emotional, or external.

Enmeshment/underdeveloped self
The belief system that one must please others at the expense of self or social development.

Failure
The belief that one will fail in everything.

== Impaired limits ==
Entitlement/grandiosity
The belief that one is superior to others, which allows one to have special rights and privileges.

Insufficient self-control/self-discipline
The conflict between life goals and low self control, perhaps seeking comfort instead of trying to perform daily responsibilities.

== Other-directedness ==
Subjugation
The belief that one should surrender control to others, suppressing desires in order to avoid anger, retaliation, or abandonment.

Self-sacrifice
The belief system involving excessive selflessness, focused on meeting the needs of others at the expense of one's own desire.

Approval-seeking/recognition-seeking
The desire to gain approval, recognition, or attention from other people at the expense of developing a secure and true sense of self.

== Overvigilance and inhibition ==
Negativity/pessimism
The belief system involving the overemphasis on the negative aspects of life including pain, death, loss, disappointment, conflict, guilt, resentment, unsolved problems, potential mistakes, betrayal, or things that could go wrong; neglecting positive aspects of life.

Overcontrol/emotional inhibition
The belief system involving the inhibition of actions, feelings, or communications to avoid negative consequences.

Unrelenting standards/hypercriticalness
The belief that one must strive to meet very high personal standards, usually to avoid criticism, leading to hypercriticalness toward self and/or others.

Punitiveness
The belief that people should face consequences for their mistakes.

== Other versions ==
Yalcin, Lee & Correia (2020) did a primary and a higher-order factor analysis of data from a large clinical sample and smaller non-clinical population. The higher-order factor analysis indicated four schema domains—emotional dysregulation, disconnection, impaired autonomy/underdeveloped self, and excessive responsibility/overcontrol—that overlap with the five domains (listed above) proposed earlier by Young, Klosko & Weishaar (2003). The primary factor analysis indicated that the emotional inhibition schema could be split into emotional constriction and fear of losing control, and the punitiveness schema could be split into punitiveness (self) and punitiveness (other).

== See also ==
- Defence mechanism – Unconscious psychological mechanism
- List of cognitive biases
- List of memory biases
- Logic-based therapy § Higher order premises
- Motivated reasoning – Using emotionally-biased reasoning to produce justifications or make decisions
- Post-rationalist cognitive therapy § Personal meaning organizations
- Primal world beliefs – Beliefs about the general character of the world
