= Identity disturbance =

Deficiency or inability to maintain one or more major components of identity

An identity disturbance or identity diffusion is an inability to maintain major components of identity. It refers to the fragmentation of one's self-image.

In the DSM-5, identity disturbance is defined as a distinctly and persistently unstable self-image or sense of self. It is a core symptom of borderline personality disorder and can manifest as dramatic changes in goals, values, aspirations, and self-perception. It is also included in the category of Other Specified Dissociative Disorder (OSDD) in cases where the disorder results from long-term and intense coercive influence.

A person suffering from an identity disturbance may adopt the personality traits of those around them, as they struggle with their own identity. They may confuse their own characteristics, emotions, and desires with those of another person. In the 1930s, psychoanalyst Helene Deutsch described the "as if" personality, in which an individual's identity appears superficially intact but lacks authenticity and depth. Such a person imitates the emotions and identities of others to conceal an inner emptiness.

== Characteristics ==
An identity disturbance is characterized by a deficiency or inability to maintain one or more of the following major components of identity:

- a sense of continuity over time;
- emotional commitment to representations of self, role relationships, core values and self-standards;
- development of a meaningful world view;
- recognition of one's place in the world.

Emotional dysregulation is associated with identity disturbance in psychiatric patients. This association also remains when borderline personality disorder (BPD) diagnosis, depression, and anxiety are taken into account as additional factors. Although some researchers posit that it is the lack of consistent goals, values, world views, and relationships that lead to a sense of emptiness, it is not entirely clear whether the link between emotional dysregulation and identity disturbance is because a disturbed identity creates a negative affect that is hard to regulate, because emotional dysregulation disturbs identity, because a third variable causes both (confounding), or some combination of the above.

== Correlation with BPD ==
Identity diffusion is a core feature of borderline personality disorder, characterized by a persistently unstable self-image and sense of self. Research has shown that identity disturbance in borderline patients is an important indicator of symptom severity and interpersonal difficulties, and that it also correlates with emotional dysregulation.

Otto Kernberg observed identity diffusion in all severe personality disorders. Depending on the type of disorder, the individual may be unable to form a coherent image of themselves and/or others. Kernberg builds on Erik H. Erikson's concept of identity and identity diffusion as opposite poles of successful and failed identity formation, and further develops this idea from the perspective of object relations theory.

There are many theories about why borderline personality disorder often includes identity disturbances. One is that patients with BPD inhibit emotions, which causes numbness and emptiness. Another theory is that patients with BPD identify fully with the affective state of each moment, leaping from one moment to the next without the continuity of a narrative identity. Meeting criteria for major depressive disorder predicts identity disturbance in BPD patients, and identity disturbance is also correlated with a heightened risk for substance use disorders and high anxiety in adolescents. The syndrome of identity disturbance is encountered in all personality disorder types.

== Neural substrate ==
To understand the development of self-identity, researchers investigating the neural basis of self have examined the neural systems involved in distinguishing one's own thoughts and actions from the thoughts and actions of others.

One critical system implicated in this line of research involves the cortical midline structures (CMS), which include the orbital and medial prefrontal cortex, the anterior cingulate cortex, dorsomedial prefrontal cortex, and the posterior cingulate cortex including the adjacent precuneus (see insert). Greater activation in these structures has been found when people made trait judgements about themselves as opposed to others, as well as during a resting state (see Default mode network) or self-referential activity compared to when involved in a non-self-referential task. In addition to this correlational evidence linking these regions to our self-identity, one study using transcranial magnetic stimulation to transiently disturb neural activity in the medial parietal region of cortex found that this disruption led to a decreased ability to retrieve previous judgements of oneself compared to the retrieval of previous judgements of others.

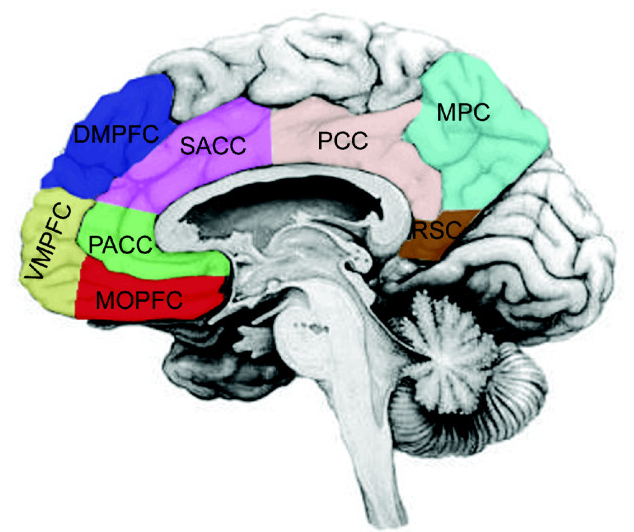
Regions of the brain collectively known as the cortical midline structures. Scientific data suggest the CMS play a vital role in emotional and identity self-regulation.

Based on evidence from neuroimaging studies in clinical populations, it seems that both high activity in CMS regions during resting state and self-referential activities, accompanied by deactivation of this region during non-self-referential tasks, are critical for forming a stable and unified identity. More pronounced identity disturbance seems to be facilitated by poorer deactivation of CMS during task-related activities. Activity has also been shown to be lower in the dorsal portion of the precuneus for people believed to have identity disturbance compared to controls during the evaluation of self-attributes.

Moreover, researchers comparing resting-state fMRI scans of people with BPD and healthy controls have found reduced functional connectivity in the retrosplenial cortex and the superior frontal gyrus.

Mindfulness training, a core skill in dialectical behavior therapy used in the treatment of BPD, has been linked with alterations in default mode network activity.

== See also ==
- Narcissistic personality disorder
- True self and false self
