= Otto F. Kernberg =

Founder of Transference-Focused Psychotherapy (TFP)

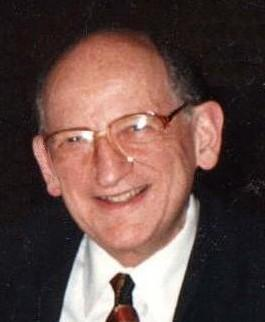
- Born: Otto Friedmann Kernberg; 10 September 1928 (age 98); Vienna, Austria
- Known for: Psychoanalytic theories on borderline personality organization and narcissistic pathology
- Scientific career
- Fields: Psychoanalysis and severe personality disorders
- Workplaces: Columbia University; Weill Cornell Medical College; NewYork-Presbyterian Hospital; University of Chile

Otto Friedmann Kernberg (Austrian German: [ˈkɛrnbɛrg]; born 10 September 1928) is an Austrian-born American psychoanalyst and professor of psychiatry at Weill Cornell Medicine, known for developing transference-focused psychotherapy (TFP). He is recognized internationally for his contributions to the psychoanalytic theories on borderline personality organization and narcissistic pathology.

== Early life and education ==
Kernberg was born in Vienna to Jewish parents, Leon and Sonia Paula (Friedmann) Kernberg.

In 1939, when he was 11, his family had to flee Austria to Chile after the Nazi Party annexed the country to Germany. Kernberg had been expelled from his school, and it had been made clear to him and other Jewish children that they did not belong in their school due to their ethnicity and religion.

Kernberg studied biology and medicine at the University of Chile. He trained in psychiatry in Chile, and in psychoanalysis at the Chilean Psychoanalytic Society.

== Career ==
In 1959, Kernberg moved to the United States on a Rockefeller Foundation fellowship to study psychotherapy research with Jerome Frank at Johns Hopkins Hospital. He then joined the Menninger Clinic in Topeka, Kansas, where he directed the Psychotherapy Research Project and served as Supervising and Training Analyst at the Topeka Institute for Psychoanalysis.

In 1973 he became Director of the General Clinical Service at the New York State Psychiatric Institute. The following year he was appointed Professor of Clinical Psychiatry at Columbia University and Training and Supervising Analyst at the Columbia University Center for Psychoanalytic Training and Research. In 1976 he joined Cornell University as Professor of Psychiatry and Director of the Institute for Personality Disorders at the New York Hospital–Cornell Medical Center. From 1997 to 2001 he served as President of the International Psychoanalytical Association (IPA). On his 97th birthday, September 10, 2025, he was named Honorary President of the IPA.

== Transference-focused psychotherapy ==
Kernberg developed transference-focused psychotherapy (TFP), a structured form of psychodynamic treatment for borderline personality organization (BPO) and related conditions. TFP is based on object relations theory and emphasizes the interpretation of split and contradictory self- and object-representations as they emerge in the therapeutic relationship.

TFP typically involves two to three sessions per week, each lasting 45–50 minutes. Treatment begins with a contract defining patient and therapist responsibilities, including safety measures for suicidal and self-destructive behaviors. The therapeutic process centers on identifying object relations in the transference, interpreting associated affects and defenses (e.g., splitting, idealization, devaluation), and fostering integration of polarized self- and object-representations.

Randomized controlled trials have found TFP effective in reducing suicidality, anger, and impulsivity, and in improving reflective functioning and interpersonal capacity.

== Theory on narcissism and relationship to Kohut ==
Kernberg distinguished between normal and pathological forms of narcissism. Pathological narcissism, in his view, involves libidinal investment in a pathological self-structure and manifests in conditions such as narcissistic personality disorder.

His views have often been contrasted with those of Heinz Kohut, founder of self psychology. Kernberg emphasized aggression, primitive defenses, and pathological object relations in narcissistic pathology, while Kohut emphasized developmental arrest and unmet empathic needs.

In clinical technique, Kernberg recommended confronting and interpreting narcissistic defenses, whereas Kohut advocated sustaining empathic responsiveness to narcissistic transferences. Their divergent approaches shaped one of the central debates in late 20th-century psychoanalysis.

== Developmental model ==
Kernberg proposed a developmental model of personality organization that integrates Freud's drive theory with Klein's positions. and Mahler Two critical early tasks are:

- Differentiation of self and other – failure predisposes to psychotic pathology.
- Integration of positive and negative representations – failure underlies borderline personality organization.

He outlined sequential stages: normal autism (0–1 month), symbiosis (2–6 months), differentiation (6–36 months), integration (from ~3 years), and consolidation of ego, superego, and id during the Oedipal period.

Unlike Freud, Kernberg views libidinal and aggressive drives as consolidated from early relational experiences rather than innate.

== Views on group processes and President Donald Trump (as expressed in an interview with Der Spiegel) ==
As the world has recently celebrated the 80th anniversary of the end of World War II and the collapse of the Nazi regime, Otto Kernberg articulated his views on contemporary political leadership and mass psychology in an interview with the German periodical Der Spiegel. Drawing on his clinical experience, psychoanalytic theory, and personal history as a Jewish child who fled National Socialism, Kernberg analyzed what he described as the “Trump phenomenon” within a broader psychological and sociopolitical framework.

Kernberg stated that the defining features of malignant narcissism include grandiosity, aggression, vindictiveness, and a willingness to disregard moral constraints in order to prevail. In his assessment, President Donald Trump exhibits these traits in his political conduct. According to Kernberg, many of Trump’s supporters interpret his demonstrable falsehoods not as a weakness but as a form of boldness or courage directed against a social order they perceive as hostile or corrupt.

Kernberg further argued that Trump’s political appeal rests on a dual strategy: presenting himself simultaneously as an omnipotent leader capable of resolving all problems and as an ordinary person who speaks in a familiar register, violates social norms, and openly attacks perceived enemies. Kernberg compared this mass-psychological dynamic to patterns observed in authoritarian movements of the twentieth century, including the appeal Adolf Hitler exerted over large segments of the German population during the 1930s, while emphasizing that the historical contexts and outcomes differ fundamentally.

In the sphere of international politics, Kernberg speculated that Trump’s behavior reflects underlying insecurity rather than strength. He suggested that Trump is ultimately intimidated by Russian president Vladimir Putin, whom he perceives as genuinely powerful and capable of sustained intimidation. According to Kernberg, Trump avoids direct confrontation with Putin while masking this fear through dismissive or childlike expressions of “disappointment,” thereby maintaining an image of omnipotence for himself and his supporters.

Kernberg also addressed the response of democratic leadership to Trump. He expressed concern that prominent Democratic politicians, including Pennsylvania governor Josh Shapiro and California governor Gavin Newsom, had not opposed Trump with sufficient clarity or firmness. According to Kernberg, hesitation or visible fear in political opponents can reinforce the appeal of authoritarian figures by confirming their image of dominance and discouraging effective democratic resistance.

Kernberg further situated Trump’s rise within longer-term developments in American political culture. He argued that demand for authoritarian leadership had been increasing in the United States prior to Trump’s emergence, partly as a reaction to earlier administrations that visibly supported marginalized and disadvantaged groups. In this context, Kernberg emphasized that the United States remains, in his view, deeply shaped by structural and cultural racism, despite the achievements of the Civil Rights movement and subsequent reforms.

More broadly, Kernberg connected these political developments to fundamental principles of group psychology. He maintained that authoritarianism exerts a powerful attraction because it allows individuals to regress to a childlike state of dependence, in which responsibility is transferred to a leader who promises a perfect and simplified world. Kernberg contrasted this regressive dynamic with the ethical demands of adulthood, which require individuals to tolerate ambiguity, assume responsibility for their own actions, and acknowledge the inherent complexity of social and moral life.

== Honors and recognition ==
Kernberg has received multiple awards for his contributions to psychiatry and psychoanalysis, including:

- Heinz Hartmann Award, New York Psychoanalytic Society and Institute (1972)
- Edward A. Strecker Award, Institute of the Pennsylvania Hospital (1975)
- George E. Daniels Merit Award, Association for Psychoanalytic Medicine (1981)

He served as President of the International Psychoanalytical Association (IPA) from 1997 to 2001. Kernberg is a current Honorary President of IPA since September 10, 2025.

== Personal life ==
Otto Kernberg was married to child psychiatrist Paulina Kernberg until her death in 2006. In 2008 he married psychologist Catherine Haran.

== See also ==
- Object relations theory
- Borderline personality disorder
- Identity disturbance
- Self psychology
- International Psychoanalytical Association
