= Adolph Stern =

American psychiatrist and psychoanalyst

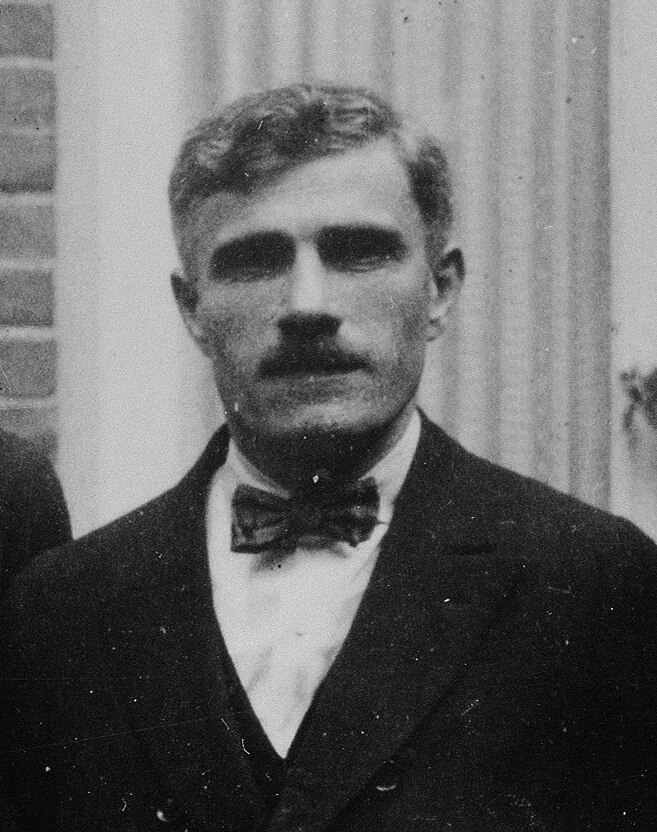
Adolph Stern in 1920

Adolph Stern (1879 – 20 August 1958 or 22 August 1958) was an American psychiatrist and psychoanalyst. He is credited with providing the first formal account of what he termed "Borderline Group", which later became known as borderline personality disorder.

== Life ==
Adolph Stern arrived in the United States at the age of 4 from Hungary. He received his Bachelor of Arts in 1898 from City University of New York and his MD from Columbia University. He then worked for 3 years as a resident physician at Kings Park Psychiatric Center. He then practiced in New York in Neurology and psychiatry. He first became interested in psychoanalysis in 1910, and by 1915 had joined the American Psychoanalytic Association. From 1914 to 1917 he was affiliated with the Neurological and Vanderbilt Clinic. In 1920 he was analysed by Sigmund Freud. Between 1920 and 1922 he was co-chief of the Mental Hygiene department of the Mount Sinai Hospital alongside Dr Oberndorf.

From 1927 to 1928 he was president of the American Psychoanalytic Association. He was also president of the New York Psychoanalytic Society on three occasions 1922–1923, 1924–1925, and 1940–1942. From the foundation of the New York Psychoanalytic Institute in 1931 he was an instructor there, and was an emeritus instructor at the time of his death.

Adolph Stern identified the "borderline group" of patients as those who do not fit into psychotic or psychoneurotic categories, often exhibiting symptoms such as narcissism, psychic rigidity, and profound feelings of inferiority. Stern worked with patients he classified as part of the "borderline group", who he felt did not respond well to traditional psychoanalytic therapy (Stern, 1938). He observed that these patients often had histories of trauma, leading him to advocate for more active and supportive techniques.These patients typically experience acute neuroses like anxiety and depression. Stern emphasizes the need for prolonged supportive treatment before traditional psychoanalytic techniques can be effectively applied (Stern, 1938). He highlights the intense dependency and emotional immaturity of these patients, which complicates their engagement in therapy. By focusing on the transference relationship, therapists can help these patients develop healthier coping mechanisms and emotional maturity, ultimately enhancing the therapeutic process (Stern, 1938).

=== Death ===
He died on 20 or 22 August 1958 following a short illness, whilst vacationing in his holiday home in New Jersey. Other sources state he died of a heart attack in Lenox Hill Hospital. Prior to his death he lived on 134 West Fifty-fifth Street, New York. He was survived by his widow Mamie and brothers John, Albert, Benjamin, and Peter.

== Important works ==
- Adolph Stern (1938) "Psychoanalytic Investigation of and Therapy in the Border Line Group of Neuroses", The Psychoanalytic Quarterly, 7:4, 467–489, doi:10.1080/21674086.1938.11925367
- Adolph Stern (1957). "The Transference in the Borderline Group of Neuroses", Journal of the American Psychoanalytic Association, 5(2), 348–350. doi:10.1177/000306515700500211
