= Jeffrey Young (psychologist) =

American psychologist (born 1950)

Jeffrey E. Young
- Born: March 9, 1950 (age 76)
- Education: Yale University; University of Pennsylvania
- Known for: Schema therapy
- Notable work: Schema Therapy; Reinventing Your Life
- Scientific career
- Fields: Psychology
- Workplaces: Schema Therapy Institute
- Academic advisors: Aaron Beck

Jeffrey E. Young (born March 9, 1950) is an American psychologist best known for having developed schema therapy. He is the founder of the Schema Therapy Institute.

After earning an undergraduate degree at Yale University, he obtained a higher education degree at the University of Pennsylvania, where he then pursued postdoctoral studies with Aaron Beck.

He has written numerous books on cognitive behavioral therapy and schema therapy. His two most famous books are Schema Therapy (for professionals), and Reinventing Your Life (for the general public).

When interviewed in 2021, Jeffrey Young said a critical part of being effective in delivering Schema Therapy is to understand that culture affects schemas and modes.

== Publications ==
Young, Jeffrey E.; Klosko, Janet S.; Weishaar, Marjorie E. (2003). Schema therapy: a practitioner's guide. New York: The Guilford Press. ISBN 978-1-57230-838-1.

== Sources ==
- Van Nuys, David. "An Interview with Jeffrey Young, Ph.D. on Schema Therapy". Pecan Valley Centers. Archived from the original on March 5, 2016.
