= Construct (psychology) =

Psychological concept

In psychology, a construct, also called a hypothetical construct or psychological construct, is a sophisticated cognitive framework that individuals and cultures use to interpret, understand, and predict social reality. Rather than simple labels for behaviors, psychological constructs represent complex meaning-making systems that shape how people anticipate events, interpret experiences, and organize their understanding of the world.

Constructs fundamentally differ from related concepts such as habits, customs, or behaviors. While habits represent automatic behavioral patterns and customs reflect socially transmitted practices, constructs are the underlying cognitive systems that give these phenomena their meaning and significance. A construct operates as an interpretive lens through which individuals make sense of their experiences and anticipate future events.

Behavioral sciences recognize multiple types of constructs, including personal constructs (individual meaning-making systems), social constructs (shared cultural frameworks), and theoretical constructs (research tools for understanding complex phenomena). Examples include cultural constructs about appropriate social behavior, personal constructs about interpersonal relationships, and theoretical constructs such as intelligence, self-esteem, and political power.

== Theoretical foundations ==
=== Kelly's Personal Construct Theory ===
George Kelly's 1955 work "The Psychology of Personal Constructs" established the foundational framework for understanding psychological constructs. Kelly's theory treats individuals as scientists who develop personal theories (constructs) about their world, form hypotheses based on these constructs, and revise their understanding through experience.

Kelly's fundamental postulate states that "a person's processes are psychologically channelized by the ways in which he anticipates events." This emphasizes constructs as predictive tools rather than mere descriptive categories. Personal constructs are bipolar (organized around contrasts like "friendly-hostile" or "competent-incompetent"), hierarchically arranged, and individually unique based on each person's particular history and perspective.

The theory operates through eleven corollaries, including the dichotomy corollary (constructs are bipolar), the choice corollary (people choose options that elaborate their construct systems), and the sociality corollary (understanding others requires comprehending their construct systems). Kelly's repertory grid technique remains widely used in clinical and research settings to assess individual construct systems.

=== Social constructivism ===
Peter L. Berger and Thomas Luckmann's 1966 work The Social Construction of Reality established the theoretical framework for understanding shared meaning systems. Their model describes how social constructs develop through a three-stage process: externalization (projecting meanings onto the world), objectivation (meanings acquiring apparent objective reality), and internalization (reincorporating "objective" meanings into consciousness).

Kenneth Gergen's social constructionist psychology argues that psychological knowledge emerges from social interchange rather than objective discovery. This challenges traditional notions of psychological universals and emphasizes the culturally and historically situated nature of psychological constructs. Social constructionism demonstrates that many concepts taken as natural facts (such as gender roles, racial categories, and mental illness classifications) are actually constructed through ongoing social processes.

=== Cultural psychology ===
Richard Shweder's cultural psychology framework demonstrates that persons, cultures, and psychological processes "make each other up" through ongoing interaction. This approach shows that different cultural contexts require different psychological theories, challenging assumptions about universal psychological processes.

Hazel Markus and Shinobu Kitayama's research on independent and interdependent self-construals exemplifies cultural construct variation. Independent self-construals (emphasized in Western cultures) view the self as autonomous and bounded, while interdependent self-construals (common in East Asian cultures) define the self through relationships and social connections. These fundamentally different meaning-making frameworks shape cognition, emotion, and motivation in systematic ways.

== Types of constructs ==
=== Personal constructs ===
Personal constructs represent individual meaning-making systems based on Kelly's theory. These are bipolar, hierarchically organized frameworks that individuals develop through experience to anticipate and interpret events. Each person's construct system is unique, reflecting their particular history, cultural background, and personal experiences.

Personal constructs operate through contrast and comparison. For example, one person might organize their understanding of others around the construct "trustworthy-untrustworthy," while another person might focus on "exciting-boring." These different construct systems lead to different interpretations of the same social situations and different behavioral choices.

=== Social constructs ===
Social constructs emerge from collective agreement and social interchange. These represent shared meaning systems maintained through ongoing social processes rather than individual cognition. Examples include money, marriage, social class, and nationality—concepts that appear objective but derive their reality from collective human activity and agreement.

Social constructs become powerful because they are treated as factual by social groups. Once established, they shape behavior, create institutions, and influence individual psychological development. The process of socialization involves learning these shared construct systems and incorporating them into personal meaning-making frameworks.

=== Cultural constructs ===
Cultural constructs represent culture-specific meaning systems that shape perception within particular historical and social contexts. These differ from social constructs by encompassing deeper unconscious structures that determine behavior patterns and include artistic, experiential, and everyday life processes.

Examples of cultural constructs include concepts of appropriate emotional expression, definitions of family relationships, understandings of time and punctuality, and notions of individual versus collective responsibility. What one culture construes as proper respect (such as avoiding direct eye contact with authority figures), another culture might interpret as disrespect or dishonesty.

=== Theoretical constructs ===
Theoretical constructs serve as research tools for understanding complex phenomena that cannot be directly observed. These facilitate hypothesis formation, guide research design, and provide frameworks for interpreting empirical findings within specific theoretical contexts.

Examples include intelligence, personality traits such as extraversion, attachment styles, and cognitive load. These constructs help researchers organize observations, predict behaviors, and develop interventions, but they represent theoretical abstractions rather than directly observable entities.

== Cross-cultural variations ==
=== Hofstede's cultural dimensions ===
Geert Hofstede's research across over 76 countries identified six dimensions along which cultures systematically vary: power distance, uncertainty avoidance, individualism-collectivism, masculinity-femininity, long-term orientation, and indulgence-restraint. These dimensions represent different cultural frameworks for interpreting social behaviors and relationships.

For example, high power distance cultures construct hierarchical relationships as natural and appropriate, while low power distance cultures interpret the same hierarchies as problematic inequality. These represent fundamentally different meaning-making systems for understanding social organization rather than simply different preferences.

=== Specific cultural construct examples ===
==== Concepts of time and punctuality ====
Different cultures construct time in fundamentally different ways. Monochronic cultures (such as Germany and Switzerland) construct time as linear, measurable, and controllable, leading to strong emphasis on punctuality and scheduling. Polychronic cultures (such as many Latin American and Middle Eastern societies) construct time as flexible and relationship-dependent, prioritizing social interactions over strict schedules.

==== Social interaction constructs ====
Cultural constructs around appropriate social behavior vary dramatically. In many East Asian cultures, the construct of "face" (maintaining dignity and social standing) shapes interactions in ways that emphasize indirect communication and conflict avoidance. Western cultures often construct directness and explicit communication as signs of honesty and respect, leading to very different interaction patterns.

The construct of appropriate physical distance during conversation also varies culturally. Northern European and North American cultures typically construct closer physical proximity as invasive, while many Latin American and Middle Eastern cultures interpret the same distance as normal and interpret greater distance as cold or unfriendly.

==== Emotional expression constructs ====
Cultures develop different constructs about appropriate emotional expression. Research by Hareli, Kafetsios, and Hess (2015) found significant cultural differences in emotional display rules across Germany, Israel, Greece, and the United States. Some cultures construct open emotional expression as healthy and authentic, while others view emotional restraint as mature and respectful.

==== Food and eating constructs ====
Cultural constructs around food and eating demonstrate remarkable variation. Some cultures construct eating with hands as normal and intimate, while others view it as unsanitary or improper. Belching after meals is constructed as a compliment to the host in some Middle Eastern cultures but as rude behavior in many Western contexts. These represent different meaning systems for interpreting the same behaviors rather than different arbitrary rules.

== Relationship to other concepts ==
=== Distinction from habits ===
Constructs differ fundamentally from habits in their cognitive complexity and conscious accessibility. Habits represent "automatic, repetitive actions regulated by impulsive processes with minimal cognitive effort," while constructs are conscious interpretive frameworks requiring mental processing for meaning-making and anticipation.

For example, automatically checking one's phone upon waking represents a habit, while the belief that immediate communication availability demonstrates professional competence represents a construct. The construct gives the habit its meaning and significance within the person's broader worldview.

=== Distinction from schemas ===
While cognitive schemas organize information for memory and processing, constructs emphasize meaning-making and predictive functions. Schemas represent knowledge structures that help categorize and process information efficiently, while constructs are broader systems that include anticipatory and interpretive elements beyond information organization.

A schema might organize knowledge about "restaurants" (typical features, expected sequences, role relationships), while a construct about "social dining" might include personal meanings about intimacy, status display, cultural identity, and relationship maintenance that extend beyond factual knowledge.

=== Distinction from stereotypes ===
Stereotypes represent simplified, often inaccurate generalizations about social groups, while constructs are sophisticated meaning-making systems that can accommodate complexity and change. Stereotypes tend to be rigid and resistant to disconfirming evidence, while healthy construct systems remain open to revision based on new experiences.

However, some individual constructs can become stereotype-like when they become overly rigid or are applied inappropriately across situations. Personal construct therapy often involves helping clients develop more flexible and permeable construct systems.

== Methodological aspects ==
=== Construct validity ===
Construct validity represents the degree to which a test or measurement actually assesses the theoretical construct it claims to measure. Lee Cronbach and Paul Meehl's 1955 work established that constructs require continuous validation through multiple sources rather than single-study confirmation.

Their nomological network approach defines constructs through relationships to other constructs and observable behaviors, creating theoretical frameworks that guide empirical investigation. Contemporary approaches emphasize convergent validity (measures correspond to related constructs) and discriminant validity (measures differ from distinct constructs).

=== Statistical approaches ===
Factor analysis and structural equation modeling have become standard methods for construct identification and validation. These techniques allow researchers to examine underlying relationships between observed variables and theoretical constructs while accounting for measurement error and complex relationships.

Network analysis approaches represent emerging methodologies that treat constructs as nodes within complex relationship networks rather than isolated latent variables. This reflects growing recognition that constructs exist within dynamic, interconnected systems rather than as independent entities.

== Applications ==
=== Clinical psychology ===
Personal construct therapy demonstrates how understanding clients' meaning-making systems enables therapeutic change rather than merely applying diagnostic labels. The repertory grid technique reveals how individuals organize their social world, identifying areas where construct systems may be limiting or causing distress.

Recent integration with evidence-based practice maintains personal construct therapy's phenomenological emphasis while incorporating empirical validation. Applications to specific problems (grief, trauma, career transitions) show how construct theory addresses complex human experiences through understanding individual meaning systems.

=== Educational psychology ===
Constructivist educational approaches recognize that learning involves active meaning construction rather than passive information absorption. This understanding transforms teaching from information delivery to facilitating students' construct development and elaboration.

Student-centered learning, problem-based instruction, and scaffolding techniques reflect constructivist recognition that learning involves individual meaning-making processes rather than simple information transfer. Teachers become facilitators who help students connect new information to existing construct systems and develop more sophisticated ways of understanding their subjects.

=== Organizational psychology ===
Organizational applications of repertory grid techniques include team performance assessment, leadership development, and organizational change management. These approaches help organizations understand how employees make sense of their work environments, identify sources of conflict or inefficiency, and develop more effective communication and collaboration strategies.

Understanding construct systems helps organizations navigate cultural differences in international business, improve leadership effectiveness across diverse teams, and facilitate organizational change by addressing underlying meaning systems that drive organizational culture and performance.

== Contemporary developments ==
=== Psychological construction approach ===
The psychological construction approach represents a significant recent advancement challenging traditional assumptions about psychological constructs. This framework treats psychological states as "recipe-like constructions" made from basic ingredients (concepts, core affect, behavioral repertoire, prior experience) rather than fixed categories.

This approach suggests that the same psychological state may be constructed as cognition, emotion, or behavior depending on the individual's meaning-making process and situational context. It challenges traditional boundary distinctions between cognitive, emotional, and behavioral phenomena.

=== Digital age considerations ===
Contemporary research examines how digital communication technologies influence construct formation and validation. Social media, online communities, and virtual reality environments create new contexts for construct development and may accelerate the formation of shared meaning systems across traditional cultural boundaries.

Research on online identity formation, digital relationships, and virtual group dynamics explores how traditional construct theory applies to technologically mediated experiences and whether entirely new construct categories may be emerging.

== See also ==
- Personal construct theory
- Social constructionism
- Cultural psychology
- Construct validity
- Repertory grid
- Schema (psychology)
- Social construction
- Cognitive framework
- Mental model
- Worldview
- Paradigm
- Cross-cultural psychology
- Phenomenology (psychology)
