= South Haven Township, Kansas =

Township in Sumner County, Kansas, U.S.

South Haven Township
- Township
- Location within Sumner County
- Coordinates: 37.064073°N 97.419283°W
- Country: United States
- State: Kansas
- County: Sumner
- Established: 1871

Government
  - Trustee: Howard Strickland

Area
  - Total: 54.012 sq mi (139.89 km^{2})
  - Land: 54.012 sq mi (139.89 km^{2})
  - Water: 0 sq mi (0 km^{2}) 0%

Population (2020)
  - Total: 524
  - Density: 9.70/sq mi (3.75/km^{2})
- Time zone: UTC-6 (CST)
  - Summer (DST): UTC-5 (CDT)
- Area code: 620
- GNIS feature ID: 470085

South Haven Township is a township in Sumner County, Kansas, United States. As of the 2020 census, its population was 524.

== History ==
South Haven Township was established in 1871. In 1873, Guelph Township was created from part of South Haven Township. In 1874, Jackson Township was created from part of South Haven Township.

== Geography ==
South Haven Township covers an area of 54.012 square miles (139.89 km^{2}), all of it land. The Chikaskia River flows through it, as well as Meridian Creek and Shoo Fly Creek.

=== Communities ===
- Hunnewell
- South Haven

=== Adjacent townships ===
Jackson Township, Sumner County
Downs Township, Sumner Count	northwest	north	northeast	Greene Township, Sumner County
Falls Township, Sumner County	west	self	east	Guelph Township, Sumner County
Grant County, Oklahoma	southwest	south
Kay County, Oklahoma

== Transportation ==
=== Major highways ===
- US-81
- US-166
- US-177

== Demographics ==
As of the 2020 census, the township had a population of 524, giving a population density of 33.06 people per square mile (12.76 people/km^{2}). The racial makeup of the township was 92.4% White, 1.1% Native American, 0.2% Asian, 1.9% from some other race, and 4.4% from two or more races. Hispanics or Latinos of any race were 6.7% of the population.

The 2020–2024 American Community Survey estimated that the township contained 193 households and 222 housing units.
