= Caldwell Township, Kansas =

Township in Sumner County, Kansas, U.S.

Caldwell Township
- Township
- Location within Sumner County
- Coordinates: 37.061248°N 97.64566°W
- Country: United States
- State: Kansas
- County: Sumner
- Established: 1871

Government
  - Trustee: Lonnie Schmidt

Area
  - Total: 52.55 sq mi (136.1 km^{2})
  - Land: 52.541 sq mi (136.08 km^{2})
  - Water: 0.009 sq mi (0.023 km^{2}) 0.02%

Population (2020)
  - Total: 129
  - Density: 2.46/sq mi (0.948/km^{2})
- Time zone: UTC-6 (CST)
  - Summer (DST): UTC-5 (CDT)
- Area code: 620
- GNIS feature ID: 470117

Caldwell Township is a township in Sumner County, Kansas, United States. As of the 2020 census, its population was 129.

== History ==
Caldwell Township was established in 1871. In 1878, Bluff Township was separated from part of it.

== Geography ==
Caldwell Township covers an area of 52.55 square miles (136.1 square kilometers). Bluff Creek and Fall Creek flow through it. The city of Caldwell is completely surrounded by the township but is governmentally independent of it.

=== Adjacent townships ===
Chikashia Township, Sumner County
Morris Township, Sumner County	northwest	north	northeast	Downs Township, Sumner County
Bluff Township, Sumner County	west	self	east	Falls Township, Sumner County
		south
Grant County, Oklahoma

== Transportation ==
Caldwell Municipal Airport, which serves the city of Caldwell, lies within the township.

=== Major highways ===
- US-81
- K-49

== Demographics ==
As of the 2020 census, there were 129 people and 71 households residing in the township. The population density was 2.46 people per square mile (0.95 people/km^{2}). There were 99 housing units. The racial makeup of the township was 93.8% White, 1.6% Native American, 1.6% from some other race, and 3.1% from two or more races.

There were 71 households: 47.9% were married couples living together, 14.1% had a male householder with no spouse present, and 38.0% had a female householder with no spouse present. The average family size was 2.98 people. 52.0% of people in the township older than 24 had a college degree, and the township had an employment rate of 73.7%.
