= Coherence therapy =

System of psychotherapy

Coherence therapy is a system of psychotherapy based in the theory that symptoms of mood, thought and behavior are produced coherently according to the person's current mental models of reality, most of which are implicit and unconscious. It was created by Bruce Ecker and Laurel Hulley, who first described it in their 1996 book Depth Oriented Brief Therapy.

== History ==
Ecker and Hulley began developing coherence therapy in the late 1980s and early 1990s as they investigated, in their clinical practice of psychotherapy, why certain sessions seemed to produce deep transformations of emotional meaning and unambiguous symptom cessation, while most sessions did not. Studying many such sessions for several years, they concluded that in these sessions, the therapist had desisted from doing anything to oppose or counteract the symptom, and the client had a powerful, felt experience of some previously unrecognized "emotional truth" that was making the symptom necessary to have. Ecker and Hulley began developing a collection of experiential methods to intentionally facilitate this process, adopting some relevant existing clinical techniques. They began teaching the system in 1993 and first published it in their 1996 book Depth Oriented Brief Therapy. In 2005, Ecker and Hulley began calling the system coherence therapy in order for the name to more clearly reflect the central principle of the approach. In 2012, they published with coauthor Robin Ticic the book Unlocking the Emotional Brain, which described how their system's central principle could also be demonstrated in other systems of psychotherapy.

== General description ==
The basis of coherence therapy is the principle of symptom coherence. This is the view that any response of the brain–mind–body system is an expression of coherent personal constructs (or schemas), which are nonverbal, emotional, perceptual and somatic knowings, not verbal-cognitive propositions. A therapy client's presenting symptoms are understood as an activation and enactment of specific constructs. The principle of symptom coherence can be found in varying degrees, explicitly or implicitly, in the writings of a number of historical psychotherapy theorists, including Sigmund Freud (1923), Harry Stack Sullivan (1948), Carl Jung (1964), R. D. Laing (1967), Gregory Bateson (1972), Virginia Satir (1972), Paul Watzlawick (1974), Eugene Gendlin (1982), Vittorio Guidano & Giovanni Liotti (1983), Les Greenberg (1993), Bessel van der Kolk (1994), Robert Kegan & Lisa Lahey (2001), Sue Johnson (2004), and others.

The principle of symptom coherence maintains that an individual's seemingly irrational, out-of-control symptoms are (with some exceptions) sensible, cogent, orderly expressions of the person's existing constructions of self and world, rather than a disorder or pathology. Even a person's psychological resistance to change is seen as a result of the coherence of the person's mental constructions. Thus, coherence therapy, like some other postmodern therapies, approaches a person's resistance to change as an ally in psychotherapy and not an enemy.

Coherence therapy is considered a type of psychological constructivism. It differs from some other forms of constructivism in that the principle of symptom coherence is fully explicit and operationalized, guiding and informing the entire methodology. The process of coherence therapy is experiential rather than analytic, and in this regard is similar to Gestalt therapy, Focusing or Hakomi. The aim is for the client to come into direct, emotional experience of the unconscious personal constructs (akin to complexes or ego-states) which produce an unwanted symptom and to undergo a natural process of revising or dissolving these constructs, thereby eliminating the symptom. Practitioners claim that the entire process often requires a dozen sessions or less, although it can take longer when the meanings and emotions underlying the symptom are particularly complex or intense.

== Symptom coherence ==
Symptom coherence is defined by Ecker and Hulley as follows:

1. A person produces a particular symptom because, despite the suffering it entails, the symptom is compellingly necessary to have, according to at least one unconscious, nonverbal, emotionally potent schema or construction of reality.
2. Each symptom-requiring construction is cogent—a sensible, meaningful, well-knit, well-defined schema that was formed adaptively in response to earlier experiences and is still carried and applied in the present.
3. The person ceases producing the symptom as soon as there no longer exists any construction of reality in which the symptom is necessary to have.

There are several forms of symptom coherence. Some symptoms are necessary because they serve a crucial function (such as depression that protects against feeling and expressing anger), while others have no function but are necessary in the sense of being an inevitable effect, or by-product, caused by some other adaptive, coherent but unconscious response (such as depression resulting from isolation, which itself is a strategy for feeling safe). Both functional and functionless symptoms are coherent, according to the client's own material.

In other words, the theory states that symptoms are produced by how the individual strives, without conscious awareness, to carry out self-protecting or self-affirming purposes formed in the course of living. This model of symptom production fits into the broader category of psychological constructivism, which views the person as having profound, if unrecognized, agency in shaping experience and behavior.

Symptom coherence does not apply to those symptoms that are not directly or indirectly caused by implicit schemas or emotional learnings—for example, hypothyroidism-induced depression, autism, and biochemical addiction.

== Hierarchical organization of constructs ==
As a tool for identifying all of a person's relevant schemas or constructions of reality, Ecker and Hulley defined several logically hierarchical domains or orders of construction (inspired by Gregory Bateson):

- The first order consists of a person's overt responses: thoughts, feelings, and behaviors.
- The second order consists of the person's specific meaning of the concrete situation to which they are responding.
- The third order consists of the person's broad purposes and strategies for construing that specific meaning (teleology).
- The fourth order consists of the person's general meaning of the nature of self, others, and the world (ontology and primal world beliefs).
- The fifth order consists of the person's broad purposes and strategies for construing that general meaning.
- Higher orders (beyond the fifth order) are rarely involved in psychotherapy.

A person's first-order symptoms of thought, mood, or behavior follow from a second-order construal of the situation, and that second-order construal is powerfully influenced by the person's third- and fourth-order constructions. Hence the third and higher orders constitute what Ecker and Hulley call "the emotional truth of the symptom", which are the meanings and purposes that are intended to be discovered, integrated, and transformed in therapy.

== Evidence from neuroscience ==
In a series of three articles published in the Journal of Constructivist Psychology from 2007 to 2009, Bruce Ecker and Brian Toomey presented evidence that coherence therapy may be one of the systems of psychotherapy which, according to current neuroscience, makes fullest use of the brain's built-in capacities for change.

Ecker and Toomey argued that the mechanism of change in coherence therapy correlates with the recently discovered neural process of memory reconsolidation, a process that can "unwire" and delete longstanding emotional conditioning held in implicit memory. They claim that coherence therapy achieves implicit memory deletion and also claim that it aligns with the growing body of evidence supporting memory reconsolidation. Ecker and colleagues claim that: (a) their procedural steps match those identified by neuroscientists for reconsolidation, (b) their procedural steps result in effortless cessation of symptoms, and (c) the emotional experience of the retrieved, symptom-generating emotional schemas can no longer be evoked by cues that formerly evoked it strongly.

The process of removing the neural basis of the symptom in coherence therapy (and in similar postmodern therapies) is different from the counteractive strategy of some behavioral therapies. In such behavioral therapies, new preferred behavioral patterns are typically practiced to compete against and hopefully override the unwanted ones; this counteractive process, like the "extinction" of conditioned responses in animals, is known to be inherently unstable and prone to relapse, because the neural circuit of the unwanted pattern continues to exist even when the unwanted pattern is in abeyance. Through reconsolidation, the unwanted neural circuits are "unwired" and cannot relapse.

== See also ==
- Client-centered therapy
- Cognitive therapy § Cognitive model
- Decisional balance sheet § ABC model
- Emotionally focused therapy
- Immunity to change
- Method of levels
- Post-rationalist cognitive therapy
- Postmodern psychology
- Schema therapy
