= Constructivism (psychological school) =

Psychological school of thought

In psychology, constructivism refers to many schools of thought which, though different in different branches of psychology using different techniques. Despite these differences, psychologists sharing a constructivist paradigm offer a common critique of previous standard approaches, such as behaviorism’s stimulus-reaction presentation of behaviour or associatism, "by which the mind is conceived as a passive system that gathers its contents from its environment and, through the act of knowing, produces a copy of the order of reality". In contrast to these old approaches, constructivism asserts that all psychological phenomena – from physical actions to cognitive processes – are being constructed (generated) every time anew based on the current state of the body, context, available resources, previous experience and habits, and many other factors Construction of behaviour proceeds as selection and sequencing of actions, emotions and percepts.

The constructivism principles were observed and described in biology before the 20th century, and were reflected in the theories of evolution and genetics. Biological phenomena and behavioural are known for there generative nature, compositions and renovations of observed structures such as biomolecules, cell, human relationships, groups and organizations. The dependence of biological constructions from environment, past and current states and needs is seen in regeneration, DNA and Biosynthesis processes.

In psychology, however, the behaviourism paradigm (presenting behaviour as passive reaction to stimuli after associations have been established) continues being prominent even nowadays and is not compatible with constructism principles.

== Experimental work in psychology demonstrated constructivism principles ==
=== Habit formation research by Bernstein ===
Experimental evidence for constructivism principles first emerged Nikolai Bernstein' work on habit formation and stages of action, which led to his “action construction” model and a theory. In 1930-s, Bernstein used his original tracking devices that were positioned on the bodies of experts and dilletants in various professions. These experiments described multiple examples of "repetition without repetition" in generation of actions, contrary to classical conditioning principles of behaviourism. According to Bernstein, there are simply too many “degrees of freedom” in actions that could be tuned to various stimuli – and so he was first to formulate the Degrees of freedom problem. If nervous system has such multiplicity in stimuli and responses, learned reflexes could act simultaneously and make behaviour very chaotic. Instead, as Bernstein had demonstrated with his measurements, the nervous system has several stages of selection and sequencing the “program of action” and then using feedback comparing the result with the planned program while executing the action. This process, starting from selection, sequencing and proceeding with execution and feedback, was named by Bernstein “action’s construction”. Bernstein’s methods and theory created a new discipline of kinesiology.

=== Cognitive psychology ===
Around 1930-s, Frederic Bartlett’s experiments in cognitive psychology highlighted the (re-)constructive nature of memory’s recall.

From 1960s till nowadays, many researchers in cognitive psychology described constructivism phenomena. Karl Pribram described neuronal holographic effects in construction of cognitive processes in the brain highlighted the dependence of cognitive processes (such as memory, attention, thinking) from convergence of activations of multiple here-and-now networks. These activations change their contribution depending on various factors and, therefore, are variable and context-dependent. Ulric Neisser had much more extensive experimental demonstrations of context dependence of memory.

American Psychologist George Kelly (1905–1967) offered the Personal construct theory, underlying the observations that people use different, individually-developed criteria in estimations of events and information. Kelly’s theory became the bases of Charles Osgood’s Semantic differential method that was widely used in psychosemantics starting from 1960s. The research into generation of meaning using Kelly’s and Osgood’s methods showed that meaning attribution does not depend just on the context: it also depends on the state of the body, as it was shown in embodied cognition research. The key biologically-individual differences such as sex and temperament (endurance, tempo, emotionality) were found to influence high cognitive functions such as meaning attribution.

Constructivist cognitive psychologists also theorize about and investigate how human beings create systems for meaningfully understanding their worlds and experiences.

=== Neuroscience ===
Constructivism phenomena in neuroscience were described in all fields of neuroscience.

In neurochemistry, practically all neurotransmitters regulating the behaviour are not permanently stored in the nerve endigs but have to be composed every time anew before neurotransmission. Neurochemical framework Functional Ensemble of Temperament that summarized teams-like relationships between neurotransmitters, hormones and opioid receptor systems, used Functional Constructivism approach in its structure. This approach suggests using the stages and universal functional aspects of behavioural constructions as the basis for biobehavioural taxonomies.

In neuroanatomy, brain’s neuroplasticity allows brain to develop (construct) and update the connectivity between brain cells.

In neuroelectrophysiology, Karl Pribram’s holonomic theory of the brain also highlighted the generative, constructive (and not reactive) nature of mental processes and behavoiur. American neuroscientist Walter Jackson Freeman III, a analysed neuroelectrodynamics of the brain and described development of chaotic attractors in neurodynamics of electric potentials, which generate perceptual and cognitive dispositions, helping individuals to recognize environmental information faster and in subjectively relevant way. Trofimova presented Freeman’s anticipatory attractors theory as example of “Throw and Catch mechanism illustrating constructivism principles in nervous system. Freeman summarized his conclusions in the statement “behavior is proactive, not reactive”.

=== Psychology of emotions ===
In psychology of emotions, prominent constructivism approach was offered by American psychologists Barrett, Lindquist, Russell and others. They showed that emotions are generated based on the context, state of the body and previous experience and can be compositions and variations of several “basic emotions”.

=== Gibson’s ecological approach in psychology ===
James J. Gibson highlighted the fact that that behaviour always has “psychological ecology”, i.e. social and physical contexts defining the choice of actions. The context can have individual ecological compatibility with individual’s capacities and motivation and, therefore, affects the construction of behaviour.

=== Psychology of education ===
Constructivist psychology when applied to education emphasizes that students are always engaged in a process of actively constructing meaning—a process which "the teacher can only facilitate or thwart, but not himself invent".

Jean Piaget's theory describes how children do not simply mimic everything that is part of the external environment, but rather that developing and learning is an ongoing process and interchange between individuals and their surroundings, a process through which individuals develop increasingly complex schemas. According to Angela O'Donnell and colleagues, constructivism describes how a learner constructs knowledge via different concepts: complex cognition, scaffolding, vicarious experiences, modeling, and observational learning. This makes students, teachers, the environment and anyone or anything else with which the student has an interaction active participants in their learning.

== Constructivism in psychotherapy ==
Constructivist psychotherapy is a broad family of psychological approaches that share the idea that human beings do not simply perceive and respond to an objective reality. Rather, they actively organize experience through systems of meaning, interpretation, and personal knowledge. From this perspective, psychological problems are not understood exclusively as the result of distorted perceptions or maladaptive behaviors. They can also arise when a person's established ways of interpreting experience become rigid, inadequate, or unable to accommodate new experiences..

Some particularly influential approaches of constructivist psychotherapy are: George Kelly's Personal Construct Psychology, Vittorio Guidano's post-rationalist cognitive approach, and the narrative therapy developed by Michael White and David Epston. Although these approaches differ considerably in their theoretical assumptions and therapeutic techniques, all three reject the idea that psychological functioning can be adequately understood by treating the individual as a passive recipient of external information.

George Kelly and Personal Construct Psychotherapy

George Kelly's Personal Construct Psychology (PCP) represents one of the foundational formulations of constructivist psychotherapy. Kelly developed his theory most systematically in The Psychology of Personal Constructs (1955). His central proposition was that people function as scientists: they continually develop hypotheses about the world, anticipate events, test those anticipations against experience, and revise their systems of interpretation when necessary.

For Kelly, people do not encounter reality in a completely unmediated way. Instead, they construe events through personal constructs. A construct is a dimension of meaning that allows a person to distinguish between experiences. Constructs are typically bipolar, such as “trustworthy–untrustworthy,” “independent–dependent,” or “successful–unsuccessful.” Through these constructs, individuals organize their experiences and anticipate what is likely to happen.

Kelly formulated this idea in his famous “fundamental postulate”: “A person's processes are psychologically channelized by the ways in which he anticipates events” (Kelly, 1955). The important point is that psychological functioning is organized around anticipation. People construct meanings partly because these meanings allow them to predict and navigate future experiences.

Personal constructs are not necessarily conscious. Individuals may possess highly elaborated systems of meaning without being able to articulate them explicitly. Furthermore, constructs are organized hierarchically and interconnectedly. A change in one construct may therefore affect the meaning of many other experiences.

Psychological difficulties can emerge when a person's construct system becomes overly rigid or when it fails to provide adequate alternatives for interpreting experience. A person who has constructed the world primarily in terms of “strong versus weak,” for example, may experience vulnerability, dependence, or uncertainty as unacceptable because these experiences cannot easily be incorporated into the existing system.

Psychotherapy consequently involves exploring the client's personal construction system rather than simply correcting supposedly irrational beliefs. The therapist seeks to understand how the client construes significant people, events, and the self, and how these constructions organize anticipation and action.

One particularly distinctive technique associated with Kelly is the repertory grid, which provides a systematic method for eliciting and examining personal constructs. Another technique is fixed-role therapy, in which clients are invited to experiment with alternative ways of construing and acting. The purpose is not simply to discover the “correct” interpretation of reality but to increase the client's capacity to construct alternative possibilities.

Thus, Kelly's approach presents psychotherapy as a process of reconstructing meaning. Psychological change occurs when people become capable of construing their experience in more flexible and personally viable ways.

Vittorio Guidano and the Post-Rationalist Approach

Vittorio Guidano developed a different form of constructivist cognitive therapy, commonly known as post-rationalist cognitive therapy. His work emerged partly from the cognitive tradition associated with Aaron Beck and Albert Ellis, but he argued that traditional cognitive approaches placed too much emphasis on explicit thoughts and rational evaluation.

For Guidano, human experience cannot be adequately understood by treating cognition as a collection of isolated propositions or beliefs. Human beings are self-organizing systems that continuously construct a coherent sense of self and personal identity. The central problem is therefore not simply whether a particular belief is rational or irrational, but how the individual maintains a coherent organization of personal experience across time.

Guidano placed particular emphasis on the distinction between experience and explanation. Human beings continuously experience themselves and the world, but they also interpret and narrate those experiences. These two processes are closely related but are not identical. A person's immediate, ongoing experience may subsequently be organized into a more explicit explanation of “who I am” and “what is happening to me.”

This temporal dimension is central to Guidano's theory. Personal identity involves the construction of a continuous sense of self despite the constant transformation of experience. Individuals attempt to maintain a coherent narrative identity that connects past, present, and anticipated future.

Guidano also emphasized the importance of interpersonal relationships in the development of personal identity. Early patterns of attachment and emotional regulation contribute to the development of relatively stable ways of organizing experience. These organizations are not simply collections of beliefs; they represent broader patterns through which individuals experience themselves, others, and their emotional world.

In psychotherapy, therefore, the therapist does not simply challenge dysfunctional cognitions. Instead, therapy involves helping clients observe the way they organize their experience and reconstruct the coherence of their personal narratives. The therapeutic process encourages a more differentiated awareness of the relationship between immediate experience and the explanations through which that experience is organized.

The “post-rationalist” label reflects Guidano's rejection of the assumption that human psychological functioning is fundamentally governed by conscious rational thought. Emotional experience, tacit processes, interpersonal patterns, and the individual's attempt to maintain a coherent identity are considered fundamental aspects of cognition.

Guidano's approach therefore represents an important transition from traditional cognitive therapy toward a more phenomenological and constructivist understanding of the person. Rather than asking only whether a person's interpretation is objectively correct, the therapist asks how that interpretation participates in the individual's ongoing construction of selfhood.

Michael White, David Epston, and Narrative Therapy

Narrative therapy, developed primarily by Michael White and David Epston, represents another influential development within the constructivist tradition. Their approach is particularly concerned with the relationship between language, meaning, identity, and social context.

A central assumption of narrative therapy is that people understand their lives through stories. These stories do not merely describe an already-existing identity; they participate in constructing that identity. Individuals select, organize, and interpret experiences in ways that produce relatively coherent narratives about who they are.

Psychological problems can become especially powerful when they dominate a person's narrative identity. For example, a person who repeatedly interprets experiences through a story of “failure” may gradually organize apparently unrelated events around this theme. Experiences that contradict the dominant story may receive little attention or may be interpreted as exceptions rather than meaningful evidence about the person's capacities.

White and Epston therefore distinguish between people's lives and the problem-saturated stories through which those lives may be represented. Their therapeutic approach seeks to “externalize” problems. Instead of saying that a person “is depressed,” for example, the therapist may explore how “depression” has been influencing the person's life. The problem becomes something that affects the person rather than something that constitutes the person's identity.

This distinction is particularly important because it creates conceptual space for alternative descriptions of the self. Once a dominant problem-saturated narrative has been examined, the therapist searches for experiences that have been overlooked, marginalized, or insufficiently developed. These experiences can become the basis for alternative narratives.

Narrative therapy therefore makes extensive use of questions designed to identify “unique outcomes” or events that do not fit the dominant problem story. A person's decision to resist a problem, a moment of courage, an act of care, or a successful relationship may initially appear insignificant. Through therapeutic exploration, however, such events can become connected to broader themes and contribute to the development of a preferred identity.

White and Epston also emphasize the social and cultural dimensions of identity. Personal narratives do not emerge in isolation. They are shaped by relationships, institutions, cultural expectations, gender norms, social practices, and broader discourses. Narrative therapy consequently situates psychological suffering within a social context rather than reducing it exclusively to processes located inside the individual.

The therapeutic relationship is correspondingly collaborative. The therapist does not occupy the position of an expert who possesses the correct interpretation of the client's life. Instead, therapist and client participate in a process of inquiry in which meanings and alternative possibilities are explored together.

== Genetic epistemology ==
Jean Piaget (1896–1980), the creator of genetic epistemology, argued that positions of knowledge are grown into; that they are not given a priori, as in Kant's epistemology, but rather that knowledge structures develop through interaction. In Behavior and Evolution, Piaget said that "behaviour is the motor of evolution". His major publications spanned fifty years from the 1920s to the 1970s. Piaget's approach to constructivism was further developed in neo-Piagetian theories of cognitive development.

== See also ==
- Coherence therapy – A type of psychotherapy based on constructivist principles
- Distributed cognition – Psychologic theory
- Journal of Constructivist Psychology – Psychology journal
- Neuroconstructivism – Theory about how the brain sculpts itself and becomes specialized over time
- Prospection – Generation and evaluation of mental representations of possible futures
- Functional Ensemble of Temperament
