= Hostility =

Form of emotionally charged angry behavior

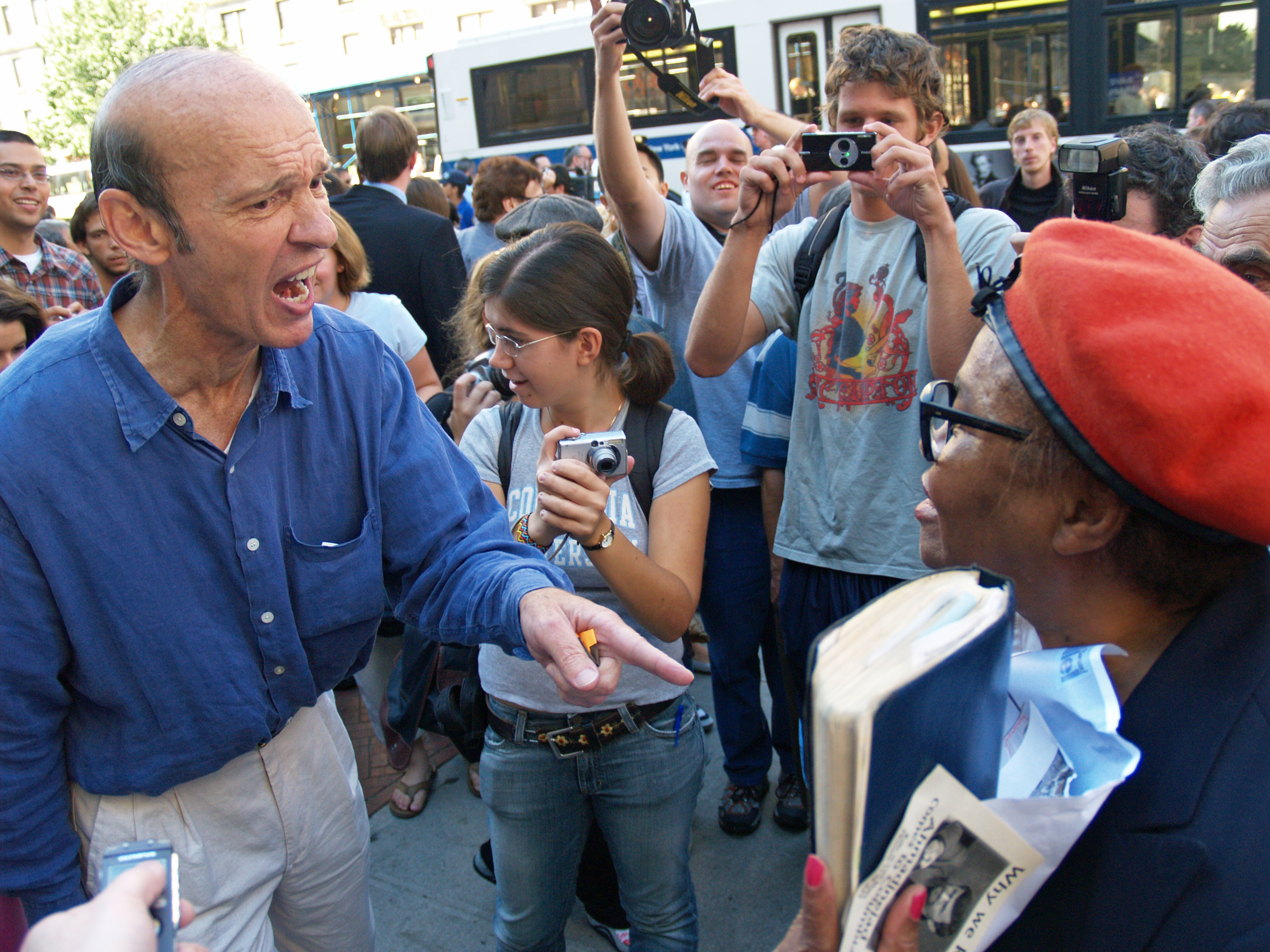
- Two people in a heated argument in New York City
- Specialty: Psychiatry

Hostility is seen as a form of emotionally charged aggressive behavior. In everyday speech, it is more commonly used as a synonym for anger and aggression.

It appears in several psychological theories. For instance it is a facet of neuroticism in the NEO PI, and forms part of personal construct psychology, developed by George Kelly.

== Hostility/hospitality ==
For hunter gatherers, every stranger from outside the small tribal group was a potential source of hostility. Similarly, in archaic Greece, every community was in a state of hostility, latent or overt, with every other community – something only gradually tempered by the rights and duties of hospitality.

In the 21st centary, we often find that hostillity and hospitalty compete against each other.

== Us/them ==
Robert Sapolsky argues that the tendency to form in-groups and out-groups of Us and Them, and to direct hostility at the latter, is inherent in humans. He also explores the possibility raised by Samuel Bowles that intra-group hostility is reduced when greater hostility is directed at Thems, something exploited by insecure leaders when they mobilise external conflicts so as to reduce in-group hostility towards themselves.

== Non-verbal indicators ==
Automatic mental functioning suggests that among universal human indicators of hostility are the grinding or gnashing of teeth, the clenching and shaking of fists, and grimacing. Desmond Morris would add stamping and thumping.

The All Blacks haka represents a ritualised set of such non-verbal signs of hostility.

== Kelly's model ==
In psychological terms, George Kelly considered hostility as the attempt to extort validating evidence from the environment to confirm types of social prediction, constructs, that have failed. Instead of reconstructing their constructs to meet disconfirmations with better predictions, the hostile person attempts to force or coerce the world to fit their view, even if this is a forlorn hope, and even if it entails emotional expenditure and/or harm to self or others.

In this sense hostility is a form of psychological extortion – an attempt to force reality to produce the desired feedback, even by acting out in bullying by individuals and groups in various social contexts, in order that preconceptions become ever more widely validated. Kelly's theory of cognitive hostility thus forms a parallel to Leon Festinger's view that there is an inherent impulse to reduce cognitive dissonance.

While challenging reality can be a useful part of life, and persistence in the face of failure can be a valuable trait (for instance in invention or discovery), in the case of hostility it is argued that evidence is not being accurately assessed but rather forced into a Procrustean mould in order to maintain one's belief systems and avoid having one's identity challenged. Instead it is claimed that hostility shows evidence of suppression or denial, and is "deleted" from awareness – unfavorable evidence which might suggest that a prior belief is flawed is to various degrees ignored and willfully avoided.

== See also ==
- Antisocial personality disorder
- Death drive
- Hate speech
- Narcissism of small differences
- Righteous indignation
- Cook–Medley hostility scale
