= Brian Gaines =

Brian Gaines may refer to:

- Brian J. Gaines (born 1981/82), American civil servant and politician
- Brian R. Gaines (born c. 1938), British scientist, engineer and professor
