= Rome, Kansas =

Rome, Kansas may refer to:

- Rome, Ellis County, Kansas — ghost town
- Rome, Sumner County, Kansas — unincorporated community
