= Journal of Constructivist Psychology =

Psychology journal

- Discipline: Psychology
- Language: English
- Edited by: Robert A. Neimeyer and Jonathan D. Raskin

Publication details
- Former name(s): International Journal of Personal Construct Psychology
- History: 1988–present
- Publisher: Taylor & Francis
- Frequency: Quarterly
- Impact factor: 0.909 (2018)

Standard abbreviations
- ISO 4: J. Constr. Psychol.

Indexing
- CODEN: JCPYES
- ISSN: 1072-0537
- LCCN: 94649697
- OCLC no.: 1056303359

Links
- Journal homepage; Online access; Online archive

The Journal of Constructivist Psychology is a quarterly peer-reviewed scientific journal covering psychology from the perspective of constructivism. It was established in 1988 as the International Journal of Personal Construct Psychology, obtaining its current name in 1994. Originally focused heavily on George Kelly's personal construct psychology, the journal was renamed to indicate that its scope had broadened to include other types of constructivist psychology. It is published by Taylor & Francis on behalf of the Constructivist Psychology Network and the International Society for Dialogical Science, the two organizations for which it is the official journal. The co-editors are Robert A. Neimeyer (Portland Institute for Loss and Transition) and Jonathan D. Raskin (SUNY New Paltz). The associate editors are Hubert J.M. Hermans, David Winter, and Clare Mason. According to the Journal Citation Reports, the journal has a 2020 impact factor of 1.100.
