= Guy André Boy =

French aerospace engineer

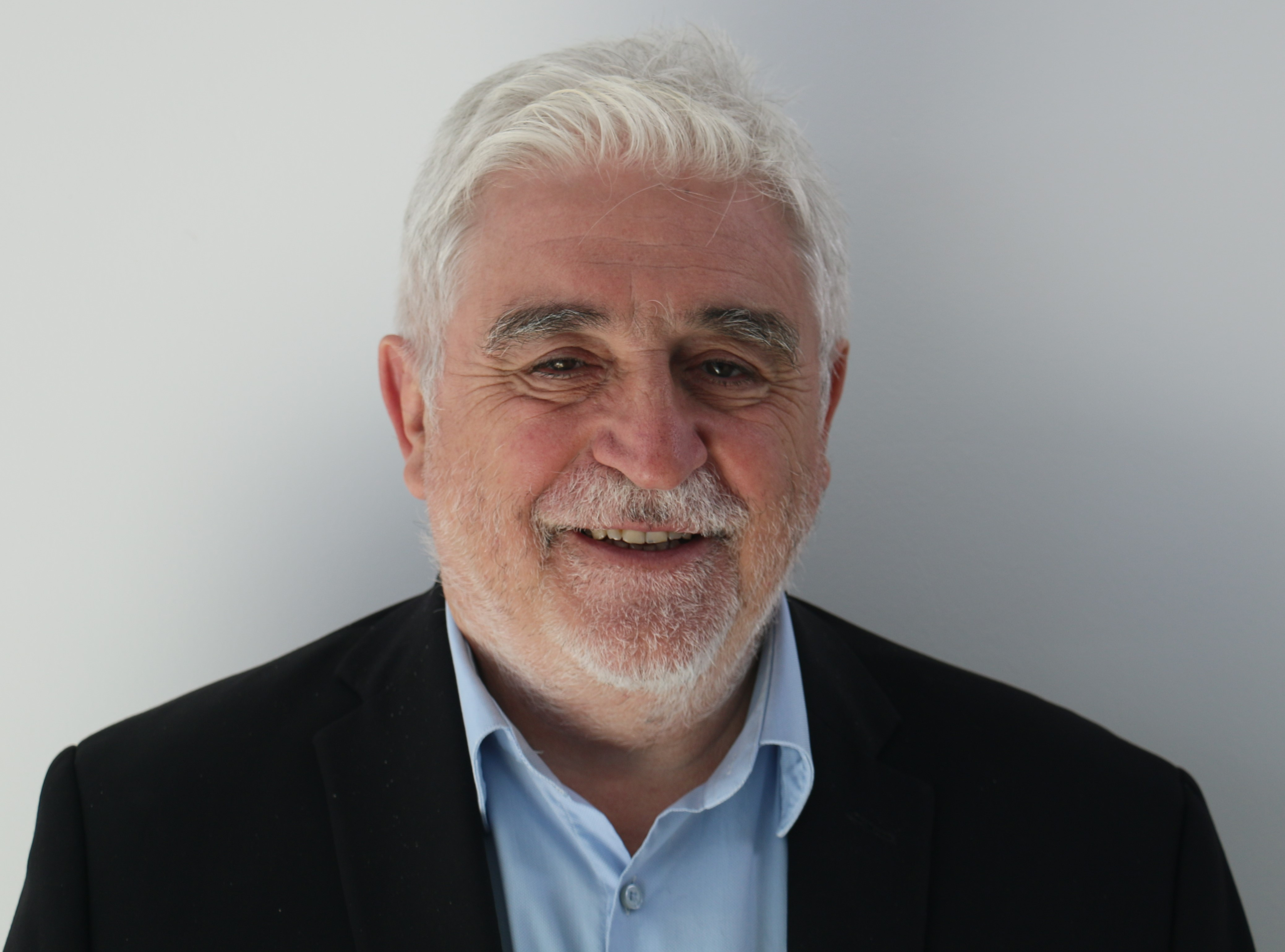
- Guy André Boy in 2022
- Born: May 25, 1952 (age 74); Toulouse, Haute-Garonne, France
- Education: Université Pierre and Marie Curie, Paris-Sorbonne University; ISAE-SUPAERO, Federal University of Toulouse
- Known for: Intelligent Assistant Systems, Cognitive Function Analysis, Group Elicitation Method, HCI-Aero conference series, Human-Centered design, Human Systems Integration
- Awards: Fellow of INCOSE; Fellow of the Air and Space Academy; Senior Member of the Association for Computing Machinery; Fellow of the International Academy of Astronautics.

Guy André Boy (born May 25, 1952) is a French and American scientist and engineer, Fellow of the International Council on Systems Engineering (INCOSE), the Air and Space Academy, and the International Academy of Astronautics. He was FlexTech Chair holder at CentraleSupélec (Paris-Saclay University) and ESTIA Institute of Technology (2019-2024), where he still teaches. He is also a visiting scholar at ISAE-SUPAERO and IRIT. He was a university professor and dean (2015–2017) at Florida Institute of Technology (FIT), where he created the Human-Centered Design Institute (HCDi) in 2010. He was senior research scientist at Florida Institute for Human and Machine Cognition (IHMC). He was Chief Scientist for Human-Centered Design at NASA Kennedy Space Center (KSC) from 2010 to 2016. He is known for his work on intelligent assistance, cognitive function analysis, human-centered design (HCD), orchestration of life-critical systems, tangible interactive systems, and human systems integration.

== Biography ==
Guy André Boy is a computer scientist, an aerospace and control engineer, and a cognitive scientist. He obtained his Masters (1977) and PhD (1980) in automation and systems design at École nationale supérieure de l'aéronautique et de l'espace (ISAE-SUPAERO), and his HDR (habilitation as research director) in Computer Science and Cognitive Science in 1992 at Pierre and Marie Curie University (Sorbonne University). His HDR thesis was titled Methods and Tools for Cognitive Human-Machine Interaction. His HDR Committee included Joëlle Coutaz, Pierre Falzon, Jean-Gabriel Ganascia, Georges Duvaut, Brian R. Gaines, Yves Kodratoff, and Marc Pelegrin. He also obtained a master's degree in cognitive psychology at the University of Toulouse in 1983.

His work mainly focuses on cognition, aerospace systems, and organizations since the late seventies, sharing his time between academia and industry. In the early eighties, he created and led the Cognitive Ergonomics Group at ONERA. In the late eighties, he created and headed the Advanced Interaction Media Group in the Artificial Intelligence Branch at NASA Ames Research Center, California.

He was Founder and president of the European Institute of Cognitive Sciences and Engineering (EURISCO) in France – a research institute of Airbus and Thales Group. He led EURISCO from its creation in 1992 until its closing in 2008. EURISCO was a multidisciplinary organization made up of cognitive and social scientists, computer scientists, engineers, and human factors specialists. It served students from various universities and engineering schools that were part of EURISCO's network of excellence. EURISCO focused strongly on its associations with the European aeronautical industry, research, and education. In 2004, Guy André Boy co-founded with Bernard Claverie the French Cognitive Engineering School and Center of Excellence ENSC: École Nationale Supérieure de Cognitique in Bordeaux, France. He taught cognitive engineering, human-centered design and Human Systems Integration in several universities including Florida Institute of Technology, École Polytechnique (Paris), ISAE-SUPAERO, INSA and ENAC (Toulouse), Paris Descartes University, Civil Aviation University of China (Tianjin), University of Valenciennes, ENSC, CentraleSupélec (Paris Saclay University) and ESTIA Institute of Technology.

In 2008, he joined IHMC as a senior research scientist. In 2009, he became university professor at FIT where he created and directed HCDi, which supports the FIT HCD Ph.D. and Master's programs. In 2010, he was appointed Chief Scientist for HCD at NASA KSC (under an Intergovernmental Personal Act). He advised for several NASA projects including the Virtual Camera concept and tool for planetary exploration, which he created and developed, space robotics, and the Glass Wall project for the renewal of launch control rooms. In 2013, he was nominated member of the Scientific Committee of European Commission's SESAR (Single European Sky Air Traffic Management) Joint Undertaking (SJU) Program, to provide advice to the SJU Executive Director, drafting of scientific opinions and provision of scientific advice.

Boy was inducted as a Fellow of the Air and Space Academy (Europe) in 2006, and a senior member of the Association for Computing Machinery in 2009.

== Work ==
Boy's early cognitive engineering research was on the first Glass cockpit, conducted with Airbus and the French aviation authorities (1980–1984). He actively contributed to developing human-centered methods for cockpit design and certification of the first two crewmen cockpits. This early leadership in cognitive engineering led to an award from the French Ministry of Defense that supported part of his work at NASA Ames, where he developed an operation assistant system to enhance the control of the Orbital Refueling System of the Space Shuttle (1984–1986). He coined the term "intelligent assistant systems" to denote systems that support human operators in safety-critical situations.

After two years in France (1987–1988), where he co-founded a start-up company on intelligent assistant systems, Dialogics/Dialexis, he returned to NASA Ames to work on electronic documentation for the Space Station Freedom (1989–1991). During this period, influenced by Douglas Englebart, who he worked with for a while, he developed an approach mixing hypertext and machine learning, leading to a system called Computer Integrated Documentation. This work led to a major publication on context-sensitive indexing.

Back to France, he was nominated as a leading expert in Information Society and Technology for the European Commission. He served as an expert for the European Space Agency to establish the area of human-machine interaction and artificial intelligence (1991–1992). Creating and developing EURISCO, he became a legal expert for aircraft accident investigations (1992–1994). He then started new investigations in cockpit design and produced the Cognitive Function Analysis (CFA) method that was extensively used in industry to design safety-critical systems. Commercial aircraft cockpits became more computerized and generated more studies in human-computer interaction (HCI). He combined HCI and artificial Intelligence approaches not only in the aerospace domain but also in education through the use of software agents. He also created the Group Elicitation Method (GEM) that is used for knowledge elicitation in HCD, and more specifically in participatory design. He helped restructure Air France at the highest level using GEM. GEM was used in many industrial settings, e.g., Airbus, Nokia, Daimler, Toyota Europe, and in several European Integrated Projects funded by the European Commission. He collaborated on making the Handbook of Human-Computer Interaction with a chapter on knowledge elicitation for the design of software agents. He wrote an introductory text under the auspices of UNESCO on theories of human cognition to better understand the co-adaptation of people and technology in knowledge management, organizational intelligence and learning, and complexity. He coordinated the French Handbook of Cognitive Engineering: A Human-Computer Interaction and Cognition (Traité d'Ingénierie Cognitive: IHM et Cognition).

He then contributed to developing the field of HCI in France and was Co-Founder of AFIHM, the French national equivalent of Association for Computing Machinery SIGCHI. He co-founded the first French ACM SIGCHI local chapter in Toulouse. He was the first French CHI paper Co-Chair (Inter-CHI 1993) with Jakob Nielsen, and was elected Executive Vice Chair of ACM SIGCHI (1995–1999), making him the first European ACM SIGCHI top executive. This service to the HCI community, together with Richard Anderson, contributed to the creation of several local chapters worldwide. Within the human-computer interaction community, he collaborated with colleagues who were influential throughout his professional life, including Jeff Bradshaw, John Carroll, Jonathan Grudin, Don Norman, Terry Winograd, among many others. He was Chair of the INCOSE Human-Systems Integration Working Group (2015-2024). In 2021 he was named Fellow of the International Council on Systems Engineering (INCOSE). This and his contributions to the field of study have made him recognized as a exceptional contributor, Which only 80 individuals have ever been named and he became just the second in France to be recognized as this.

TEDx talk, USA, 2012

He also founded the HCI-Aero (Human-Computer Interaction in Aerospace) conference series in cooperation with ACM-SIGCHI, the International Ergonomics Association and the Air and Space Academy (Program Chair, 1998-2016). HCI-Aero conferences followed the Human-Machine Interaction and Artificial Intelligence in Aerospace conference series, also created by Boy (1986–1995). HCI-Aero conferences have become a major reference in the field of HCI in Aerospace (full papers are indexed in the ACM Digital Library). He also created the Technical Committee on Human-Factors and Ergonomics of the International Ergonomics Association (IEA), which he leads since 2008. He scientifically led two main projects regarding safety and human-computer interaction in aeronautics: DIVA, a European project that tried to understand aircrew's awareness of both aircraft internal states and external situations using cognitive function analysis (1998–2001); and PAUSA, a French national project on authority distribution in air traffic management that contributed to the emergence of the Orchestra model for socio-cognitive analysis of multi-agent life-critical systems (2006–2008). This model and the development of HCDi led to the publication of the book, Orchestrating Human-Centered Design where he promotes education and training of leaders who understand technology, organizations, and people (the TOP model). This book presents a humanist approach to design, engineering, and more globally education. With Jen Narkevicius, he proposed a unification of HCD and systems engineering for a better definition of human-systems integration. He extended this HCD research effort on safety-critical systems to nuclear power plant control and management with two of his Ph.D. students. His research work is globally summarized in the discussion on cognitive engineering he had with Jean Pinet, a former Experimental Test Pilot of Concorde, and his dedication to automation, aerospace and education. Influenced by the work of Hiroshi Iishii, he proposed the shift from automation to tangible interactive objects. He has participated in NASA Blue Sky Study Groups for the "Small Pressurized Rover," (later called the "Lunar Electric Rover"). In 2012, he was the director of the International Space University Space Studies Program FIT/NASA-KSC local organizing committee and the chair of the team project of "what space can contribute to global STEM education." The same year, he gave a TEDx talk on "Human-Centered Design: the STEAM Renaissance". He continues to work on risk-taking and wrote an interdisciplinary book on the topic published by the Air and Space Academy.

== Selected works ==
Books (in English)

- Boy, G.A. (Ed.) (2026). Handbook of Sociotechnical Systems: A Human Systems Integration Approach. Boca Raton, FL: CRC Press. ISBN 978-1-0411-2228-9.
- Boy, G.A.; Quillerou, E. (2022). Risk-Taking, Prevention and Design: A Cross-Fertilization Approach. Boca Raton, FL: CRC Press. ISBN 978-1-0032-2160-9.
- Boy, G.A. (2021). Design for Flexibility: A Human Systems Integration Approach. Switzerland: Springer Nature: ISBN 978-3-030-76391-6.
- Boy, G.A. (2020). Human Systems Integration: From Virtual to Tangible. CRC Press – Taylor & Francis Group, USA. ISBN 978-0-3673-5773-3.
- Boy, G.A. (2016). Tangible Interactive Systems. New York: Springer: ISBN 978-3-319-30269-0.
- Boy, Guy (2013). Orchestrating Human-Centered Design. New York: Springer. ISBN 978-1-4471-4338-3.
- Boy, G.A. (Ed.) (2011). Handbook of Human-Machine Interaction: A Human-Centered Design Approach. Boca Raton, FL: CRC Press. ISBN 978-1-1380-7582-5.
- Boy, Guy (1998). Cognitive Function Analysis. Stamford, Conn.: Ablex. ISBN 978-1-5675-0376-0.
- Boy, Guy (1991). Intelligent Assistant Systems (Knowledge-Based Systems). San Diego, Calif.: Academic Press. ISBN 978-0-1212-1245-2.

Books (in French)

- Boy, G.A. (2010). La Prise de Risque: Une Nécessité humaine qu'il faut gérer (also published in English as Risk taking: a human necessity that needs to be managed). Air and Space Academy, France.
- Boy, G.A. & Pinet J. (2008). L'être technologique (The Technological Being). L'Harmattan, Paris, France.
- Boy, G.A. (2003). L'Ingénierie Cognitive: Interaction Homme-Machine et Cognition (The French Handbook of Cognitive Engineering). In "Le Traité de Sciences Cognitives." Hermes Sciences, Lavoisier, Paris. ISBN 978-2-7462-0571-0.
- Boy, G.A. (1988). Assistance à l'Opérateur: Une approche de l'intelligence artificielle. Teknea, Toulouse.

== Awards ==
- (2022) Fellow, full member, of the International Academy of Astronautics.
- (2021) Fellow of the International Council on Systems Engineering (INCOSE).
- (2009) ACM Senior Member Award.
- (2006) Fellow of the Air and Space Academy.
