= Jackson Township, Sumner County, Kansas =

Township in Sumner County, Kansas, U.S.

Jackson Township
- Township
- Location within Sumner County
- Coordinates: 37.169932°N 97.415804°W
- Country: United States
- State: Kansas
- County: Sumner
- Established: 1874

Government
  - Trustee: Gary Theurer

Area
  - Total: 36.348 sq mi (94.14 km^{2})
  - Land: 36.34 sq mi (94.1 km^{2})
  - Water: 0.008 sq mi (0.021 km^{2}) 0.02%

Population (2020)
  - Total: 117
  - Density: 3.22/sq mi (1.24/km^{2})
- Time zone: UTC-6 (CST)
  - Summer (DST): UTC-5 (CDT)
- Area code: 620
- GNIS feature ID: 470327

Jackson Township is a township in Sumner County, Kansas, United States. As of the 2020 census, its population was 117.

== History ==
Jackson Township was established in 1874 from part of South Haven Township. In 1879, part of Downs Township was created from part of Jackson Township.

== Geography ==
Jackson Township covers an area of 36.348 square miles (94.14 km^{2}), with 0.02% being water. Snyder Creek flows through it.

=== Communities ===
- Rome

=== Adjacent townships ===
Wellington Township, Sumner County
Osborne Township, Sumner County	northwest	north	northeast	Avon Township, Sumner County
Downs Township, Sumner County	west	self	east	Greene Township, Sumner County
Falls Township, Sumner County	southwest	south	southeast	Guelph Township, Sumner County
South Haven Township, Sumner County

== Transportation ==
=== Major highways ===
- US-81

== Demographics ==
As of the 2020 census, the township had a population of 117, giving a population density of 3.22 people per square mile (1.24 people/km^{2}). The racial makeup of the township was 87.2% White, 0.9% Black or African American, and 12.0% from two or more races. Hispanics or Latinos of any race were 2.6% of the population.

The 2020–2024 American Community Survey estimated that the township contained 20 households and 20 housing units.
