= Brendan Maher (psychologist) =

British psychology professor and researcher (1924-2009)

Brendan A. Maher
- Born: 31 October 1924; Lancashire, England
- Died: 17 March 2009 (aged 84); Weston, Massachusetts
- Awards: Joseph Zubin Award (1998)
- Scientific career
- Fields: Psychology
- Thesis: Personality Factors and Experimental Conditions as Determinants of Rigidity in Problem Solving Behavior (1954)
- Doctoral advisor: George Kelly

Brendan Arnold Maher (31 October 1924 – 17 March 2009) was a psychology professor at Harvard University who pioneered the scientific study of psychology in the laboratory, and laid the groundwork for the study of psychology and its relationship to genetics. Maher was most interested in human psychopathology, especially schizophrenia. One of his major contributions was to introduce laboratory experimentation strategies to research of this mental illness. He is widely credited with introducing the one-factor approach to understanding monothematic delusions: that the delusions arise from rational or unimpaired deliberation and belief forming, only based on impaired or incorrect perceptual or experiential data. Maher also mentored many students through their own research projects at Harvard, Ohio State University, Northwestern University, Louisiana State University, University of Wisconsin, and Brandeis University, where he served as Dean of the Faculty.

== See also ==
- Martha Mitchell effect
