= Cook–Medley hostility scale =

Psychological test

Cook-Medley Hostility Scale (Ho)
- Purpose: Measure individual hostility
- MeSH: D006791

The Cook–Medley Hostility Scale (Ho) is a standard in psychology designed to measure an individual's personality and temperament, specifically degrees of hostility. Initially developed as a scale for the Minnesota Multiphasic Personality Inventory (MMPI), scores from the hostility scale represent the individual's disposition towards cynicism and chronic hate. Scores from the scale have been used by studies as a predictor of the measured individual's risk of developing certain health problems as well as the success of their interpersonal relationships.

Published by Walter W. Cook and Donald M. Medley in 1954, the scale has found extensive applications in defining hostility and aggression as a potential factor contributing to health and mortality. The scale's validity and reliability as a diagnosis, however, is still considered with a certain degree of controversy.

== History ==
The Cook–Medley Hostility Scale was developed by psychologists Walter W. Cook of the University of Minnesota and Donald M. Medley of Indiana University.

The endeavor was approached with the initial aim of creating a scale that would function as a measure of an individual's interpersonal and social skills, as it was believed that such a scale would find use in identifying individuals who would flourish best in rapport-based work environments. A previous MMPI-based study from the University of Minnesota had shown that the success or failure of teacher-student rapports could be attributed to certain psychological and behavioral factors. In their study, Cook and Medley narrowed the determining factor of the teacher's success down to their inclinations towards hostility.

Following the creation of a preliminary Ho scale, consisting of 77 items from the MMPI associated with determining hostility-related tendencies, application of the scale revealed it to be a consistent predictor of a teacher's rapport with their pupils. Teachers who scored higher on the Ho scale had poorer relationships with a correlation between high Ho scores and poor interpersonal rapports.

Validated by the success of this study, Cook and Medley published the final 50-item hostility scale in 1954, presenting it as a measure of an individual's inclination to distrust and dislike others, able to find use in rapport-based studies as a predictor of interpersonal success.

Since its publication, various studies have consistently applied the scale in the medical and psychological field. Many have found ways of streamlining the scale further by extrapolating the core traits the scale's items test for.

== Scale composition ==
The original Cook–Medley Hostility Scale contains 50 items derived from the MMPI. These items are true or false statements selected for their to target and elicit responses that allow for a gauge of the individual's personality in relation to level of hostility. Examples of such statements include:

- "I would certainly enjoy beating a crook at his own game."
- "I have often met people who were supposed to be experts who were no better than I."
- "When someone does me a wrong I feel I should pay him back if I can, just for the principle of the thing."

These items are delivered to the recipient in the style of a response-based questionnaire. A score is tallied each time the recipients' responses suggest a disposition towards hostility. Relatively high scores on the scale when compared to the mean are characteristic of an individual prone to hostility while average or lower scores indicate a non-hostile individual.

The hostility tested by the Ho scale is defined by Cook and Medley to refer to the individual's measure of "chronic hate and anger". Specifically, the hostile individual is characterized by a poor and highly critical perception of other people, often fueled by the belief that others are fundamentally immoral, dishonest and cruel. They are of the mindset that others ought to be subjected to suffering and punishment for these perceived flaws. In later studies, this definition of hostility was improved to include the individual's tendency towards cynicism and paranoia, especially towards others.

A study in 1989 further derived that the 50 items targeted six sub-traits in the individual: "cynicism, hostile attributions, hostile affect, aggressive responding, social avoidance and other".

== Scoring and interpretation ==
As the Ho scale fundamentally aims to test for anger and conflict-centered personality traits, scores from the scale can be interpreted to have implications on the measured individual's societal integration and psychological well-being. The original Ho scale was developed to predict the success of interpersonal relationships, to be used in selecting for more harmonious relations in work-based environments, however it has also been most extensively used in medical diagnosis.

=== Success of interpersonal relationships ===
Individuals who score higher on the Ho scale are often reported to do poorly in situations that require the use of interpersonal skills and hence experience poorer rapports in both external and domestic contexts. This correlation is explained to be the result of the hostile individual's inclinations towards aggression-prone responding, distrust and disdain of others, as such behaviors tend to escalate disagreements and conflict and manifest in antagonistic attitudes.

The original Cook–Medley study had shown a correlation between scores on the scale and the individual's interpersonal success in a work-based environment. When teachers were surveyed on their perceptions of the pupils they taught, the hostile teachers had significantly poor views of their students, believing them to be unscrupulous, while they themselves believed themselves to be morally correct. Results from studies surveying marital relationships using the Ho scale have revealed those with high scores of hostility tend to be unhappy with their marriage and experience more marital conflicts.

=== Predictor of mental health ===
Scores from the Ho scale can be predictors of the individual's overall mental health. It has been observed that individuals with higher Ho scores tend to experience more negative life-events and hassles, whether as a product of their hostile temperament or otherwise. Furthermore, higher-scoring individuals are reported to have limited social support networks to fall back on following these negative instances, leaving them more susceptible to stress. These factors accumulate to an increased susceptibility to mental illnesses. Studies using the Ho scale have found a significant correlation between high levels of hostility and mental illnesses such as depression, anxiety, and general dysphoria.

It is concluded that higher scoring individuals on the Ho scale are more susceptible to poor mental health and at an increased risk of developing mental illnesses than a lower scoring individual.

=== Risk of coronary diseases ===
Applications of the Ho scale feature most prominently in studies of coronary diseases. Hostility and anger have long been speculated to be enablers of coronary diseases, the levels of aggression characteristic of chronically hostile individuals have been found to factor in hypertension. In follow-up studies, the Ho scale has been utilized in several of the resulting follow-up studies, in which it was reported that higher Ho scores significantly corresponded with a higher risk of premature coronary disease. This has been linked to the hostile individual's tendency to turn to substance abuse, alcoholism and smoking as coping mechanisms. These detrimental lifestyle choices all tend towards increasing the individual's susceptibility towards high-blood pressure and other blood-and-vessel-related problems leading to an increased risk of coronary diseases. Ho scores are by association effective in predicting those liable to contracting coronary heart disease.

== Significance and validity ==
Although the Cook–Medley Scale has been recorded to find use across several studies as a predictor of health, applications across the field have yielded mixed results with regards to validity of prediction. Journal publications which have found success using the Ho scale as a predictor acknowledge that there are issues of reliability and consistency. There is a general consensus across studies the Ho scale requires further applications and fine-tuning for it find optimal validity.

As a predictor of health risks, the original 50-item scaled has been found to be inefficient. One study has identified 3 of the 6 targeted sub-traits to have the most significant impact on an individual's health, and has refined the scale to utilize only the scores from cynicism, hostile affect and aggressive responding. By doing so, these scores have managed to produces more streamlined results and more prominent correlations. Other studies have been able to narrow the scale down to 20 items.

There were initially concerns that the Ho scale, like other similar psychometric scales, was in fact measuring general dysphoria and neuroticism rather than the aggression and hostility it claimed to be, however articles have been published with studies showing that the discriminant produced by the Ho scale are far more significant in relation to anger and aggression than to dysphoria or neuroticism. From the studies, the scale is presented to be calibrated around hostility and is considered by the article to be a valid measure of such.
