= Angela O'Donnell =

American psychologist

Angela M. O'Donnell is an American educational psychologist and a professor at Rutgers University, who has contributed to the understanding of collaborative learning (O'Donnell, Hmelo-Silver, & Erkens, 2006), and is the co-author of a widely used introductory textbook (O'Donnell, Reeve, & Smith, 2007). She is a member of the editorial review boards of Contemporary Educational Psychology, Educational Psychologist, Educational Psychology Review, the Journal of Experimental Education, and the Journal of Educational Psychology. She is a past special interest group (SIG) chair in the American Educational Research Association (AERA).

== Publications ==
=== Textbooks ===
- O'Donnell, A. M., Reeve, J. M., & Smith, J. K. (2007). Educational psychology: Reflection for action. Hoboken, NJ: John Wiley & Sons.
- O'Donnell, A. M., Hmelo-Silver, C., & Erkens, G. (2006). Collaborative learning, reasoning, and technology. Mahwah, NJ: Lawrence Erlbaum.
- O'Donnell, A. M., & King, A. (1999). Cognitive perspectives on peer learning. Mahwah, NJ: Lawrence Erlbaum.

=== Articles and chapters ===
- "Scripted Cooperation in Student Dyads: A Method for Analyzing and Enhancing" (1992, with Donald F. Dansereau)
- "Learning from peers: Beyond the rhetoric of positive results" (1994, with James O'Kelly)
- "The Structure of Discourse in Collaborative Learning" (2000, with Clark A. Chinn and Theresa S. Jinks)
- "Knowledge Maps as Scaffolds for Cognitive Processing" (2002, with Donald F. Dansereau and Richard H. Hall)
