= Memory consolidation =

Category of memory stabilizing processes

The line processes to make information memory

Memory consolidation is a process in the brain that stabilizes newly learned information, allowing the memory to be stored long-term. A memory trace is the biological change in neural circuits that occurs during learning. Memory consolidation is essential for learning as it allows experiences to be transformed into stable long-term memories that can guide future behavior.

Consolidation is divided into two main processes, synaptic consolidation and systems consolidation. Synaptic consolidation occurs rapidly on a small scale in the individual synapses within the first few hours of learning. Systems consolidation occurs on a larger scale and involves gradual reorganization and reduced reliance on the hippocampus and increased involvement of cortical networks over a period of weeks to years.

These processes involve molecular and cellular changes that stabilize neural representations, referred to as a neural ensemble (engram).

A third process, reconsolidation, has been proposed, in which previously consolidated memories can become unstable again after retrieval and may need to be updated before being re-stabilized.

== History ==
Memory consolidation was first referred to in the writings of the renowned Roman teacher of rhetoric Quintilian, who noted that memory improves over time. In the late 19th century, German researchers Müller and Alfons Pilzecker formally introduced the idea of consolidation, proposing memory takes time to fixate and stabilize.

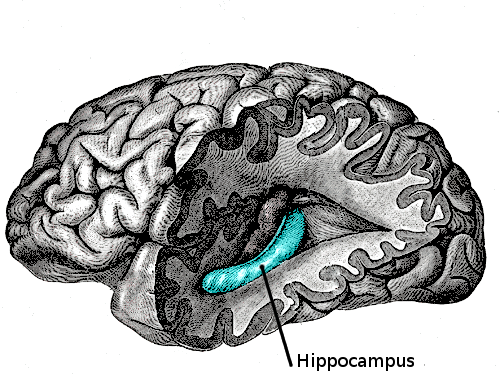
Lateral view of the hippocampus which is located in the medial temporal lobe

Systematic studies of anterograde amnesia started to emerge in the 1960s and 1970s. The case of Henry Molaison, formerly known as patient H.M., became a landmark in studies of memory as it relates to amnesia and the removal of the hippocampal zone and sparked massive interest in the study of brain lesions and their effect on memory. Research into other patients with resections of the MTL have shown a positive relationship between the degree of memory impairment and the extent of MTL removal which points to a temporal gradient in the consolidating nature of the MTL. These findings helped establish the modern theories of memory consolidation and its underlying neural mechanisms.

== Synaptic consolidation ==
Synaptic consolidation is the earlier phase of memory consolidation in which newly formed memories are stabilized by changes occurring at individual synapses. This process occurs within minutes to hours after learning and is thought to support long-term memory formation. Late-phase LTP is the long-lasting increase in synaptic strength following repeated stimulation and is thought to be the cellular process underlying synaptic consolidation.

=== Standard model ===
The standard model of synaptic consolidation suggests that learning activates signaling pathways inside the neurons which change gene expression and protein synthesis. These changes result in lasting alteration of synaptic proteins, as well as synaptic remodeling and growth. Immediately after learning, these alterations are vulnerable to disruptions which is why newly formed memories are thought to be fragile initially. Disruptions caused by specific drugs, antibodies and gross physical trauma can block the effects of synaptic consolidation.

=== Synaptic plasticity ===
Synaptic consolidation is supported by multiple forms of synaptic plasticity. Synaptic plasticity is largely defined as the ability of a neural connection to change in strength over time due to exposure to different levels of stimuli. Two major forms of synaptic plasticity include long-term potentiation which strengthens synaptic connections and long-term depression which weakens synaptic connections. These synaptic changes are thought to underlie the initial formation of memory at the cellular level.

=== Long-term potentiation ===
LTP is the prolonged strengthening of synaptic transmission following repeated stimulation. LTP is widely considered a key mechanism in memory and learning because of its ability to strengthen communication between neurons.

=== Structural plasticity ===
Structural plasticity refers to large-scale changes in brain structure, encompassing changes in neuron shape, supporting cell shape, and formation of new cells. Because memory consolidation involves the long-term stabilization of neural circuits, these large-scale structural changes are thought to contribute to the persistence and organization of consolidated memories. The following is a brief list of some of the most significant mechanisms of plasticity in the brain. Structural plasticity alters the physical architecture of neural circuits over a long period of time and thus is thought to complement synaptic changes.

==== Neurogenesis ====
Neurogenesis is the process of making new neurons. It is most prominent during development but it has been proposed that newly generated neurons in the hippocampus may support certain forms of memory consolidation—particularly those involving long-term retention.

==== Synaptic remodeling ====
Dendritic spine remodeling is a key mechanism of structural plasticity. Alterations in the number and shape of dendritic spines have been associated with memory and learning and are believed to play a key role in converting transient synaptic modifications into long-lasting memory traces.

Synaptogenesis and synaptic pruning also play a role in structural plasticity. Synaptogenesis is the process by which two neurons form a new synapse, and synaptic pruning is the process by which a synaptic connection between two neurons is eliminated. This allows for a high level of variability in neural pathways as they can be subject to change based on different conditions. By acting together as a mechanism that mediates overall synaptic changes, synaptogenesis and pruning can modify how information is routed and stored over time, thereby influencing the long-term consolidation of memories.

==== Myelination ====
Myelination is the process with which neuronal axons are insulated by myelin which can also change over time. Current studies have established that myelin has a high rate of change in the brain, allowing the brain to optimize functioning speeds based on particular needs. Systems-level memory consolidation depends on coordinated communication across multiple brain regions, thus, activity-dependent changes in myelination are thought to improve the timing and efficiency of these networks, contributing to some of the long-term stabilization of memories.

=== Spacing effect ===
The spacing effect refers to the idea that information is better retained when the learning is distributed over time rather than cramming into a single session. This is thought to enhance memory consolidation as it allows for more time for synaptic and molecular processes such as protein synthesis to occur between the learning sessions and thereby strengthen long-term memory.

=== Protein synthesis ===
Protein synthesis has shown to play an important role in the formation of new memories. Studies have shown that protein synthesis inhibitors administered after learning weaken memory, suggesting that protein synthesis is required for memory consolidation. Additionally, reports have suggested that the effects of protein synthesis inhibitors also inhibit LTP. However, other results have shown that protein synthesis may not in fact be necessary for memory consolidation, as it has been found that the formation of memories can withstand vast amounts of protein synthesis inhibition, suggesting that its role may not be absolute.

== Systems consolidation ==
Systems consolidation is the later phase of memory consolidation in which memories are reorganized across brain regions over time. Newly formed memories are first encoded in the hippocampus and then are gradually reorganized across cortical networks in a more permanent form of storage. Systems consolidation is a slow dynamic process which occurs over days to years as a gradual shift from hippocampus-dependent to hippocampus-independent memory storage.

Systems consolidation is proposed to be involved in repeated reactivation of memory traces especially during sleep. The reactivations help strengthen the connections between cortical regions thereby gradually reducing reliance on the hippocampus. Over time, this process supports stabilization and long-term memory storage.

=== Standard model ===
The standard model of systems consolidation, proposed by Squire and Alvarez (1995), suggests that newly acquired memories are initially encoded in the hippocampus and cortical regions. In this model, the hippocampus temporarily stores memories because the synapses are able to change quickly whereas the neocortical synapses change more slowly over time. Over time, the repeated reactivation strengthens the cortico-cortical connections and therefore reduces reliance on the hippocampus. This leads to long-term memories becoming increasingly supported by neocortical networks.

=== Multiple trace theory ===
Multiple trace theory (MTT) proposes that the hippocampus remains involved in the storage and retrieval of episodic memories regardless of age. MTT argues that episodic memories continue to rely on hippocampal networks. In contrast, the standard model suggests memories become independent of the hippocampus over time. However, semantic memories can be established in structures apart from the hippocampal system, such as the neocortex, in the process of consolidation.

==== Criticisms ====
Haist, Gore, and Mao, sought to examine the temporal nature of consolidation within the hippocampus to test MTT against the standard view. They found that the hippocampus does not substantially contribute to the recollection of remote memories after a period of a few years.

=== Semantic vs. episodic memory ===
Nadel and Moscovitch argued semantic memory and episodic memory need to be distinguished as relying on two different memory systems. Amnesic patients with hippocampal damage show traces of memories and this has been used as support for the standard model because it suggests that memories are retained apart from the hippocampal system. Nadel and Moscovitch argue that these retained memories have lost the richness of experience and exist as depersonalized events that have been semanticized over time. They suggest that this instead provides support for their notion that episodic memories rely significantly on the hippocampal system but semantic memories can be established elsewhere in the brain and survive hippocampal damage.

=== Sleep consolidation ===
Sleep has been proposed to play a role in systems consolidation as it is thought to support long-term stabilization of memories. During sleep, newly encoded memories are stabilized and reorganized with the help of the interactions between the neocortex and the hippocampus.

== Reconsolidation ==
Memory reconsolidation highlights the dynamic nature of memory, suggesting that recalling previously consolidated memories can make them temporarily unstable thus open to modification. It is a distinct process that allows existing memories to be maintained, strengthened and updated over time, as they must be re-stabilized to persist. Reconsolidation is considered different from initial consolidation, despite its overlap in function (e.g. storage) and its mechanisms (e.g. protein synthesis). While widely supported, reconsolidation is an area of ongoing research and debate regarding mechanisms and functional significance. Furthermore, studies have shown that when reconsolidation is disrupted, memory expression can be altered, particularly in fear-related learning paradigms. A clinical application of reconsolidation is Memrec, a treatment approach that combines brief fear memory reactivation with propranolol administration.

=== Criticisms ===
Some studies have supported the reconsolidation theory, while others have failed to demonstrate disruption of consolidated memory after retrieval. These inconsistencies suggest that reconsolidation may depend on specific conditions and thus remains an area of ongoing debate.

== See also ==
- Atkinson–Shiffrin memory model
- Coherence therapy
- Engram
- Patient HM
- Sharp wave–ripple complexes
