= Repertory grid =

Interviewing method based on personal construct theory of personality

The repertory grid is an interviewing technique which uses nonparametric factor analysis to determine an idiographic measure of personality. It was devised by George Kelly in around 1955 and is based on his personal construct theory of personality.

== Introduction ==
The repertory grid is a technique for identifying the ways that a person construes (interprets or gives meaning to) his or her experience. It provides information from which inferences about personality can be made, but it is not a personality test in the conventional sense. It is underpinned by the personal construct theory developed by George Kelly, first published in 1955.

A grid consists of four parts:

1. A topic: it is about some part of the person's experience.
2. A set of elements, which are examples or instances of the topic. Working as a clinical psychologist, Kelly was interested in how his clients construed people in the roles they adopted towards the client, and so, originally, such terms as "my father", "my mother", "an admired friend" and so forth were used. Since then, the grid has been used in much wider settings (educational, occupational, organisational) and so any well-defined set of words, phrases, or even brief behavioral vignettes can be used as elements. For example, to see how a person construes the purchase of a car, a list of vehicles within that person's price range could be a set of elements.
3. A set of constructs. These are the basic terms that the client uses to make sense of the elements, and are always expressed as a contrast. Thus the meaning of "good" depends on whether you intend to say "good versus poor", as if you were construing a theatrical performance, or "good versus evil", as if you were construing the moral or ontological status of some more fundamental experience.
4. A set of ratings of elements on constructs. Each element is positioned between the two extremes of the construct using a 5- or 7-point rating scale system; this is done repeatedly for all the constructs that apply; and thus its meaning to the client is modeled, and statistical analysis varying from simple counting, to more complex multivariate analysis of meaning, is made possible.

Constructs are regarded as personal to the client, who is psychologically similar to other people depending on the extent to which they would tend to use similar constructs, and similar ratings, in relating to a particular set of elements.

The client is asked to consider the elements three at a time, and to identify a way in which two of the elements might be seen as alike, but distinct from, contrasted to, the third. For example, in considering a set of people as part of a topic dealing with personal relationships, a client might say that the element "my father" and the element "my boss" are similar because they are both fairly tense individuals, whereas the element "my wife" is different because she is "relaxed". And so we identify one construct that the individual uses when thinking about people: whether they are "tense as distinct from relaxed". In practice, good grid interview technique would delve a little deeper and identify some more behaviorally explicit description of "tense versus relaxed". All the elements are rated on the construct, further triads of elements are compared and further constructs elicited, and the interview would continue until no further constructs are obtained.

== Using the repertory grid ==
Careful interviewing to identify what the individual means by the words initially proposed, using a 5-point rating system could be used to characterize the way in which a group of fellow-employees are viewed on the construct "keen and committed versus energies elsewhere", a 1 indicating that the left pole of the construct applies ("keen and committed") and a 5 indicating that the right pole of the construct applies ("energies elsewhere"). On being asked to rate all of the elements, our interviewee might reply that Tom merits a 2 (fairly keen and committed), Mary a 1 (very keen and committed), and Peter a 5 (his energies are very much outside the place of employment). The remaining elements (another five people, for example) are then rated on this construct.

Typically (and depending on the topic) people have a limited number of genuinely different constructs for any one topic: 6 to 16 are common when they talk about their job or their occupation, for example. The richness of people's meaning structures comes from the many different ways in which a limited number of constructs can be applied to individual elements. A person may indicate that Tom is fairly keen, very experienced, lacks social skills, is a good technical supervisor, can be trusted to follow complex instructions accurately, has no sense of humour, will always return a favour but only sometimes help his co-workers, while Mary is very keen, fairly experienced, has good social and technical supervisory skills, needs complex instructions explained to her, appreciates a joke, always returns favours, and is very helpful to her co-workers: these are two very different and complex pictures, using just 8 constructs about a person's co-workers.

Important information can be obtained by including self-elements such as "Myself as I am now"; "Myself as I would like to be" among other elements, where the topic permits.

== Analysis of results ==
A single grid can be analysed for both content (eyeball inspection) and structure (cluster analysis, principal component analysis, and a variety of structural indices relating to the complexity and range of the ratings being the chief techniques used). Sets of grids are dealt with using one or other of a variety of content analysis techniques. A range of associated techniques can be used to provide precise, operationally defined expressions of an interviewee's constructs, or a detailed expression of the interviewee's personal values, and all of these techniques are used in a collaborative way. The repertory grid is emphatically not a standardized "psychological test"; it is an exercise in the mutual negotiation of a person's meanings.

The repertory grid has found favour among both academics and practitioners in a great variety of fields because it provides a way of describing people's construct systems (loosely, understanding people's perceptions) without prejudging the terms of reference—a kind of personalized grounded theory.

Unlike a conventional rating-scale questionnaire, it is not the investigator but the interviewee who provides the constructs on which a topic is rated. Market researchers, trainers, teachers, guidance counsellors, new product developers, sports scientists, and knowledge capture specialists are among the users who find the technique (originally developed for use in clinical psychology) helpful.

== Relationship to other tools ==
In the book Personal Construct Methodology, researchers Brian R. Gaines and Mildred L.G. Shaw noted that they "have also found concept mapping and semantic network tools to be complementary to repertory grid tools and generally use both in most studies" but that they "see less use of network representations in PCP [personal construct psychology] studies than is appropriate". They encouraged practitioners to use semantic network techniques in addition to the repertory grid.

== See also ==
- Graph (abstract data type)
- Implicit Relational Assessment Procedure
- Knowledge representation and reasoning
- Q methodology
- Tree (data structure)
