= Wellington USD 353 =

Public school district in Wellington, Kansas

Address
- 221 S. Washington Ave. Wellington, Kansas, 67152; United States
- Coordinates: 37°15′50″N 97°23′51″W

District information
- Type: Public
- Grades: K to 12
- Schools: 6

Other information
- Website: usd353.com

Wellington USD 353 is a public unified school district headquartered in Wellington, Kansas, United States. The district includes the communities of Wellington, Mayfield, Perth, Riverdale, Rome, and nearby rural areas.

== Schools ==
The school district operates the following schools:

- Wellington High School
- Wellington Middle School
- Eisenhower Elementary School
- Kennedy Elementary School
- Lincoln Elementary School
- Washington Elementary School

== See also ==
- List of high schools in Kansas
- List of unified school districts in Kansas
- Kansas State Department of Education
- Kansas State High School Activities Association
