= Contemporary Educational Psychology =

- Discipline: Educational psychology
- Language: English
- Edited by: P. Karen Murphy

Publication details
- History: 1976–present
- Publisher: Elsevier

Standard abbreviations
- ISO 4: Contemp. Educ. Psychol.

Indexing
- ISSN: 0361-476X
- OCLC no.: 1011198484

Links
- Journal homepage

Contemporary Educational Psychology is a peer-reviewed academic journal on the topic of educational psychology. Its editor-in-chief is P. Karen Murphy (Pennsylvania State University).

Contemporary Educational Psychology publishes empirical research from around the globe that substantively advances, extends, or re-envisions the ongoing discourse in educational psychology research and practice. Published works are grounded in a rich, inclusive theoretical and empirical framework that gives way to critical and timely questions facing educational psychology as well as actionable implications for education research and practice. Accepted manuscripts advance cutting-edge theoretical and methodological perspectives that address critical and timely education questions.

The journal welcomes rigorously conducted qualitative, quantitative, and mixed-methods contemporary empirical research within educational psychology. The journal also aims to publish research that employs participant samples representative of the intended population and engaged in authentic teaching or learning contexts, through either formal or informal settings. The journal highly encourages empirical research that exemplifies values of diversity, equity, and inclusion within education.
