= Perth, Kansas =

Unincorporated community in Sumner County, Kansas

- Unincorporated community
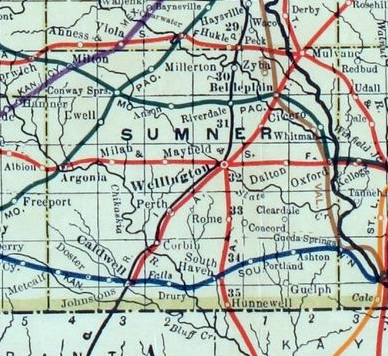
- 1915 railroad map of Sumner County

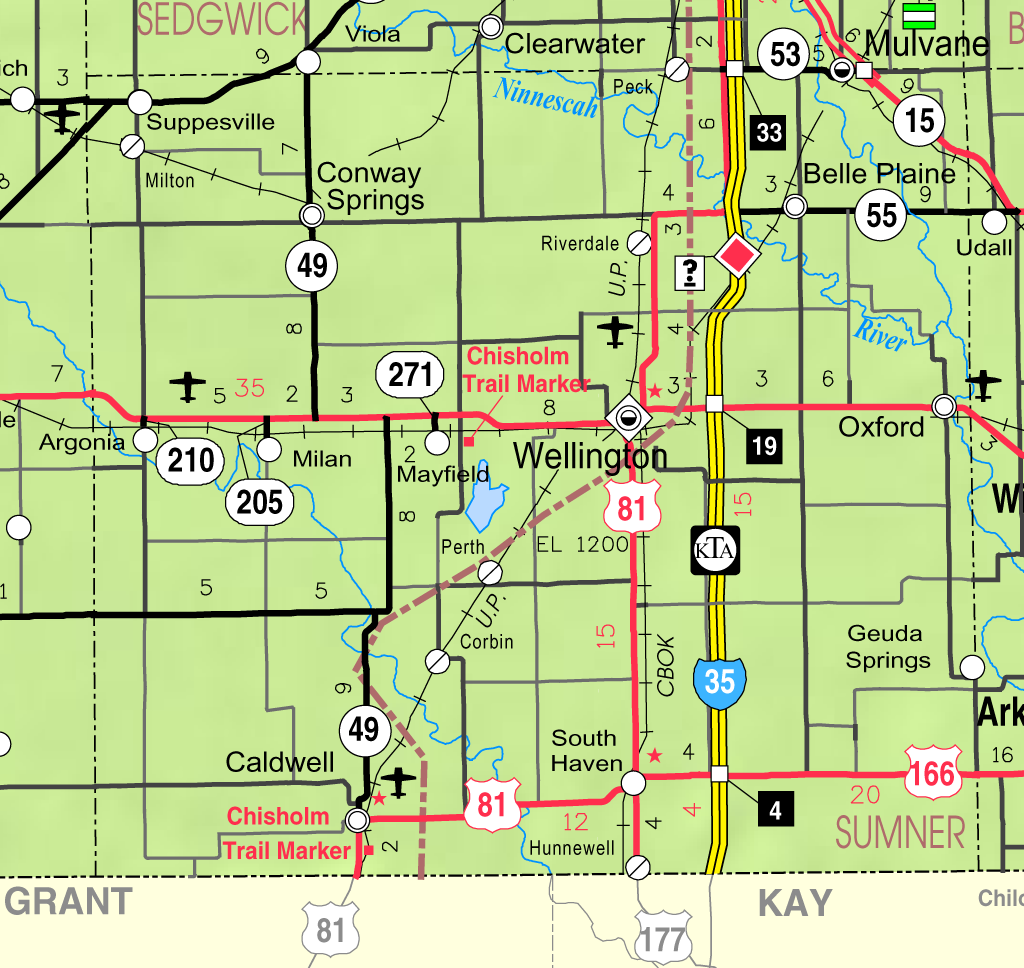
- KDOT map of Sumner County (legend)

- Location within Kansas Location within the United States
- Coordinates: 37°10′29″N 97°30′19″W
- Country: United States
- State: Kansas
- County: Sumner
- Elevation: 1,207 ft (368 m)
- Time zone: UTC-6 (CST)
  - Summer (DST): UTC-5 (CDT)
- FIPS code: 20-55500
- GNIS ID: 470305

Perth is an unincorporated community in Sumner County, Kansas, United States. It is located about 9 miles southwest of Wellington near the intersection of S Clearwater Rd and W 80th St S, next to the railroad.

== History ==
A post office was opened in Perth in 1882, and remained in operation until it was discontinued in 1954.

== Education ==
The community is served by Wellington USD 353 public school district.

== Transportation ==
The Chicago, Rock Island and Pacific Railroad formerly provided passenger rail service to Perth on their mainline from Minneapolis to Houston until at least 1951. As of 2025, the nearest passenger rail station is located in Newton, where Amtrak's Southwest Chief stops once daily on a route from Chicago to Los Angeles.

== Notable people ==
- Edward Gallagher (1887–1940), head coach of Oklahoma State Cowboys wrestling, born in Perth.
- George Kelly (1905–1967), psychologist, therapist, educator, considered the father of cognitive clinical psychology. He was born on a farm near Perth.
