= Vittorio Guidano =

Italian neuropsychiatrist

Vittorio Filippo Guidano (4 August 1944, Rome, Italy – 31 August 1999, Buenos Aires, Argentina) was an Italian neuropsychiatrist, creator of the cognitive procedural systemic model and contributor to constructivist post-rationalist cognitive therapy. His cognitive post-rationalist model was influenced by attachment theory, evolutionary epistemology, complex systems theory, and the prevalence of abstract mental processes proposed by Friedrich Hayek. Guidano conceived the personal system as a self-organized entity, in constant development.

Among his published writings are the books Complexity of the Self (1987) and The Self in Progress (1991). He was the first president of the Italian Society of Behavioural and Cognitive Therapy (SITCC) and he co-founded the Institute of Post-Rationalist Psychology and Psychotherapy (IPRA). Guidano's work has been called "the most important influence" on Jeffrey Young's schema therapy. He also influenced the elaboration of other constructivist psychotherapies such as coherence therapy.

== Post-rationalist cognitive therapy ==
Post-rationalist cognitive therapy is a type of constructivist cognitive therapy that was created by Guidano in the 1980s and 1990s.

In the early 1980s, Guidano published the book Cognitive Processes and Emotional Disorders (1983) with his colleague Giovanni Liotti. In this book the authors still adhered to and used the cognitive restructuring techniques created by Albert Ellis and Aaron Beck, although they added to them their own theoretical model about evolutionary development from childhood, influenced by the Jean Piaget's genetic epistemology and John Bowlby's attachment theory.

This model, which the authors call the "evolutionary-structural" approach to cognitive therapy, stated that human beings form certain knowledge schemes from childhood that are affective in nature and more central than propositional knowledge schemes in linguistic format. Central affective knowledge schemes are formed from attachment ties with parents or caregivers, and establish certain biased ways of perceiving the world, perceiving oneself, and relating to others.

Guidano later incorporated the influence of Donald T. Campbell and Karl Popper's evolutionary epistemology (the study of knowledge from a biological perspective), complex systems theory, Humberto Maturana's radical constructivism. and Jerome Bruner's narrative psychology.

=== Autopoiesis ===
Guidano borrows the notion of autopoiesis, originally developed by Chilean biologists Humberto Maturana and Francisco Varela.

Autopoiesis is the self-organizing nature of living beings, which means they have autonomy. Maturana and Varela defined autopoiesis as the characteristic of a system that maintains and reproduces itself through its own processes. A system is autopoietic if it is capable of producing and maintaining the components that constitute it.

These systems have distinct boundaries that separate them from their environment, but they are open to interactions with the environment, such as the exchange of energy or matter. These interactions are regulated by the system itself.

The key idea is that the system's internal processes are organized in a way that they produce the system's own components in a self-sustaining cycle. This makes the system autonomous, as it doesn't rely on external forces for its reproduction.

In their view, living organisms are examples of autopoietic systems because they continually produce and regenerate the components necessary for their existence, such as proteins, cells, and organs. Vittorio Guidano extended the concept of autopoiesis to the realm of psychology and cognitive science. He applied the theory to human psychological development, suggesting that the mind itself is an autopoietic system. According to Guidano, our subjective experiences and the meaning we derive from them are generated by the mind through an ongoing self-organization of cognitive processes.

Guidano also argued that self-identity is formed through this self-referential process. The way we perceive ourselves is constructed by an internal, dynamic system that adapts and responds to both internal and external stimuli.

=== Two levels of human experience ===
Guidano and Liotti distinguish two levels of human knowledge: the tacit level of sensorimotor, imaginative, and emotional knowledge, and the explicit level of linguistic and propositional knowledge.

Explicit level: This level represents the conscious, verbalizable aspects of human experience. It includes thoughts, beliefs, memories, and emotions that individuals are aware of and able to express verbally. The explicit level is characterized by language and cognitive processes such as problem-solving and logical reasoning. It encompasses the narratives and stories that individuals construct to make sense of their experiences and identities.

Tacit level: In contrast, the tacit level represents the unconscious, non-verbal aspects of human experience. It includes underlying assumptions, implicit memories, emotional reactions, and bodily sensations that may not be consciously recognized or articulated by individuals. The tacit level is characterized by automatic, non-conscious processes that influence individuals' perceptions, behaviors, and emotional responses. It encompasses tacit schemas, scripts, and patterns of relating that are formed through early experiences, attachment and social interactions. The tacit level is hierarchically supra-ordered, that is, it orders and determines the possibilities that the more superficial explicit schemes take. Tacit knowledge structures are "core ordering processes", unconscious rules that organize current experience and anticipate subsequent experience. Furthermore, tacit processes do not appear in consciousness, that is, they determine explicit cognition without being included in it.

Guidano emphasized the dynamic interaction between these two levels of experience. He argued that while individuals may be consciously aware of their explicit thoughts and emotions, their tacit experiences and emotional responses often operate beneath conscious awareness, shaping their perceptions and behaviors in subtle ways.

Guidano's therapeutic approach aimed to help clients explore and integrate both explicit and tacit aspects of their experience, facilitating greater self-awareness, emotional regulation, and personal growth.

=== Constructivist epistemology ===
Guidano's constructivist epistemology means that, unlike the cognitive therapies of authors such as Aaron Beck and Albert Ellis, the post-rationalist cognitive-processual systemic approach, like other constructivist therapies, does not assume that the therapist has a superior access to reality than the patient and can identify irrational thought processes in the patient so that the patient can correct them.

Instead, both the patient and the therapist are constructors of meanings that must be reconstructed throughout the therapy. These meanings refer to the patient's life situation and, in later stages of the therapy, to his or her life history. Post-rationalist therapy is therefore historical in nature.

Guidano states that the therapist should not propose to the patient a correct way of thinking or interpreting his life situations, nor should he give the impression that the therapist knows a way of living that, if the patient adopted, would allow him to stop suffering forever. The therapist should not judge or directly criticize the patient's statements or the thoughts he expresses. In fact, the therapist is a "strategically oriented disturber" who seeks to increase the patient's awareness of the tacit rules by which he organizes his experience. The way in which the patient interprets therapeutic interventions does not depend only on the therapist but, above all, on the self-organizing properties of the patient's self system itself. Therefore, the interventions cannot be "instructive," but are disturbances that trigger the spontaneous reorganization of the patient's meaning systems.

Another aspect is that the patient is sought to increase his awareness of those aspects of his experience that, through self-deception, he leaves outside his consciousness. The therapist should therefore not encourage the defensive exclusion of certain areas of the patient's experience or point out to the patient that his interpretations of it are wrong.

All human experience and emotion, however strange or bizarre it may seem to an outside observer, is true as experience. The reorganization of meaning arises from the patient's experiencing of new emotions in therapy, and from the patient's progressive awareness of his tacit operating rules.

Cognitive change at an explicit level does not in itself lead to profound change. Profound change requires the emergence of emotions in the therapeutic relationship, and it is the emotional tone that the patient experiences during the reconstruction of his experiences that will produce the most profound modifications in the tacit emotional structure of his meanings.

=== Order through fluctuations ===
The concept of order through fluctuations comes from non-equilibrium thermodynamics and Ilya Prigogine's chaos theory, developed in his work on non-linear systems. Prigogine, who was a Belgian physicist and chemist, proposed that complex systems, far from equilibrium, can achieve emergent order through fluctuations. These fluctuations include chaotic dynamics that give rise to news structures of systemic order. That is, in dynamic systems, small variations or perturbations can, under certain conditions, give rise to a new state of organization or coherence at the global level. This type of order is not static or predictable in a simple way, but rather emerges through internal interactions of the system.

In Prigogine's theory, this concept is relevant in complex systems, such as nature, the brain or human societies, where internal fluctuations (small changes or perturbations) can generate a new form of organization.

In Guidano's approach, the concept of order through fluctuations is used to understand the dynamic and non-linear processes of the human mind. According to Guidano, people are not static beings or simply reactive to their environment, but continually construct their reality through a constant balancing process that involves fluctuations or changes in their perception or understanding of themselves and the world. Through therapy, one seeks to allow these fluctuations to lead to a new order, a new understanding of experience and identity, thereby facilitating a process of psychological self-organization.

That is, the cognitive and emotional fluctuations that a person may experience are seen as opportunities to reorganize their internal experience in a more coherent and adaptive manner. Through therapy, these fluctuations can be managed in ways that allow the person to achieve greater balance and a new form of inner order.

Another postulate of this model is that the evolution of knowledge during childhood and later life operates in a dialectical manner, that is, the subject encounters situations in the world that confirm his previous schemes and others that are discrepant. The latter make it necessary to modify the knowledge schemes and/or modify the environment, giving rise to more flexible and abstract cognitive structures.

=== Narrative identity ===
Guidano adopted the concept of narrative identity in the context of his psychotherapy. According to Guidano, human identity is not constructed in a static manner or simply from a series of fixed traits, but is constructed through a personal narrative, that is, from the stories that each individual tells himself about his life, his experiences and his relationship with others.

For Guidano, narrative identity implies that people organize their experiences and give them a coherent meaning through an internal narrative. This narrative is not something fixed or immutable, but is constantly changing, since the person can reconfigure it as he progresses in life, faces new challenges or undertakes new experiences. Identity is seen as a dynamic process, influenced both by social interactions and by the internal reflection that the individual carries out on his own existence.

Although identity is flexible, certain basic themes and characteristics tend to be self-perpetuating. Each person constructs their life narrative, seeking to give it internal coherence. That is, the tendency toward change coexists with the tendency toward maintenance. Each person has a certain "life theme" or "script." For example, a person who decides to become a tennis player will place great importance on tennis in their life, will practice tennis from a young age, will be a tennis player or not (and this will be important to them), and may later become a tennis coach.

Furthermore, the family in which a person grew up will usually have a decisive influence on the script and life plan that a person builds for himself.

Thus, Guidano proposes that identity is not a set of fixed attributes, but a narrative construction that adapts over time, depending on the experiences and the interpretation that each person makes of them. Narrative, therefore, becomes a means of giving meaning and continuity to a person's life, helping to integrate the various episodes and experiences into a coherent and meaningful story.

This idea is especially relevant in psychotherapy, where working with a person's narrative can help them find new ways of interpreting their life and, therefore, transform their identity in healthier and more adaptive ways.

=== Sensory abstraction ===
Guidano also drew upon Friedrich Hayek's concept of the sensory order as a framework for understanding the organization of human experience and cognition. Hayek, a Nobel Prize-winning economist and philosopher, introduced the concept of the Sensory Order in his work on neuroscience and psychology.

The sensory order refers to the way in which sensory inputs are organized and processed by the brain to create our subjective experience of the world.

Guidano applied this concept to psychotherapy by highlighting the role of sensory abstraction in shaping individuals' thoughts, emotions, and behaviors. He viewed human experience as a complex, self-organizing system, in which sensory inputs are actively interpreted and attributed meaning by the individual at the tacit level.

Guidano's use of Hayek's concept of the sensory order emphasized the importance of exploring the underlying perceptual processes that influence individuals' subjective experience of themselves and their world.

=== Personal meaning organizations ===
Guidano developed the concept of personal meaning organizations (PMOs) as part of his theory on the construction of personal meaning. According to Guidano, PMOs are fundamental emotional-cognitive structures or systems that help individuals make sense of their experiences and navigate the world. These organizations form the core of an individual's sense of identity and are critical in the development of their personal narrative.

PMOs are essentially self-organizing structures that give meaning to experiences and help an individual interpret events, relationships, and their own sense of self in a coherent and meaningful way.

Guidano identified four specific organizations of personal meaning (PMOs) that are related to different patterns of psychopathology. These organizations are related to the way individuals process and structure their experiences, particularly in relation to their emotional responses and cognitive styles.

Depressive: The depressive organization is characterized by a cognitive style in which individuals interpret their experiences in a negative light, often focusing on feelings of helplessness, worthlessness, and hopelessness. People with this organization tend to have a rigid, self-critical framework and a pervasive sense of failure. Depressive individuals have suffered a loss (which may be the death of a parent in childhood) or an early emotional detachment, which may take the form of emotional abandonment by parents who are only physically present. Themes of loss and defeat are embedded in the non-declarative implicit core of the depressive cognitive organization. From an early age, these individuals become independent and avoidantly attached because they have not received emotional warmth. However, the internal working model and the emotional self-schema related to loss and defeat can lead, in certain patients with a depressive PMO, to the activation of another behavioral-motivational system: the competitive system, which drives them to seek great achievements and thus compensate for their feeling of worthlessness.

Phobic: The phobic organization is characterized by an intense need for control and a tendency to avoid situations that might provoke anxiety. People with a phobic organization have often had parents who prevented their child from autonomous discovery and independence. The world outside the family was connoted to the child as dangerous, a place from which he had to be protected. Because of this, according to Guidano and Liotti, people with a phobic PMO perceive themselves as less capable than others of coping with the world and challenges of life outside the family environment. People with this organization structure their meaning around fear and anxiety, often developing rigid patterns of behavior designed to protect themselves from perceived threats. They tend to overestimate the danger in situations and develop avoidance behaviors to cope with perceived risks, leading to restricted life experiences.

Psychogenic eating disorder (PED): This organization is associated with individuals who develop eating disorders, such as anorexia or bulimia. The psychogenic eating disorder organization is marked by issues of control, self-worth, and identity, where individuals use food and eating behaviors as a way to manage emotional distress and regulate their sense of self. There is often a distorted relationship with the body and an obsessive focus on controlling food intake as a means of maintaining a sense of power and self-coherence.

Obsessive: The obsessive organization is characterized by a preoccupation with control, order, and perfectionism. Individuals with this organization often experience anxiety when things are not orderly or predictable, and they may engage in compulsive behaviors or thought patterns to alleviate this anxiety. Their meaning-making is often centered around an excessive need for certainty, a fear of making mistakes, and an inability to tolerate ambiguity or imperfection.

These four types of PMOs reflect different ways in which individuals organize meaning in their lives. These organizations are not pathological in themselves, but they can produce psychopathology when they become excessively rigid and limiting, leading to emotional distress and mental health problems.

Treatment, according to Guidano's approach, and common in some other approaches to psychotherapy, often involves helping individuals reframe and reorganize these meanings to promote healthier, more adaptive ways of thinking and living.

== Selected publications ==
- Arciero, Giampiero; Guidano, Vittorio F. (2000). "Experience, explanation, and the quest for coherence". In Neimeyer, Robert A.; Raskin, Jonathan D. (eds.). Constructions of disorder: meaning-making frameworks for psychotherapy. Washington, DC: American Psychological Association. pp. 91–118. doi:10.1037/10368-005. ISBN 1557986290. OCLC 42009389.
- Guidano, Vittorio F. (1995). "A constructivist outline of human knowing processes". In Mahoney, Michael J. (ed.). Cognitive and constructive psychotherapies: theory, research, and practice. New York: Springer Publishing. pp. 89–102. ISBN 0826186106. OCLC 30973986.
- Guidano, Vittorio F. (1995). "Constructivist psychotherapy: a theoretical framework". In Neimeyer, Robert A.; Mahoney, Michael J. (eds.). Constructivism in psychotherapy (1st ed.). Washington, DC: American Psychological Association. pp. 93–108. doi:10.1037/10170-004. ISBN 1557982791. OCLC 31518985.
- Guidano, Vittorio F. (1995). "Self-observation in constructivist psychotherapy". In Neimeyer, Robert A.; Mahoney, Michael J. (eds.). Constructivism in psychotherapy (1st ed.). Washington, DC: American Psychological Association. pp. 155–168. doi:10.1037/10170-007. ISBN 1557982791. OCLC 31518985.
- Guidano, Vittorio F. (1991). The self in process: toward a post-rationalist cognitive therapy. New York: Guilford Press. ISBN 0898624479. OCLC 22665277.
- Guidano, Vittorio F. (1991). "Affective change events in a cognitive therapy system approach". In Safran, Jeremy D.; Greenberg, Leslie S. (eds.). Emotion, psychotherapy, and change. New York: Guilford Press. pp. 50–82. ISBN 0898625564. OCLC 22665279.
- Guidano, Vittorio F. (1988). "A systems, process-oriented approach to cognitive therapy". In Dobson, Keith S. (ed.). Handbook of cognitive-behavioral therapies (1st ed.). New York: Guilford Press. pp. 307–354. ISBN 0898627044. OCLC 15107320.
- Guidano, Vittorio F. (1987). Complexity of the self: a developmental approach to psychopathology and therapy. Guilford clinical psychology and psychotherapy series. New York: Guilford Press. ISBN 0898620120. OCLC 15220957.
- Guidano, Vittorio F. (1986). "The self as mediator of cognitive change in psychotherapy". In Hartman, Lorne M.; Blankstein, Kirk R. (eds.). Perception of self in emotional disorder and psychotherapy. Advances in the study of communication and affect. Vol. 11. New York: Plenum Press. pp. 305–330. doi:10.1007/978-1-4613-1793-7_12. ISBN 0306423154. OCLC 14240470.
- Guidano, Vittorio F.; Liotti, Giovanni (1985). "A constructivistic foundation for cognitive therapy". In Mahoney, Michael J.; Freeman, Arthur (eds.). Cognition and psychotherapy (1st ed.). New York: Plenum Press. pp. 101–142. doi:10.1007/978-1-4684-7562-3_4. ISBN 0306418584. OCLC 11676735.
- Guidano, Vittorio F.; Liotti, Giovanni (1983). Cognitive processes and emotional disorders: a structural approach to psychotherapy. Guilford clinical psychology and psychotherapy series. New York: Guilford Press. ISBN 0898620066. OCLC 7875515.
