= Semantics (psychology) =

Study of how the mind stores meaning

Semantics within psychology is the study of how meaning is stored in the mind.

== Semantic memory ==
Semantic memory is a type of long-term declarative memory that refers to facts or ideas which are not immediately drawn from personal experience. It was first theorized in 1972 by W. Donaldson and Endel Tulving. Tulving employs the word semantic to describe a system of memory that involves “words and verbal symbols, their meanings and referents, the relations between them, and the rules, formulas, or algorithms for influencing them”.

In psychology, semantic memory is memory for meaning – in other words, the aspect of memory that preserves only the gist, the general significance, of remembered experience – while episodic memory is memory for the ephemeral details – the individual features, or the unique particulars of experience. The term 'episodic memory' was introduced by Tulving and Schacter in the context of 'declarative memory' which involved simple association of factual or objective information concerning its object. Word meaning is measured by the company they keep, i.e. the relationships among words themselves in a semantic network. The memories may be transferred intergenerationally or isolated in one generation due to a cultural disruption. Different generations may have different experiences at similar points in their own time-lines. This may then create a vertically heterogeneous semantic net for certain words in an otherwise homogeneous culture. In a network created by people analyzing their understanding of the word (such as Wordnet) the links and decomposition structures of the network are few in number and kind, and include part of, kind of, and similar links. In automated ontologies the links are computed vectors without explicit meaning. Various automated technologies are being developed to compute the meaning of words: latent semantic indexing and support vector machines as well as natural language processing, artificial neural networks and predicate calculus techniques.

== Connection to Synesthesia ==
Synesthesia simply put is when a person experiences more than one sense simultaneously (i.e., sensory crossovers). The subject is affected by stimuli in their environment while the brain associates it with an un-related sense

Some forms of synesthesia result from the development of a person’s semantic memory. Knowledge the person has acquired acts as a trigger for synesthesia associations. Semantic memory built on the learnings from childhood may facilitate synesthesia. Being taught letters, numbers, and time appear to be common triggers for synesthesia as these are typically the first abstract teachings encountered.

Memorization of letters, numbers and time units lend themselves to being easily manipulated mentally during the learning process. These concepts can be linked to tangible stimuli the child has in their environment, which could allow them to recollect concepts more quickly, accurately or more easily make cross-references between them.

As such, synesthesia could be deemed helpful to mental operations that assist with acquiring semantic memory of abstract concepts by allowing for abstract concepts to be associated with concrete concepts. Examples can be associating certain emotions with a smell or sound, or musical notes with colors

== Ideasthesia ==
Ideasthesia is a psychological phenomenon in which activation of concepts evokes sensory experiences. Synesthetic experiences resulting despite lack of physical stimuli are mind-depednent or mind-driven higher synesthesia are considered ideasthesia.

The relationship between graphemes and colors, also known as grapheme-color synesthesia, is a typical example of ideasthesia. Here, the alphabet's letters are connected to vibrant color experiences. According to studies, the extracted meaning of a stimulus determines the context-dependent perception of color. For instance, depending on the context in which it is presented, an ambiguous stimulus '5' that can be read as either 'S' or '5' will have the color associated with either 'S' or '5'. If it is provided with other numbers, it will be read as "5" and associated with the respective color. If it is presented between letters, it will be recognized as a "S" and associated with the respective synesthetic color.
