= Downs Township, Kansas =

Township in Sumner County, Kansas, U.S.

Downs Township
- Township
- Location within Sumner County
- Coordinates: 37.170142°N 97.529345°W
- Country: United States
- State: Kansas
- County: Sumner
- Established: 1879

Government
  - Trustee: Travis Isaacs

Area
  - Total: 35.113 sq mi (90.94 km^{2})
  - Land: 35.113 sq mi (90.94 km^{2})
  - Water: 0 sq mi (0 km^{2}) 0%

Population (2020)
  - Total: 139
  - Density: 3.96/sq mi (1.53/km^{2})
- Time zone: UTC-6 (CST)
  - Summer (DST): UTC-5 (CDT)
- Area code: 620
- GNIS feature ID: 470320

Downs Township is a township in Sumner County, Kansas, United States. As of the 2020 census, its population was 139.

== History ==
Downs Township was established in 1879 from parts of Chikaskia Township and Jackson Township.

== Geography ==
Downs Township covers an area of 35.113 square miles (90.94 km^{2}), all of it land. The Chikaskia River flows through it.

=== Communities ===
- Perth

=== Adjacent townships ===
Osborne Township, Sumner County
Ryan Township, Sumner County	northwest	north	northeast	Wellington Township, Sumner County
Chikaskia Township, Sumner County	west	self	east	Jackson Township, Sumner County
Caldwell Township, Sumner County	southwest	south	southeast	South Haven Township, Sumner County
Falls Township, Sumner County

== Transportation ==
=== Major highways ===
- K-49

== Demographics ==
As of the 2020 census, the township had a population of 139, giving a population density of 3.96 people per square mile (1.53 people/km^{2}). The racial makeup of the township was 94.2% White, 0.7% Black or African American, 0.7% from some other race, and 4.3% from two or more races. Hispanics or Latinos of any race were 0.7% of the population.

The 2020–2024 American Community Survey estimated that the township contained 48 households and 48 housing units.
