= Falls Township, Sumner County, Kansas =

Township in Sumner County, Kansas, U.S.

Falls Township
- Township
- Location within Sumner County
- Coordinates: 37.063113°N 97.528087°W
- Country: United States
- State: Kansas
- County: Sumner
- Established: 1873

Government
  - Trustee: Adam Cooper

Area
  - Total: 53.536 sq mi (138.66 km^{2})
  - Land: 53.536 sq mi (138.66 km^{2})
  - Water: 0 sq mi (0 km^{2}) 0%

Population (2020)
  - Total: 157
  - Density: 2.93/sq mi (1.13/km^{2})
- Time zone: UTC-6 (CST)
  - Summer (DST): UTC-5 (CDT)
- Area code: 620
- GNIS feature ID: 470086

Falls Township is a township in Sumner County, Kansas, United States. As of the 2020 census, its population was 157.

== History ==
Falls Township was established in 1873. The township was home to two now extinct towns: Alton, whose post office was in operation from 1872 to 1881, and Hessville, whose post office was in operation from 1872 to 1881 as well. Alton was first settled in 1871 and had a population of 75 in 1880. Hessville had a population of 50 in 1880.

== Geography ==
Falls Township covers an area of 53.536 square miles (138.66 km^{2}), all of it land. The Chikaskia River flows through it, as well as Bluff Creek, Fall Creek, and Spring Creek.

=== Communities ===
- Corbin
- Drury

=== Adjacent townships ===
Downs Township, Sumner County
Chikaskia Township, Sumner County	northwest	north	northeast	Jackson Township, Sumner County
Caldwell Township, Sumner County	west	self	east	South Haven Township, Sumner County
		south
Grant County, Oklahoma

== Transportation ==
=== Major highways ===
- US-81

== Demographics ==
As of the 2020 census, the township had a population of 157, giving a population density of 2.93 people per square mile (1.13 people/km^{2}). The racial makeup of the township was 93.0% White, 1.9% Native American, 1.3% from some other race, and 3.8% from two or more races. Hispanics or Latinos of any race were 2.5% of the population.

The 2020–2024 American Community Survey estimated that the township contained 63 households and 102 housing units.
