= Rome, Sumner County, Kansas =

Unincorporated community in Sumner County, Kansas

Rome, Kansas
- Unincorporated community
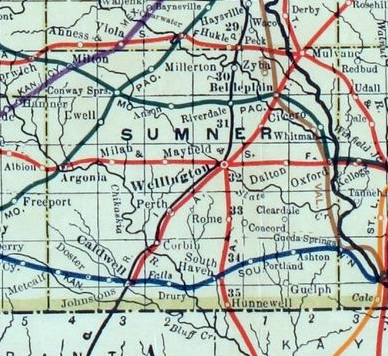
- 1915 railroad map of Sumner County

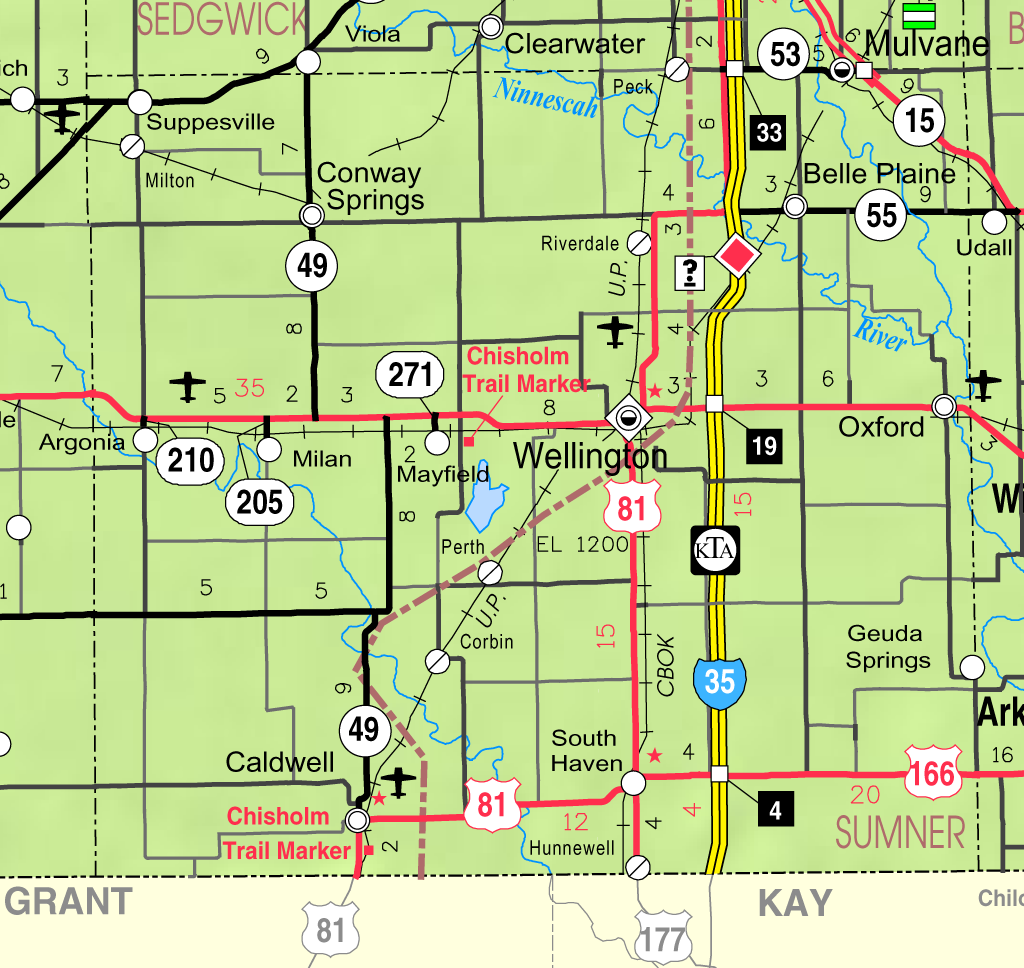
- KDOT map of Sumner County (legend)

- Location within Kansas Location within the United States
- Coordinates: 37°9′37″N 97°23′29″W
- Country: United States
- State: Kansas
- County: Sumner
- Elevation: 1,211 ft (369 m)
- Time zone: UTC-6 (CST)
  - Summer (DST): UTC-5 (CDT)
- Area code: 620
- FIPS code: 20-61000
- GNIS ID: 470318

Rome is an unincorporated community in Sumner County, Kansas, United States. It is located approximately 6.5 miles south of Wellington and about 0.5 mile east of the intersection of U.S. Route 81 and E 90th St, adjacent to the railroad.

== History ==
A post office was opened in Rome in 1874, and remained in operation until it was discontinued in 1933.

== Economy ==
Rome has a Farmers Co-Op Grain business with the capability to load grain into rail cars.

== Education ==
The community is served by Wellington USD 353 public school district.
