= Brian R. Gaines =

British scientist and engineer

Brian R. Gaines (born c. 1938) is a British scientist, engineer, and professor emeritus at the University of Calgary.

== Biography ==
Gaines received his Bachelor of Arts, Master of Arts and Doctor of Philosophy from Trinity College, Cambridge, and he is a Chartered Engineer, and Chartered Psychologist.

His previous positions include Professor of Industrial Engineering at the University of Toronto, Technical Director and Deputy Chairman of the Monotype Corporation, and Chairman of the Department of Electrical Engineering Science at the University of Essex. He was formerly Killam Memorial Research Professor, Dean of Graduate Studies, Associate Vice-president (Research) and Director of the Knowledge Science Institute at the University of Calgary.

He was president of the Society for General Systems Research in 1979. He is Fellow of the Institution of Electrical Engineers, the British Computer Society and the British Psychological Society.

He has been editor of the International Journal of Human-Computer Studies and of Knowledge Acquisition, and of the Computers and People and the Knowledge-Based Systems book series.

== Work ==
Gaines' research interests have included modelling the socioeconomic infrastructure of information technology, human–computer interaction, cognitive psychology, and systems theory.

Gaines is one of the pioneers in what is known as stochastic computing, a term he used first to characterise the highly attractive field when working at the Standard Telephones and Cables Ltd. (STL) in search of computational processors capable of learning during the 1960s.

Guy André Boy said of Gaines' role in the development of the field of knowledge acquisition:

In the 1980s a kind of artificial intelligence was developed that was founded on so-called knowledge-based systems and more specifically expert systems. Alongside this methods and tools were developed for acquiring knowledge and making it explicit based on experts in a field. Bryan Gaines [sic] and the Banff school had a big part to play in this scientific and technical field. The aim was to rationalize expert knowledge in order to make it operational within computerized databases.

== Publications ==
He has authored over 450 papers and authored or edited at least 11 books on a wide variety of aspects of computer and human systems. His books include:

- 1977. Fuzzy automata and decision processes. Edited with Madan M. Gupta and George N. Saridis.
- 1981. Fuzzy reasoning and its applications. Edited with E.H. Mamdani.
- 1984. Fuzzy sets and decision analysis. Edited with H.J. Zimmermann and L.A. Zadeh.
- 1984. Art of computer conversation: a new medium for communication. With Mildred L.G. Shaw.
- 1988. Knowledge acquisition for knowledge-based systems. Edited with J.H. Boose.
- 1988. Knowledge acquisition tools for expert systems. Edited with J.H. Boose.
- 1988. European Knowledge Acquisition Workshop: Proceedings of the European Knowledge Acquisition Workshop (EKAW'88) 19–23 June 1988. Edited with John Boose and Marc Linster.
- 1990. Machine learning and uncertain reasoning. Edited with J. H. Boose.
- 1992. Proceedings of the European Knowledge Acquisition Workshop (EKAW'91) 20–24 May 1991. Edited with Mark Linster.
- 1997. Artificial intelligence in knowledge management: papers from the 1997 AAAI Symposium, 24–26 March, Stanford, California. Edited with Mark A. Musen and Ramasamy Uthurusamy.
- 2013. Cognitive ergonomics: understanding, learning, and designing human–computer interaction. Edited with Pierre Falzon and Andrew F. Monk.

== See also ==
- Personal construct theory
- Universal logic
