= Personal construct theory =

Theory of personality and cognition

Within personality psychology, personal construct theory (PCT) or personal construct psychology (PCP) is a theory of personality and cognition developed by the American psychologist George Kelly in the 1950s. The theory addresses the psychological reasons for actions. Kelly proposed that individuals can be psychologically evaluated according to similarity–dissimilarity poles, which he called personal constructs (schemas, or ways of seeing the world). The theory is considered by some psychologists as forerunner to theories of cognitive therapy.

From the theory, Kelly derived a psychotherapy approach, as well as a technique called the repertory grid interview, that helped his patients to analyze their own personal constructs with minimal intervention or interpretation by the therapist. The repertory grid was later adapted for various uses within organizations, including decision-making and interpretation of other people's world-views. The UK Council for Psychotherapy, a regulatory body, classifies PCP therapy within the experiential subset of the constructivist school.

== Principles ==
A main tenet of PCP theory is that a person's unique psychological processes are channeled by the way they anticipate events. Kelly believed that anticipation and prediction are the main drivers of our mind. "Every man is, in his own particular way, a scientist", said Kelly: people are constantly building up and refining theories and models about how the world works so that they can anticipate future events. People start doing this at birth (for example, a child discovers that if they start to cry, their mother will come to them) and continue refining their theories as they grow up.

Kelly proposed that every construct is bipolar, specifying how two things are similar to each other (lying on the same pole) and different from a third thing, and they can be expanded with new ideas. (More recent researchers have suggested that constructs need not be bipolar.) People build theories—often stereotypes—about other people and also try to control them or impose on others their own theories so as to be better able to predict others' actions. All these theories are built up from a system of constructs. A construct has two extreme points, such as "happy–sad," and people tend to place items at either extreme or at some point in between. People's minds, said Kelly, are filled up with these constructs at a low level of awareness.

A given person, set of persons, any event, or circumstance can be characterized fairly precisely by the set of constructs applied to it and by the position of the thing within the range of each construct. For example, Fred may feel as though he is not happy or sad (an example of a construct); he feels as though he is between the two. However, he feels he is more clever than he is stupid (another example of a construct). A baby may have a preverbal construct of what behaviors may cause their mother to come to them. Constructs can be applied to anything people put their attention to, and constructs also strongly influence what people fix their attention on. People can construe reality by constructing different constructs. Hence, determining a person's system of constructs would go a long way towards understanding them, especially the person's essential constructs that represent their very strong and unchangeable beliefs and their self-construal.

Kelly did not use the concept of the unconscious; instead, he proposed the notion of "levels of awareness" to explain why people did what they did. He identified "construing" as the highest level and "preverbal" as the lowest level of awareness.

Some psychologists have suggested that PCT is not a psychological theory but a metatheory because it is a theory about theories.

== Therapy approach ==
Kelly believed in a non-invasive or non-directive approach to psychotherapy. Rather than having the therapist interpret the person's psyche, which would amount to imposing the doctor's constructs on the patient, the therapist should just act as a facilitator of the patient finding their own constructs. The patient's behavior is then mainly explained as ways to selectively observe the world, act upon it and update the construct system in such a way as to increase predictability. To help the patient find their constructs, Kelly developed the repertory grid interview technique.

Kelly explicitly stated that each individual's task in understanding their personal psychology is to put in order the facts of their own experience. Then the individual, like the scientist, is to test the accuracy of that constructed knowledge by performing those actions the constructs suggest. If the results of their actions are in line with what the knowledge predicted, then they have done a good job of finding the order in their personal experience. If not, then they can modify the construct: their interpretations or their predictions or both. This method of discovering and correcting constructs is roughly analogous to the general scientific method that is applied in various ways by modern sciences to discover truths about the universe.

== The repertory grid ==
The repertory grid serves as part of various assessment methods to elicit and examine an individual's repertoire of personal constructs. There are different formats such as card sorts, verbally administered group format, and the repertory grid technique.

The repertory grid itself is a matrix where the rows represent constructs found, the columns represent the elements, and cells indicate with a number the position of each element within each construct. There is software available to produce several reports and graphs from these grids.

To build a repertory grid for a patient, Kelly might first ask the patient to select about seven elements (although there are no fixed rules for the number of elements) whose nature might depend on whatever the patient or therapist are trying to discover. For instance, "Two specific friends, two work-mates, two people you dislike, your mother and yourself", or something of that sort. Then, three of the elements would be selected at random, and then the therapist would ask: "In relation to ... (whatever is of interest), in which way are two of these people alike but different from the third?" The answer is sure to indicate one of the extreme points of one of the patient's constructs. He might say for instance that Fred and Sarah are very communicative whereas John isn't. Further questioning would reveal the other end of the construct (say, introvert) and the positions of the three characters between extremes. Repeating the procedure with different sets of three elements ends up revealing several constructs the patient might not have been fully aware of.

In the book Personal Construct Methodology, researchers Brian R. Gaines and Mildred L.G. Shaw noted that they "have also found concept mapping and semantic network tools to be complementary to repertory grid tools and generally use both in most studies" but that they "see less use of network representations in PCP studies than is appropriate". They encouraged practitioners to use semantic network techniques in addition to the repertory grid.

=== Organizational applications ===
PCP has always been a minority interest among psychologists. During the last 30 years, it has gradually gained adherents in the US, Canada, the UK, Germany, Australia, Ireland, Italy and Spain. While its chief fields of application remain clinical and educational psychology, there is an increasing interest in its applications to organizational development, employee training and development, job analysis, job description and evaluation. The repertory grid is often used in the qualitative phase of market research, to identify the ways in which consumers construe products and services.

== See also ==
- Cognitive analytic therapy
- Decisional balance sheet § ABC model
- Idios kosmos
- Post-rationalist cognitive therapy
- Schema therapy
