= George Kelly (psychologist) =

American personality theorist (1905–1967)

- Born: April 28, 1905; Perth, Kansas, U.S.
- Died: March 6, 1967 (aged 61); Waltham, Massachusetts, U.S.
- Education: University of Edinburgh; University of Iowa
- Known for: Personal construct theory Repertory grid
- Scientific career
- Fields: Psychology
- Workplaces: Ohio State University; Brandeis University; Fort Hays State University
- Thesis: Common Factors in Reading and Speech Disabilities (1931)
- Doctoral advisors: Carl Seashore; Lee Edward Travis
- Doctoral students: Brendan Maher

George Alexander Kelly (April 28, 1905 – March 6, 1967) was an American psychologist, therapist, educator and personality theorist. He is considered a founding figure in the history of clinical psychology and is best known for his theory of personality, personal construct psychology. Kelly's work has influenced many areas of psychology, including constructivist, humanistic, existential, and cognitive psychology.

== Biography ==
George Alexander Kelly was born in 1905 on a farm near Perth, Kansas to two strictly religious parents. He was their only child. They moved frequently during his childhood years, resulting in a fragmented early education. He later attended Friends University and Park College, where he received a bachelor's degree in physics and mathematics. Early on, he was interested in social problems, and he went on to get his master's degree in sociology at the University of Kansas, where he wrote a thesis on workers' leisure activities. He also completed minor studies in labor relations.

Kelly taught at various colleges and other institutions, with course topics ranging from speech-making to "Americanization". In 1929, after receiving an exchange scholarship, he completed a Bachelor of Education degree at the University of Edinburgh in Scotland, writing a thesis dealing with the prediction of teaching success. He then returned to the United States to continue psychology studies and completed a graduate and doctoral degrees in psychology at the State University of Iowa in 1931. After he received his Ph.D. in psychology, Kelly worked as a psychotherapist in Kansas. His dissertation was on speech and reading disabilities. For some years before World War II, Kelly worked in school psychology, developing a program of traveling clinics which also served as a training ground for his students. He had a keen interest in clinical diagnosis. It was during this period that Kelly left behind this interest in psychoanalytic approach to human personality, because he said people were more troubled by natural disasters than any psychological issue, such as the libidinal forces.

During World War II, Dylan Brundage and Kelly worked as aviation psychologists, where, among other things, Kelly was responsible for a training program for local civilian pilots. After the war and a brief tenure as a psychology faculty member at the University of Maryland, he was appointed professor and director of clinical psychology at the Ohio State University, where he remained until 1965. Under his guidance, OSU's graduate psychology training programs became some of the best in the United States, offering a unique blend of clinical skills and a strong commitment to scientific methodology.

It is also at OSU that Kelly developed his major contribution to the psychology of personality. The Psychology of Personal Constructs was published in 1955 and achieved immediate international recognition, gaining him visiting appointments at various universities in the US as well as in Europe, the former Soviet Union, South America, the Caribbean, and Asia. He was also elected president of the clinical and the consulting divisions of the American Psychological Association, and served as president of the American Board of Examiners in Professional Psychology, providing expertise and insight, especially regarding ethical issues.

Kelly went on a world tour in 1961, invited to speak about his essays and articles all over the country. In 1964, Kelly wrote a paper for the First Old Saybrook Conference, which has been renamed to Association for Humanistic Psychology (AHP). Kelly's paper, "The threat of aggression", was later published in the Journal of Humanistic Psychology. Kelly transferred from Ohio State University to Brandeis University in the United States for the psychology department.

Kelly noted: "Johann Herbart's work on education and particularly mathematical psychology influenced me. I think mathematics is the pure instance of construct functioning—the model of human behavior" Although Kelly was influenced by Herbart—a philosopher, psychologist, and founder of pedagogy as an academic discipline—some of Kelly's inspiration for the theory of personal constructs came from a close friend of his. Namely, this friend had been an actor in some drama in college, and for two or three weeks he really got into his character and lived it as it was the real him. Kelly, unlike many people who would see this only as a sheer affectation, thought this was the expression of his real self and the behavior was authentic.

Kelly also worked extensively on researching the implications and applications of his theory, while continuing to work in clinical psychology. Joseph Rychlak is among his prominent students who expanded on his theories. Brendan A. Maher, who became a professor himself, published a selection of Kelly's essays and articles after his death. Kelly had all his students refer to him as "Professor Kelly"; however, when they would receive a Ph.D. dissertation they were permitted to call him George and he would also call them by their first name instead of "Miss", "Mrs.", or "Mister".

George Kelly left OSU to take an endowed faculty position as the Mashulam and Judith Riklis Chair in Behavioral Science at Brandeis University in 1965. Kelly died on March 6, 1967, at the age of 61, just two years after accepting the Riklis Chair of Behavioral Science at Brandeis.

Kelly's ideas are still used in today's findings to explore personality into greater depths. His ideas also help to uncover the patterns of behavior.

== Work ==
=== Kelly's concerns ===
Kelly did not like his theory being compared to other theories. Oftentimes, people believed Kelly's personal construct theory was similar to humanistic theories or cognitive theories, but Kelly thought of his theory as its own category of theories. Some say Kelly was similar to Ulric Neisser, "the father of cognitive psychology", because they both studied cognitive psychology characteristics, others say Kelly was similar to Abraham Maslow, the creator of Maslow's hierarchy of needs, because they both studied humanistic psychology characteristics. Although Kelly's research had some humanistic psychology characteristics, it differed from that field in many ways as well. Kelly rejected being labelled as a cognitive psychologist—to the extent that he almost wrote another book stating his theory had no link to cognitive theories.

Kelly saw that current theories of personality were so loosely defined and difficult to test that in many clinical cases the observer contributed more to the diagnosis than the patient. If people took their problems to a Freudian analyst, they would be analysed in Freudian terms; a Jungian would interpret them in Jungian terms; a behaviourist would interpret them in terms of conditioning; and so on.

Kelly acknowledged that both the therapist and patient would each bring a unique set of constructs to bear in the consulting room. Therefore, the therapist could never be completely "objective" in construing their client's world. The effective therapist was, however, one who construed the patient's material at a high level of abstraction within the patient's (as opposed to the therapist's) system of construction. The therapist could then comprehend the ways in which the patient saw the world that were disordered and help the patient to change their maladaptive constructs.

=== Personal construct psychology ===
Kelly's fundamental view of personality was that people are like naive scientists who see the world through a particular lens, based on their uniquely organized systems of construction, which they use to anticipate events. Personal construct theory explores the individual's map they form by coping with the psychological stresses of their lives. But because people are naive scientists, they sometimes employ systems for construing the world that are distorted by idiosyncratic experiences not applicable to their current social situation. A system of construction that chronically fails to characterize and/or predict events, and is not appropriately revised to comprehend and predict one's changing social world, is considered to underlie psychopathology (or mental illness.)

The body of Kelly's work, The Psychology of Personal Constructs, was written in 1955 when Kelly was a professor at Ohio State University. The first three chapters of the book were republished by W. W. Norton in paperback in 1963 and consist only of his theory of personality which is covered in most personality books. The re-publication omitted Kelly's assessment technique, the rep grid test, and one of his techniques of psychotherapy (fixed role therapy), which is rarely practiced in the form he proposed.

Kelly believed that each person had their own idea of what a word meant. If someone were to say their sister is shy, the word "shy" would be interpreted in different ways depending on the person's personal constructs they had already associated with the word "shy". Kelly wanted to know how the individual made sense of the world based on their constructs. Kelly believed that a person's own meaning and definition is the foundation of who and what that person is and helps give shape to a person's idea of what the world is based on their individual constructs.

On the other hand, Kelly's fundamental view of people as naive scientists was incorporated into most later-developed forms of cognitive-behavioral therapy that blossomed in the late 70s and early 80s, and into intersubjective psychoanalysis which leaned heavily on Kelly's phenomenological perspective and his notion of schematic processing of social information. Kelly's personality theory was distinguished from drive theories (such as psychodynamic models) on the one hand, and from behavioral theories on the other, in that people were not seen as solely motivated by instincts (such as sexual and aggressive drives) or learning history but by their need to characterize and predict events in their social world. Because the constructs people developed for construing experience have the potential to change, Kelly's theory of personality is less deterministic than drive theory or learning theory. People could conceivably change their view of the world and in so doing change the way they interacted with it, felt about it, and even others' reactions to them. For this reason, it is an existential theory, regarding humankind as having a choice to reconstrue themselves, a concept Kelly referred to as constructive alternativism. Constructs provide a certain order, clarity, and prediction to a person's world. Kelly referenced many philosophers in his two volumes but the theme of new experience being at once novel and familiar (due to the templates placed on it) is closely akin to the notion of Heraclitus: "we step and do not step in the same rivers." Experience is new but familiar to the extent that it is construed with historically derived constructs.

Kelly defined constructs as bipolar categories—the way two things are alike and different from a third—that people employ to understand the world. Examples of such constructs are "attractive", "intelligent", or "kind". A construct always implies contrast. So when an individual categorizes others as attractive, or intelligent, or kind, an opposite polarity is implied. This means that such a person may also evaluate the others in terms of the constructs "ugly", "stupid", or "cruel". In some cases, when a person has a disordered construct system, the opposite polarity is unexpressed or idiosyncratic. The importance of a particular construct varies among individuals. The adaptiveness of a construct system is measured by how well it applies to the situation at hand and is useful in predicting events. All constructs are not used in every situation because they have a limited range (range of convenience). Adaptive people are continually revising and updating their own constructs to match new information (or data) that they encounter in their experience.

Kelly's theory was structured as a testable scientific treatise with a fundamental postulate and a set of corollaries.

- Fundamental postulate: "A person's processes are psychologically channelized by the ways in which he [or she] anticipates events."
- The construction corollary: "a person anticipates events by construing their replications." This means that individuals anticipate events in their social world by perceiving a similarity with a past event (construing a replication).
- The experience corollary: "a person's construction system varies as he successively construes the replication of events."
- The dichotomy corollary: "a person's construction system is composed of a finite number of dichotomous constructs."
- The organization corollary: "each person characteristically evolves, for his convenience in anticipating events, a construction system embracing ordinal relationships between constructs."
- The range corollary: "a construct is convenient for the anticipation of a finite range of events only."
- The modulation corollary: "the variation in a person's construction system is limited by the permeability of the constructs within whose range of convenience the variants lie."
- The choice corollary: "a person chooses for himself that alternative in a dichotomized construct through which he anticipates the greater possibility for extension and definition of his system."
- The individuality corollary: "persons differ from each other in their construction of events."
- The commonality corollary: "to the extent that one person employs a construction of experience which is similar to that employed by another, his psychological processes are similar to the other person."
- The fragmentation corollary: "a person may successively employ a variety of construction subsystems which are inferentially incompatible with each other."
- The sociality corollary: "to the extent that one person construes the construction processes of another, he may play a role in a social process involving the other person."

Disordered constructs are those in which the system of construction is not useful in predicting social events and fails to change to accommodate new information. In many ways, Kelly's theory of psychopathology (or mental disorders) is similar to the elements that define a poor theory. A disordered construct system does not accurately predict events or accommodate new data.

=== Dimensions of transitions ===
Transitional periods in a person's life occur when they encounter a situation that changes their naive theory (or system of construction) of the way the world is ordered. They can create anxiety, hostility, and/or guilt and can also be opportunities to change one's constructs and the way one views the world.

The terms anxiety, hostility, and guilt had unique definitions and meanings in personal construct theory (The Psychology of Personal Constructs, Vol. 1, 486–534).

Anxiety develops when a person encounters a situation that their construct system does not cover, an event unlike any they have encountered. An example of such a situation is a woman from the western United States who is accustomed to earthquakes, who moves to the eastern United States and experiences great anxiety because of a hurricane. While an earthquake might be of greater magnitude, she experiences greater anxiety with the hurricane because she has no constructs to deal with such an event. She is caught "with her constructs down." Similarly, a boy who has been abused in early childhood may not have the constructs to accommodate kindness from others. Such a boy might experience anxiety in an outstretched hand that others view as benevolent.

Guilt is dislodgement from one's core constructs. A person feels guilt if they fail to confirm the constructs that define them. This definition of guilt is radically different from in other theories of personality. Kelly used the example of the man who regards others as cow-like creatures "making money and giving milk." Such a man might construe his role in relationship to others in terms of his ability to con favors or money from them. Such a man, who other psychologists might call a ruthless psychopath, and see as unable to experience guilt, feels guilt, according to Kelly's theory, when he is unable to con others: He is then alienated from his core constructs.

Hostility is "attempting to extort confirmation of a social prediction that is already failing." When a person encounters a situation in which they expect one outcome and receive quite a different one, they should change their theory or constructs rather than trying to change the situation to match their constructs. But the person who continually refuses to modify their belief system to accommodate new data, and in fact tries to change the data, is acting in bad faith and with hostility. Hostility, in Kelly's theory, is analogous to a scientist "fudging" their data. An example might be a professor who sees himself as a brilliant educator who deals with poor student reviews by devaluing the students or the means of evaluation.

=== Rep test ===
Rep stands for repertory grid. In 1955, George Kelly created an interactive grid known as the rep test based on his personal construct theory. The repertory grid is a mathematical way of giving meaning to one's own, or other people's, personal constructs. The repertory grid test needs a set of elements (such as people or things), and a set of constructs created by the individual. The test asks a person to list people or things that are important, then the responses are split into groups of three. There are three role-titles in each row; the person is to think how two of the constructs are alike, and how the other is different from the two that are alike. The responses are sorted into two poles, an emergent pole and implicit pole. The emergent pole is the way in which two elements are similar, while the implicit pole is the way in which the third element differs from the two that are similar. After extracting a construct, the individual analyzes the role-titles and checks the elements that are best described under the emergent pole and leaves blank the elements best described under the implicit pole. Kelly's repertory grid test can be used in many different situations, from clinical psychology to marketing, due to its ability to apply constructs to any kind of event. Kelly believed the repertory grid provided a "basis for a mathematics of psychological space"—a way to mathematically model any person's "psychological space".

== Selected publications ==
- 1955: The psychology of personal constructs. Vol. I, II. Norton, New York. (2nd printing: 1991, Routledge, London, New York)
- 1963: A theory of personality. The psychology of personal constructs. Norton, New York (= Chapt. 1-3 of Kelly 1955).
- 1969: Clinical psychology and personality: The selected papers of George Kelly. John Wiley & Sons, New York.
