= Victimology =

Study of victimization

Victimology is the study of victimization, including the psychological effects on victims, the relationship between victims and offenders, the interactions between victims and the criminal justice system—that is, the police and courts, and corrections officials—and the connections between victims and other social groups and institutions, such as the media, businesses, and social movements.

== Victim of a crime ==
In criminology and criminal law, a victim of a crime is an identifiable person who has been harmed individually and directly by the perpetrator, rather than by society as a whole. However, this may not always be the case, as with victims of white collar crime, who may not be clearly identifiable or directly linked to a crime against a particular individual. Victims of white-collar crime are often denied their status as victims by the social construction of the concept.

The Supreme Court of the United States first recognized the rights of crime victims to make a victim impact statement during the sentencing phase of a criminal trial in the case of Payne v. Tennessee (1991).

A victim impact panel, which usually follows the victim impact statement, is a form of community-based or restorative justice in which the crime victims (or relatives and friends of deceased crime victims) meet with the defendant after conviction to tell the convict about how the criminal activity affected them, in the hope of rehabilitation or deterrence.

=== Theories ===
Richard Quinney has argued that "the victim" is a social construct because, for a person to be labeled a victim, some form of societal agreement must exist. Societal power dynamics affect collective perceptions of victimization. Nils Christie classifies "ideal victims" as those most likely to obtain "the complete and legitimate status of being a victim" when harmed. Christie writes that this is most likely to occur when the victim is perceived as weak, was participating in a reputable activity, not seen as accountable for playing a part in their victimization, and the offender is large and evil and not known to the victim.

== Consequences of crimes ==
Emotional distress as a result of crime is a recurring theme for all victims of crime. The most common problems, affecting three-quarters of victims, were psychological problems, including fear, anxiety, nervousness, self-blame, anger, shame, and difficulty sleeping. These problems often result in the development of chronic post-traumatic stress disorder (PTSD). Post-crime distress is also linked to pre-existing emotional problems and sociodemographic variables. This has been known to become a leading case of older people being more adversely affected.

Victims may experience the following psychological reactions:

- Increase in the realization of personal vulnerability.
- The perception of the world as meaningless and incomprehensible.
- They view themselves in a negative light.

The experience of victimization may result in increasing fear on the part of the victim and the spread of fear in the community.

== Victim proneness ==
=== Environmental theory ===
The environmental theory posits that the location and context of the crime bring the victim of the crime and its perpetrator together. Research published between 2010 and 2025 gives some credence to this theory.

Studies in the early 2010s showed that crime is negatively correlated with trees in urban environments; more trees in an area are associated with lower victimization or violent crime rates. This relationship was established by studies in 2010 in Portland, Oregon and in 2012 in Baltimore, Maryland. Geoffrey Donovan of the United States Forest Service (USFS), one of the researchers, said, "trees, which provide a range of other benefits, could improve quality of life in Portland by reducing crime..." because "We believe that large street trees can reduce crime by signaling to a potential criminal that a neighborhood is better cared for and, therefore, a criminal is more likely to be caught." Note that the presence of large street trees especially indicated a crime reduction, as opposed to newer, smaller trees. In the 2012 Baltimore study, led by scientists from the University of Vermont and the United States Department of Agriculture (USDA), a "conservative spatially adjusted model indicated that a 10% increase in tree canopy was associated with a roughly 12% decrease in crime.... [and] we found that the inverse relationship continued in both contexts, but the magnitude was 40% greater for public than for private lands."

A study in the 2020s showed a strong positive association between "routine maintenance and repair of urban public places (e.g., street construction projects) with a reduction in community violence, proxied by violent crime incidents." Conversely, a study in the 2020s, showed a strong positive correlation between vacant, abandoned, or "cited" properties with family violence. Researchers at Tulane University found about child neglect and intimate partner violence (IPV) that:

The likelihood of experiencing child maltreatment at 12 months of age was more than twice as high for children living in neighborhoods with high vacant and cited property rates compared with women living in neighborhoods with fewer vacant and cited properties (OR = 2.11, 95% CI = 1.03, 4.31). Women living in neighborhoods characterized by high levels of vacant and cited properties were also more than twice as likely to report IPV (OR = 2.52, 95% CI = 1.21, 5.25). Associations remained mostly stable after controlling for key covariates.

=== Quantification of victim-proneness ===
There have been recent studies to quantify the actual existence of victim-proneness. Contrary to the popular belief that more women are repeat victims, and thus more victim-prone than men, actually men in their prime (15- to 34-year-old males) are more likely to be victims of repeated crimes.

In the case of juvenile offenders, the study results also show that people are more likely to be victimized as a result of a serious offense by someone they know; the most frequent crimes committed by adolescents towards someone they know were sexual assault, common assault, and homicide. Adolescents victimizing people they did not know generally committed common assault, forcible confinement, and armed or unarmed robbery.

Sex workers are, anecdotally, thought to have an abnormally high incidence of violent crime committed against them, and such crimes frequently go unresolved, but there are few victimological studies of the matter.

=== Fundamental attribution error ===
In social psychology, the fundamental attribution error (also known as correspondence bias or attribution effect) describes the tendency to over-value dispositional or personality-based explanations for the observed behaviors of others while under-valuing situational explanations for those behaviors. The term was coined by Lee Ross some years after a now-classic experiment by Edward E. Jones and Victor Harris (1967).

The fundamental attribution error is most visible when people explain others' behavior. It does not explain interpretations of one's own behavior, in which situational factors are often taken into account. This discrepancy is called the actor–observer bias. As a simple example, if Alice saw Bob trip over a rock and fall, Alice might consider Bob to be clumsy or careless (dispositional). If Alice later tripped over the same rock herself, she would be more likely to blame the placement of the rock (situational). Victim proneness or victim blaming can be a form of fundamental attribution error, and more specifically, the just-world phenomenon.

The just-world phenomenon or Just-world fallacy is the belief that people get what they deserve and deserve what they get, which was first theorized by Melvin Lerner (1977). Attributing failures to dispositional causes rather than situational causes, which are unchangeable and uncontrollable, satisfies our need to believe that the world is fair and we have control over our life. We are motivated to see a just world because this reduces our perceived threats, gives us a sense of security, helps us find meaning in difficult and unsettling circumstances, and benefits us psychologically. Unfortunately, the just-world fallacy also results in a tendency for people to blame and disparage victims of a tragedy or an accident, such as victims of rape and domestic abuse to reassure themselves of their insusceptibility to such events. People may even blame the victim's faults in "past lives" to justify their bad outcome.

== Victim facilitation ==
Victim facilitation, another controversial sub-topic, but a more accepted theory than victim proneness, finds its roots in the writings of criminologists such as Marvin Wolfgang. The choice to use "victim facilitation" rather than "victim proneness" or another term is that it does not blame the victim, but rather focuses on the victim's interactions that make them vulnerable to a crime.

The theory of victim facilitation calls for the study of the external elements that make a victim more accessible or vulnerable to an attack. In an article summarizing major international movements in victimology, Schneider presents victim facilitation as a model that ultimately describes only the offender's misinterpretation of victim behavior. It is based upon the theory of a symbolic interaction and does not alleviate the offender of their exclusive responsibility.

In Eric Hickey's Serial Murderers and Their Victims, a major analysis of 329 serial killers in America is conducted. As part of Hickey's analysis, he categorized victims as high, low, or mixed regarding the victim's facilitation of the murder. Categorization was based on lifestyle risk (for example, the amount of time spent interacting with strangers), type of employment, and location at the time of the killing (for example, a bar, home, or place of business). Hickey found that 13–15% of victims had high facilitation, 60–64% of victims had low facilitation, and 23–25% of victims had a combination of high and low facilitation. Hickey also noted that among serial killer victims after 1975, one in five victims were at greater risk from hitchhiking, working as a prostitute, or involving themselves in situations in which they often came into contact with strangers.

There is importance in studying and understanding victim facilitation as well as continuing to research it as a sub-topic of victimization. For instance, a study of victim facilitation increases public awareness, leads to more research on the victim-offender relationship, and advances theoretical etiologies of violent crime. One of the ultimate purposes of this type of knowledge is to inform the public and increase awareness so fewer people become victims. Another goal of studying victim facilitation, as stated by Maurice Godwin, is to aid in investigations. Godwin discusses the theory of victim social networks as a concept in which one looks at the areas of highest risk for victimization from a serial killer. This can be connected to victim facilitation because the victim social networks are the locations in which the victim is most vulnerable to the serial killer. Using this process, investigators can create a profile of places where the serial killer and victim both frequent.

== Victimization rate in United States ==
The National Crime Victimization Survey (NCVS) is a tool for measuring the occurrence of actual, rather than reported, crimes—the victimization rate. The National Crime Victimization Survey is the United States's "primary source of information on crime victimization. Each year, data is obtained from a nationally representative sample of 77,200 households comprising nearly 134,000 persons on the frequency, characteristics, and consequences of criminal victimization in the United States. This survey enables the government to estimate the likelihood of victimization for rape, sexual assault, robbery, assault, theft, household burglary, and motor vehicle theft for the population as a whole as well as for segments of the population such as women, the elderly, members of various racial groups, city dwellers, or other groups." According to the Bureau of Justice Statistics (BJS), the NCVS reveals that, from 1994 to 2005, violent crime rates declined, reaching the lowest levels ever recorded. Property crimes continue to decline.

Serial killings are waning in particular, and according to a 2020 ABA Journal report, it is in large part because "people are less vulnerable than in the past." This in turn is due to several societal changes, according to experts and a news reports cited by the ABA Journal: (1) "People don't hitchhike anymore"; (2) "They have means of reaching out in an emergency situation using cellphones;" (3) "There are cameras everywhere"; (4) "parents today are less likely to allow [children] to leave home unsupervised"; (5) "interventions that help troubled children might reform potential killers" (for example, social work, school nurses, and child psychology); (6) "easy access to pornography is providing an outlet that satiates ... sexual impulses"; and (7) "would-be serial killers are turning instead to mass shootings". Other reports show some evidence that serial killings are (8) deterred generally by "longer prison sentences" and (9) deterred specifically by "a reduction in parole".

== Victimization in Canada ==
In Canada, the Office of the Federal Ombudsman for Victims of Crime (OFOVC) is an independent resource for victims of crime. It was created in 2007 to ensure the federal government meets its responsibilities to victims of crime. The ombudsman provides information to victims about their rights under Canadian federal law, the services available to them, or to make a complaint about any federal agency or federal legislation dealing with victims of crime. The ombudsman also works to ensure that policymakers and other criminal justice personnel are aware of victims' needs and concerns, and to identify important issues and trends that may negatively affect victims. Where appropriate, the Ombudsman may also make recommendations to the federal government.

== International Crime Victims Survey ==
Many countries have such victimization surveys. They give a much better account for the volume crimes but are less accurate for crimes that occur with a (relative) low frequency, such as homicide, or victimless 'crimes' such as drug (ab)use. Attempts to use the data from these national surveys for international comparison have failed. Differences in definitions of crime and other methodological differences are too big for proper comparison.

A dedicated survey for international comparison: A group of European criminologists started an international victimization study with the sole purpose of generating international comparative crime and victimization data. The project is now known as the International Crime Victims Survey (ICVS). After the first round in 1989, the surveys were repeated in 1992, 1996, 2000, and 2004/2005.

== Penal couple ==
The penal couple is defined as the relationship between perpetrator and victim of a crime. That is, both are involved in the event. A sociologist invented the term in 1963. The term is now accepted by many sociologists. The concept is, essentially, that "when a crime takes place, it has two partners, one the offender and the second the victim, who is providing opportunity to the criminal in committing the crime." The victim, in this view, is "a participant in the penal couple and should bear some 'functional responsibility' for the crime." The very idea is rejected by some other victimologists as blaming the victim.

== Rights of victims ==
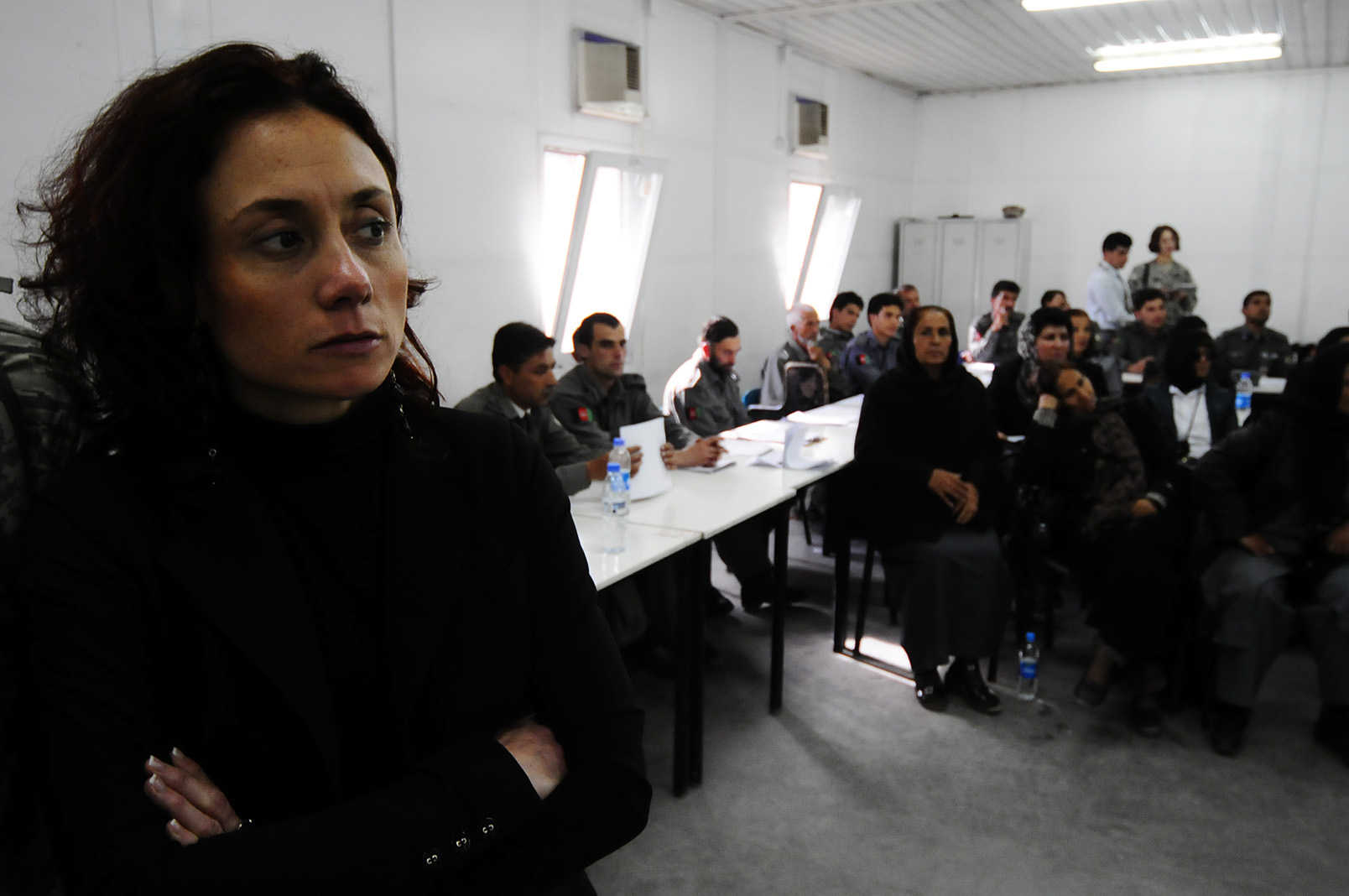
Anna Costanza Baldry (left), senior researcher at the International Victimology Institute Tilburg (INTERVICT), watches as participants conduct role-play scenarios during domestic and gender-based violence training at the Central Training Center. Afghan National Police (ANP)

In 1985, the UN General Assembly adopted the Declaration on the Basic Principles of Justice for Victims of Crime and Abuse of Power. Also, the International Victimology Institute Tilburg (INTERVICT) and the World Society of Victimology developed a UN Convention for Victims of Crime and Abuse of Power. The World Society of Victimology (WSV) is an international, non-governmental organization, holding special category consultive status with the Economic and Social Council of the United Nations as well as with the Council of Europe. Its international membership includes front-line victim service providers, academics and researchers in related social sciences, government representatives, lawyers, law enforcement, and other interested parties. The purpose of the WSV is to advance the research of victimology and practices on an international level, and to improve cooperation between global, national, and local organizations that serve victims. Its chairperson since 2024 is Gema Varona.

Under Indian law, there is a de minimis compensatory measure to victims of crimes.

== See also ==
- Sarah Ben-David
- British Crime Survey
- Bullying
- Center on Juvenile and Criminal Justice
- Child abuse
- Clandestine abuse
- Coping
- Crime victim advocacy program
- Crime Victims' Rights Week
- Dehumanization
- Deterrence (penology)
- Developmental psychopathology
- Effects of domestic violence on children
- Effects of rape and aftermath
- Marty Goddard - developer of the first rape test kit
- Hate speech
- Juvenile delinquency
- Like sheep to the slaughter
- Gérard Lopez (psychiatrist)
- Major depressive disorder
- Mass gathering
- Physical abuse
- Post traumatic stress disorder
- Psychological abuse
- Psychological projection
- Race and crime in the United States
- Role engulfment
- Sexual abuse
- Shame
- Slut-shaming
- Social disorganization theory
- Social emotional development
- Social exclusion
- Social stress
- Stockholm syndrome
- Theories of victimology
- Victim blaming
- Victim mentality
- Victim playing
- Victim study
- Victim support
- Victims' rights group
