= Primal world beliefs =

Beliefs about the general character of the world

In psychology, primal world beliefs (also known as primals) are basic beliefs which humans hold about the general character of the world. They were introduced and named by Jeremy D. W. Clifton and colleagues at the University of Pennsylvania between 2014–2019 and modeled empirically via statistical dimensionality reduction analysis in a 2019 journal article. This publication posited twenty-six primal world beliefs that people held. Most cluster under the beliefs that the world is Safe, Enticing and Alive, which in turn cluster under the overall belief that the world is Good. The beliefs that the world is Just or Dangerous had received extensive prior study in other research on the just-world belief, which is the belief the world is a karmic place where outcomes are typically deserved. Each primal is modeled as a normally-distributed continuous variable. Research has shown that primals remain quite stable over time, including across the first several months of the COVID-19 pandemic. Primal world beliefs are largely independent of most demographic variables, but correlate strongly with many personality and wellbeing variables—including depression, optimism, spirituality, extraversion, curiosity, and so forth. Researchers think that primals may affect a wide range of human experiences, from parenting to political ideology.

== History and antecedent scholarship ==
Statements about the overall nature of the world can be found across history, including in the discourse of the pre-Socratic philosophers, who debated whether the world was defined by principles like apeiron (the indefinite), nous (intelligence) or Heraclitus' ta panta rhei (constant change). In 1919, the psychiatrist and philosopher Karl Jaspers published his Psychologie der Weltanschauungen (Psychology of World Views), a philosophical "typology of mental attitudes ... intended to provide an interpretive account of basic psychological dispositions". A 2004 review of the worldview literature conducted by Mark Koltko-Rivera suggests that most of this research focuses on beliefs about topics more specific than the world's overarching character, with the main exception being just-world belief.

Just-world belief is essentially the conviction that the world is a karmic place where people "get what they deserve". This belief, which has been extensively studied by psychologists such as Melvin Lerner since the 1960s, has been tied to greater gross domestic product and personal life satisfaction, as well as a greater tendency to blame victims for their misfortune; among children it has been linked to less participation in bullying and to higher grades.

Research has tied dangerous-world belief (or what Clifton and colleagues call low endorsement of the primal Safe) to beliefs about vulnerability to disease and the ubiquity of germs, and suggested that it is moderated by ambient darkness. Another thread of research on belief in a dangerous world has posited a relationship with political conservatism. Recent studies show that this literature, however, relies on a measure that emphasizes dangers like societal decline and deemphasizes some other types of threat. Subsequent research by Clifton and colleagues on primals and political ideology, conducted with the primal world beliefs measure, showed a negligible association between dangerous-world belief and conservatism.

The psychological study of beliefs has supported significant developments in clinical psychology, including in cognitive behavioral therapy (CBT), a common form of psychotherapy developed in part by Aaron Beck since the 1960s. Beck was influenced in part by George Kelly's psychology of personal constructs, published in the 1950s. Beck's approach to CBT is based on the proposition that inaccurate and negative beliefs about the self, the future, and the world (what Beck called the cognitive triad) cause and maintain depression and other emotional disorders; when these maladaptive beliefs are corrected through therapy, patients' symptoms may be reduced. CBT can be equally efficacious as antidepressant medication for severely depressed patients, and has been shown to reduce rates of relapse/recurrence.

Another precursor to the primals construct is Ronnie Janoff-Bulman's shattered assumptions theory, published around 1990, which proposes that humans hold broad, schematic beliefs about the self and the world (e.g. "the world is benevolent"). According to this theory, new information and experiences are integrated with these existing schemas—except in instances of trauma which may "shatter" a person's positive assumptions about the world. Though highly influential, this conclusion is complicated by some research showing small effect sizes even in populations that have experienced highly traumatic events.

== Identification ==
Primal world beliefs were identified through a broad-based empirical effort by a research team at the University of Pennsylvania led by Jeremy D. W. Clifton from 2014 to 2019. The process began with systematic identification of candidate primals through:

- Textual analyses: Several hundred historical texts (14 sacred texts, 100 novels, 100 films, 100 political speeches, and 71 philosophical treatises) were examined for instances of the terms world, universe, everything, nothing, and life in any statement attributing qualities to the world as a whole. These quotations were collected and coded by type of world belief. A second corpus was 80,677 individual tweets beginning with the phrases The world is, The universe is, or Everything is, gleaned from a random 1% Twitter stream from 2010 to 2013. Natural language processing tools extracted 718 grammatical objects of the verb is; tweets with these objects were fed into Latent Dirichlet Allocation to group the data into topics, which were then qualitatively coded by type of world belief. A third textual source comprised the 840 most frequently used adjectives in the Corpus of Contemporary American English. After the removal of all adjectives that could not meaningfully describe the world as a whole (e.g. "married", "Canadian", "steep"), the remaining words were classified by topic.
- Expert retreats and interviews: Ten American experts in the social sciences convened at the University of Pennsylvania to discuss and identify candidate primals. An additional retreat took place at Tsinghua University to facilitate interviews between psychologists and experts in Confucianism, Buddhism, Daoism, and Chinese traditional philosophy.
- Focus group discussions: Ten focus groups among self-identified adherents of Christianity, Buddhism, Islam, and Hinduism in living in Baltimore, MD, and two focus groups among graduate students in Beijing sought to capture diverse spontaneous expressions of candidate primals.
- Literature and theory review: To locate extant scholarship on world beliefs across multiple disciplines, experts in six subject areas (political science, cultural anthropology, comparative religion, art history, philosophy, and psychology) composed literature reviews in each discipline on the understanding of world beliefs in their respective fields.

Inputs from these and other candidate primal identification efforts were synthesized in phases, with latter phases failing to introduce additional world beliefs, suggesting saturation. A measurement model was tested through multiple rounds of exploratory and confirmatory factor analysis and examined for validity and reliability. The results revealed 26 primal world beliefs, most of which fall under the beliefs that the world is Safe, Enticing and Alive ("secondary primals"), which in turn form the overarching belief that the world is Good ("primary primal").

Primal world beliefs are measurable with the following psychometrically validated scales:

- A 6-item survey measuring overall belief that the world is Good.
- An 18-item survey measuring the beliefs that the world is Good, Safe, Enticing and Alive.
- A longer 99-item survey measuring all 26 primal world beliefs is considered the most accurate measure of primal world beliefs.

== Secondary primals ==
Most person-level variance across primals is explained by the three beliefs that the world is Safe (vs. dangerous), Enticing (vs. dull) and Alive (vs. mechanistic). These can be understood as the three main reasons to view the world as an overall Good (rather than bad) place, and are among the primals most strongly correlated to wellbeing and other mental health indicators. The following descriptions of Safe, Enticing, and Alive world beliefs are extracted from the foundational 2019 empirical article on primal world beliefs:

Those low on Safe see a Hobbesian world defined by misery, decay, scarcity, brutality and dangers of all sorts. Base rates for hazards—from germs to terrorism to getting stabbed in the back—are generally higher. In response to chronic external threats, they remain on high alert, often viewing the nonvigilant as irresponsible. Those high on Safe see a world of cooperation, comfort, stability, and few threats. To them, things are safe until proven otherwise, vigilance appears neurotic, risk is not that risky, and, in general, people should calm down.

Those low on Enticing inhabit dull and ugly worlds where exploration offers low return on investment. They know real treasure—truly beautiful and fascinating things—is rare and treasure-hunting appropriate only when it's a sure bet. Those high on Enticing inhabit an irresistibly fascinating reality. They know treasure is around every corner, in every person, under every rock, and beauty permeates all. Thus, life is a gift, boredom a misinformed lifestyle choice, and exploration and appreciation is the only rational way to live.

Those low on Alive inhabit inanimate, mechanical worlds without awareness or intent. Since the universe never sends messages, it makes no sense to try to hear any. Those high on Alive sense that everything happens for a purpose and are thus sensitive to those purposes. To them, life is a relationship with an active universe that animates events, works via synchronicity, communicates, and wants help on important tasks.

There are also five 'neutral' primals that are unrelated to the beliefs that the world is Good, Safe, Enticing or Alive. These are Acceptable (vs. unacceptable), Changing (vs. not changing), Hierarchical (vs. nonhierarchical), Interconnected (vs. separable), Understandable (vs. too hard to understand). Hierarchical world belief is the primal that is most associated with political ideology, explaining 20 times more variance in political ideology than low Safe world belief.

The following diagram of the structure of primal world beliefs is from a 2021 article by Jeremy D. W. Clifton and Peter Meindl:

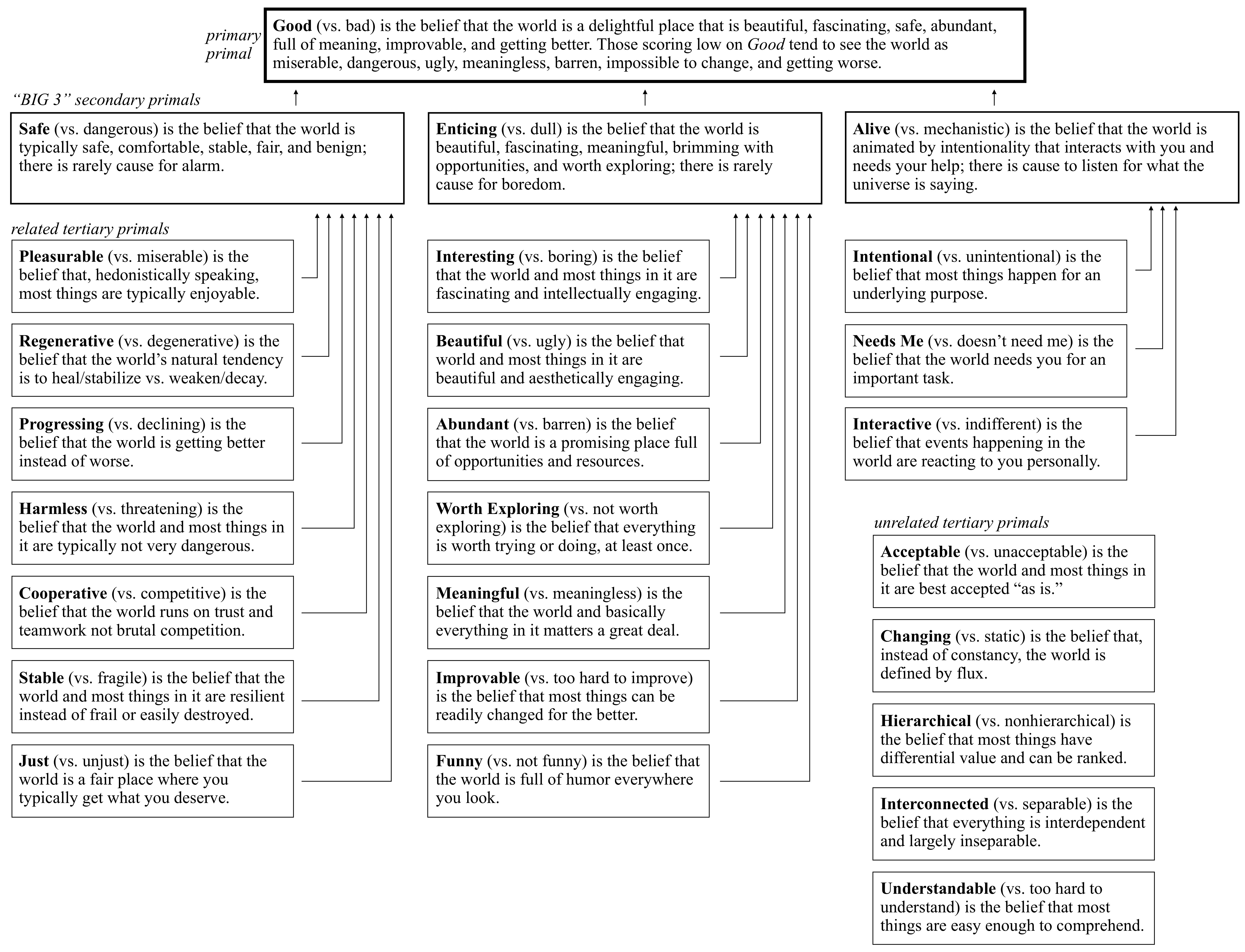
This figure provides definitions for each of the 26 primal world beliefs, and illustrates their basic structure (note five tertiary primals that are largely independent).

== See also ==
- Cognitive therapy § Cognitive model
- Coherence therapy § Hierarchical organization of constructs
- Constructivism (psychological school)
- Cultural schema theory
- Personal construct theory
- Schema (psychology)
  - Dysfunctional schema
  - List of maladaptive schemas
