= Theories of victimology =

Victimology is the study of crime victims and their circumstances, including the factors contributing to (and after-effects of) their victimization. To do this, one would also have to study how the criminals grew interested in their victims and their relationships with them. And they also look into the norms of the society in which the criminal lives and how a victim might fit a specific pattern. Victimology has a broad range of different theories; the most prevalent one is abuse.

Various theories of victimology exist, each to explain why certain people become victims of crimes, and why others do not. Some people view some theories in a negative light, believing that to conjecture as to the causes of victimization is tantamount to blaming the victim for crime, at least partly.

== Abuse in general ==
The lifestyle/exposure theory is a model of victimology that posits that the likelihood an individual will suffer a personal victimization depends heavily upon the concept of lifestyle. Most victims are victimised at night. The lifestyle theory is constructed upon several premises. The most important of the premises are:

- The uneven distribution of criminal victimization across space and time. This translates to the occurrence of high-risk places and high-risk times.
- Offenders do not constitute a representative sample of the general population. This translates to the occurrence of high-risk persons.
- Lifestyle determines the likelihood of personal victimization through the intervening variables of exposure and association.
- People are not equally exposed to high-risk places and times, and they vary in the degree to which they associate with high-risk persons. This translates to a person's lifestyle influencing the exposure and association with low-risk persons.

== Abuse towards women ==
The interpersonal model describes violence against women as a consequence of individual psychology and abnormal interpersonal relations.

The family violence model explains the phenomenon more in terms of socioeconomic and educational factors.

Finally, the gender-politics model is an attempt to schematise abuse of women as attempts by males in general to maintain their position of power over females.

== See also ==
- Abuse
- Victimology

== Bibliography ==
- Rosenberg, Mark L.; Mary Ann Fenley (1991). Violence in America: a public health approach. Oxford University Press US. ISBN 978-0-19-506437-7.
