= Gerard Lopez =

Gerard Lopez may refer to:

- Gerard López (born 1979), Spanish retired footballer
- Gérard Lopez (psychiatrist) (born 1949), French psychiatrist
- Gérard Lopez (businessman) (born 1971), Luxembourgish-Spanish entrepreneur and businessman
