= Perversion =

Type of human behavior

Perversion is a form of human behavior which is far from what is considered to be orthodox or normal. Although the term perversion can refer to a variety of forms of deviation, it is most often used to describe sexual behaviors that are considered particularly abnormal, repulsive or obsessive. Perversion usually differs from "deviant behavior", in that the latter covers areas of behavior (such as petty crime) for which perversion would be too strong a term. It is often considered derogatory, and, in psychological literature, the term paraphilia has been used as a replacement for most forms of sexual perversion, though this clinical term is controversial, and deviation is sometimes used in its place.

== History of concept ==
One view is that the concept of perversion is subjective, and its application varies depending on the individual. Another view considers that perversion is a degradation of an objectively true morality. Originating in the 1660s, a pervert was originally defined as "one who has forsaken a doctrine or system regarded as true, apostate." The sense of a pervert as a sexual term was derived in 1896, and applied originally to variants of sexualities or sexual behavior believed harmful by the individual or group using the term. There is a transition to the sexual in 'the technique of purposeful perversion' of conversational remarks: "Purposeful perversion of what a woman has said ... is a long step closer to a direct attempt at seduction or rape."

The noun sometimes occurs in abbreviated slang form as "perv" and used as a verb meaning "to act like a pervert", and the adjective "pervy" also occurs. All are often, but not exclusively, used non-seriously.

== Non-sexual usages ==
The verb pervert is less narrow in reference than the related nouns, and can be used without any sexual connotations. It is used in English law for the crime of perverting the course of justice which is a common law offence. Further, it can be related to a decision made that is at complete variance of the facts and / or the law to such an extent as to be wholly unreasonable — perverse verdict.

In economics, the term "perverse incentive" means a policy that results in an effect contrary to the policymakers' intention.

== Sexual usages ==
=== Freud on the role of perversion ===
Freud's didactic strategy in his Three Essays on the Theory of Sexuality was to construct a bridge between the "perversions" and "normal" sexuality. Clinically exploring "a richly diversified collection of erotic endowments and inclinations: hermaphroditism, pedophilia, sodomy, fetishism, exhibitionism, sadism, masochism, coprophilia, necrophilia" among them, Freud concluded that "all humans are innately perverse". He found the roots of such perversions in infantile sexuality—in 'the child's "polymorphously perverse" inclinations ... the "aptitude" for such perversity is innate'. The 'crucial irony of Freud's account in the Three Essays was that perversion in childhood was the norm'. Refining his analysis a decade later, Freud stressed that while childhood sexuality involved a wide and unfocused range of perverse activities, by contrast with adult perversion there was 'an important difference between them. Perverse sexuality is as a rule excellently centred: all its activities are directed to an aim—usually a single one; one component instinct has gained the upper hand...In that respect there is no difference between perverse and normal sexuality other than the fact that their dominating component instincts and consequently their sexual aims are different. In both of them, one might say, a well-organized tyranny has been established, but in each of the two a different family has seized the reins of power'.

A few years later, in "A Child is Being Beaten" (1919), Freud laid greater stress on the fact that perversions "go through a process of development, that they represent an end-product and not an initial manifestation ... that the sexual aberrations of childhood, as well as those of mature life, are ramifications of the same complex"—the Oedipus complex. Otto Fenichel took up the point about the defensive function of perversions—of "experiences of sexual satisfactions which simultaneously gave a feeling of security by denying or contradicting some fear"; adding that while "some people think that perverts are enjoying some kind of more intense sexual pleasure than normal people. This is not true ... [though] neurotics, who have repressed perverse longings, may envy the perverts who express the perverse longings openly".

=== Perversion in women ===
Freud wrote extensively on perversion in men. However, he and his successors paid scant attention to perversion in women. In 2003, psychologist, psychoanalyst and feminist Arlene Kramer Richards published a seminal paper on female perversion, "A Fresh look at Perversion", in the Journal of the American Psychoanalytic Association. In 2015, psychoanalyst Lynn Friedman, in a review of The Complete Works of Arlene Richards in the Journal of the American Psychoanalytic Association, noted prior to that time, "virtually no analysts were writing about female perversion. This pioneering work undoubtedly paved the way for others, including Louise Kaplan (1991), to explore this relatively uncharted territory."

=== The permissive society ===
With the sexual revolution of the later twentieth century, much that Freud had argued for became part of a new wide-ranging liberal consensus. At times this might lead to a kind of Panglossian world view where every fetishist has his "fetishera ... for every man who is hung up on shoes, there is a woman ready to cater for and groove with him, and for every man who gets his thrills from hair, there is a woman who gets hers from having her locks raped. Havelock Ellis has many cases of this meeting of the minds: the man who yearns to get pressed on by high heels sooner or later meets the woman who has daydreamed all her life of heel-pressing".

Where internal controversy did arise in the liberal consensus was about the exact relation of variations to normal development—some considering in the wake of Freud that "these different sexual orientations can best be explained and understood by comparison with normal development", and highlighting the fear of intimacy in perversion as "a kind of sex ... which is hedged about with special conditions ... puts a vast distance between the partners". From such a standpoint, "whatever the deviant impulse or fantasy may be, that's where the real, true, loving sexuality is hidden"—a point of transition perhaps to some of the bleaker post-permissive visions of perversion.

=== Critical views ===
For some participants, "Liberation, at least in its sexual form, was a new kind of imposed morality, quite as restricting" as what had gone before—one that "took very little account of the complexity of human emotional connections". New, more skeptical currents of disenchantment with perversion emerged as a result (alongside more traditional condemnations) in both the French-speaking and English-speaking worlds.

Lacan had early highlighted "the ambivalence proper to the 'partial drives' of scoptophilia, sadomasochism ... the often very little 'realised' aspect of the apprehension of others in the practice of certain of these perversions". In his wake, others would stress how "there is always, in any perverse act, an aspect of rape, in the sense that the Other must find himself drawn into the experience despite himself ... a loss or abandonment of subjectivity."

Similarly, object relations theory would point to the way "in perversion there is the refusal, the terror of strangeness"; to the way "the 'pervert' ... attacks imaginative elaboration through compulsive action with an accomplice; and this is done to mask psychic pain". Empirical studies would find "in the perverse relationships described...an absolute absence of any shared pleasures"; while at the theoretical level "perversions involve—the theory tells us—an attempted denial of the difference between the sexes and the generations", and include "the wish to damage and dehumanize ... the misery of the driven, damaging life".

== See also ==
- David Morgan (psychologist)
- Fixed fantasy
- Hentai
- Kink (sexual)
- Lascivious behavior
- Richard von Krafft-Ebing
- Robert J. Stoller
- Voyeurism
