= Anna Costanza Baldry =

Italian social psychologist (1970–2019)

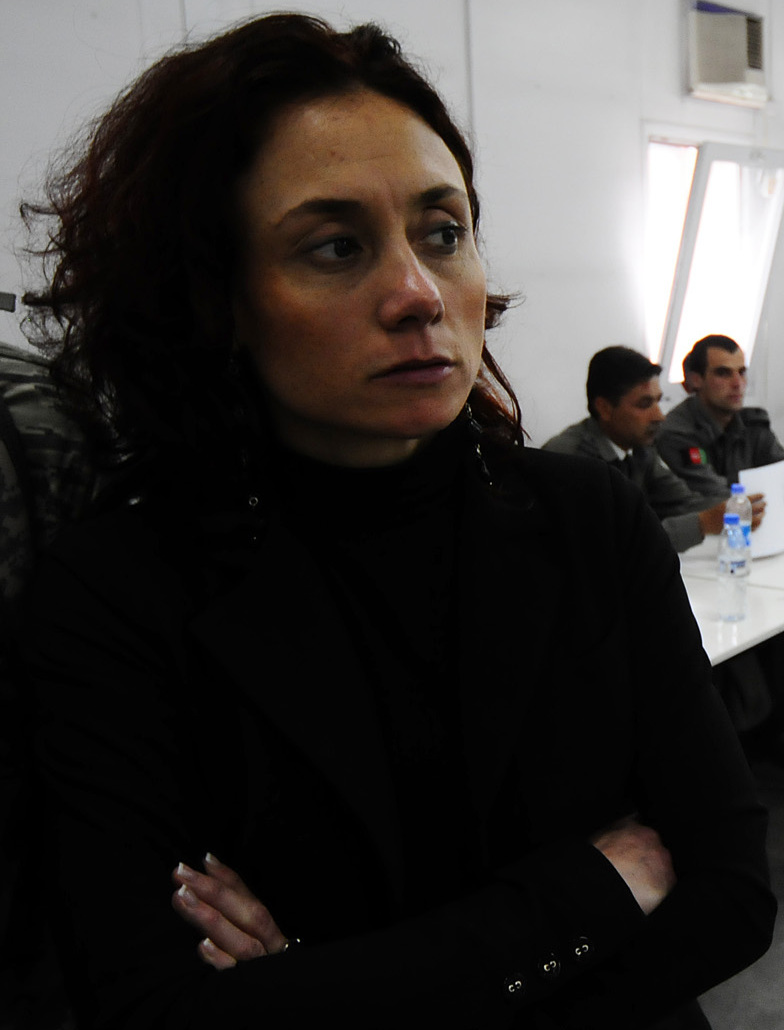
- Baldry in 2010
- Born: 16 May 1970; London, England, UK
- Died: 9 March 2019 (aged 48); Rome, Italy

Academic background
- Education: Sapienza University of Rome; University of Cambridge
- Doctoral advisor: David P. Farrington

Academic work
- Discipline: Criminology
- Institutions: Università degli Studi della Campania Luigi Vanvitelli; Catholic University of Milan

Anna Costanza Baldry (16 May 1970 – 9 March 2019) was an Italian social psychologist and criminologist. She was a professor at Università degli Studi della Campania Luigi Vanvitelli. An expert on issues related to violence against women and children, Baldry consulted with organizations such as the United Nations and NATO. For her contributions to society, she was awarded the Order of Merit of the Italian Republic.

== Biography ==
Baldry was born in London, on 16 May 1970. She attended Sapienza University of Rome, earning an undergraduate degree in psychology in 1994, and a PhD in social psychology in 1999. She studied criminology at the University of Cambridge, earning a master's degree in 1996, and a PhD in 2001, under the supervision of David Farrington. From 2003 to 2004, she completed a post-doctoral fellowship at the Free University of Amsterdam, having been awarded funding from Marie Skłodowska-Curie Actions. From 2005, she taught courses in psychology and criminology at Università degli Studi della Campania Luigi Vanvitelli. She also taught victimology at Catholic University of Milan.

Baldry conducted research and consulted on topics related to aggression and relationships, including child and adolescent bullying, cyberbullying, and gender-based violence. She led a number of prevention and intervention projects, including the development of Threat Assessment of Bullying Behaviors among Youngsters (TABBY), a bullying intervention program implemented in eight countries, and the validation of the Spousal Assault Risk Assessment (SARA) protocol in Italy. She also provided training on violence to law enforcement, social workers, and other service providers, and served as an expert consultant to such organization as the United Nations, OSCE and NATO.

In 2015, she was awarded the Order of Merit of the Italian Republic by President Sergio Mattarella, the country's highest honour.

Baldry died on 9 March 2019.

== Selected works ==
- Baldry AC, Farrington DP (2000). "Bullies and delinquents: Personal characteristics and parental styles". Journal of Community & Applied Social Psychology. 10 (1): 17–31. doi:10.1002/(SICI)1099-1298(200001/02)10:1<17::AID-CASP526>3.0.CO;2-M.
- Baldry AC (July 2003). "Bullying in schools and exposure to domestic violence". Child Abuse & Neglect. 27 (7): 713–32. doi:10.1016/s0145-2134(03)00114-5. PMID 14627075.
- Baldry AC (2004). "The impact of direct and indirect bullying on the mental and physical health of Italian youngsters". Aggressive Behavior. 30 (5): 343–355. doi:10.1002/ab.20043.
- Baldry AC, Farrington DP (2004). "Evaluation of an intervention program for the reduction of bullying and victimization in schools". Aggressive Behavior. 30 (1): 1–15. doi:10.1002/ab.20000.
- Baldry AC, Winkel FW (2008). Intimate partner violence prevention and intervention: The risk assessment and management approach. New York: Nova Science Publishers. ISBN 978-1-60021-858-3.
- Baldry AC, Pacilli MG, Pagliaro S (May 2015). "She's not a person...she's just a woman! Infra-humanization and intimate partner violence". Journal of Interpersonal Violence. 30 (9): 1567–82. doi:10.1177/0886260514540801. PMID 24986191. S2CID 43066530.
