= Clandestine abuse =

Hidden abuse

Clandestine abuse is sexual, psychological, or physical abuse "that is kept secret for a purpose, concealed, or underhanded."

Child sexual abuse is often kept secret:

A victim of child sexual abuse is under a great deal of pressure to keep the abuse secret. In many cases of child molestation, the molester has threatened to harm the child or a member of the child's family. The molester might have told the child that he would not be believed even if the child did tell. Another common situation is that the molester will tell the child that if the child tells about the abuse, he will get into trouble. The clear message is given to the child that if another person finds out, something bad will happen to the child. This pressure to maintain silence can often be successfully overcome by establishing open communication between children and adults through a proper educational program for children.

== Prevention ==
While it is not always possible to stop every case of clandestine abuse, it may be possible to prevent many incidents through policies in youth organizations.

The social isolation model asserts that:

Violence is possible where a victim is isolated and violent behavior and its effects are unlikely to come to light. The "two-deep" policy of the Boy Scouts of America requires that a minimum of two adults be present during all activities to minimize the potential for clandestine abuse.

The BSA policy states:

The Boy Scouts of America has adopted a number of policies aimed at eliminating opportunities for abuse within the Scouting program. These policies focus on leadership selection and on placing barriers to abuse within the program.... ... Two-deep leadership [means that] Two registered adult leaders or one registered leader and a parent of a participant, one of whom must be 21 years of age or older, are required on all trips and outings. The chartered organization is responsible for ensuring that sufficient leadership is provided for all activities.

Other policies of the BSA state:

One-on-one contact between adults and youth members is not permitted. In situations that require personal conferences, such as a Scoutmaster's conference, the meeting is to be conducted in view of other adults and youths.... Adult leaders must respect the privacy of youth members in situations such as changing clothes and taking showers at camp, and intrude only to the extent that health and safety require. Adults must protect their own privacy in similar situations.... When camping, no youth is permitted to sleep in the tent of an adult other than his own parent or guardian.... The Boy Scouts of America does not recognize any secret organizations as part of its program. All aspects of the Scouting program are open to observation by parents and leaders.

== Drug crimes ==
A person, especially a child, may be abused in secret because the victim has witnessed another clandestine crime, such as a working methamphetamine laboratory. The FBI concluded that "A coordinated multidisciplinary team is critical to ensure that the needs of meth’s youngest victims are met and that adequate information is available to prosecute child endangerment cases successfully."

== See also ==
- Cruelty
- Emotional blackmail
- Victimology
