= Sarah Ben-David =

- שרה בן-דוד
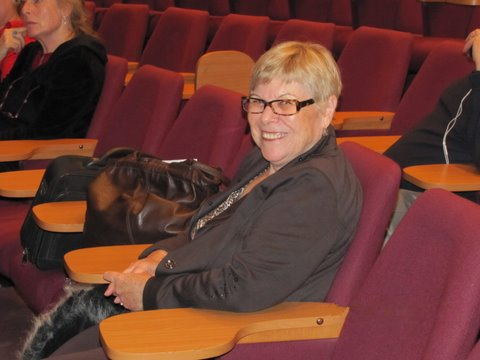
- Born: Tel Aviv, Israel
- Occupation: sociologist
- Writing career
- Genre: criminologist

This article is an autobiography or has been extensively edited by the subject or by someone connected to the subject. It may need editing to conform to Wikipedia's neutral point of view policy. There may be relevant discussion on the talk page.(September 2025) (Learn how and when to remove this message)

Sarah Ben-David (Hebrew: שרה בן-דוד) is an Israeli Professor of Criminology whose scientific and public activity focuses mainly on victimology and criminology and overlapping areas between these two fields.

== Biography ==
Sarah Ben-David began her undergraduate studies in Sociology and Economics at the Tel Aviv branch of the Hebrew University of Jerusalem. She received her master's degree in education, graduating with honors from Tel Aviv University, and completed her doctoral studies at Bar-Ilan University. Upon completing her masters' studies, Ben-David became the coordinator of research in the Department of Criminology at the University of Tel Aviv, and in Mental Health Center in Ayalon Prison.

== Activities ==
She founded and led three organizations:

- Sha'al - victims' assistance service, an association founded in 1979 that was a pioneer in promoting the field of victim care.
- El'am - Sex Crime Prevention Association, an organization that promoted the professional treatment of sex offenders, and promoted legislation.
- Keleth - Criminologists for correctional services. In this association, Ben-David and her colleagues established the first center for sex offenders in the community.

In Ariel University Center of Samaria, Ben David was among the founders of the Department of Criminology and has served as head of the department since its establishment. The Department currently has about 300 students. Since 2010, the department has been conducting study days and editing a book on female criminality and female domestic violence. She currently serves as Head of the Department of Criminology and is engaged in research in the field of family, women and crime and various approaches regarding the treatment for violence.

=== Conferences and publications in the field of domestic violence ===
The Department of Criminology under Prof. Ben-David, in collaboration with Dr. Yoav Mazeh of the Ono Academic College, is working on a book called "Silent Violence" with Dr. Yael Aviad as the editor in chief. The book will address women's violence against men in relationships. In an interview with Gal Gabbai in the television program "Creating a New Order" on Israel Educational Television (19.11.2012) Ben-David pointed to the silencing of studies that contradict the claim that only men are violent in relationships, and noted that she even received threats before the "Pink Crime" conference: "We received threats that if we conduct the conference it will be disrupted by force, protests will be organized, etc."

=== Day center for treatment of sex offenders in the community ===
Ben-David has worked in the field of offenders' treatment in researching and processing of scientific material, in order to obtain sponsorship and support for the establishment of a day center for sex offenders' treatment and research. The center currently operates under the Ministry of Social Affairs.

The establishment of the center was due to the understanding that treatment of sex offenders and the prevention of sex crimes are a vital social need, and that in order to protect society and provide alternative coping patterns for criminals, a solution within the community is necessary. The center is located in the central district of Israel and is designed to provide the population of men aged 18 and above who meet certain criteria and who committed sexual offenses, or offenses with a sexual nature. The center has operated since 2005 and provides a unique solution for sex offenders.

In recent years Ben-David and her colleagues are involved in planning a Center for Family Peace, which will provide courses and seminars for the community at large and to professionals; treatment and mediation for couples and children in families where there is a conflict, and research and teaching in the field of family violence and conflict mediation.
