= International Society for Justice Research =

The International Society for Justice Research (ISJR) is an interdisciplinary scholarly scientific organization dedicated to the interdisciplinary study of justice and the related phenomena of morality and ethics. ISJR fosters international and interdisciplinary collaboration and promotes the exchange of new ideas, research, and theories related to justice and these related phenomena. ISJR facilitates such collaboration and exchange and the dissemination of knowledge through the publication of an academic journal Social Justice Research, the conduct of biennial scientific conferences, regular newsletters, and informal discussion by means of a listserv. Through these activities ISJR connects scholars in a wide variety of disciplines and geographic locations who are all focused on the study of justice. Scholars from a host of fields, including social psychology, sociology, economics, ethology and animal behavior, history, law and others are represented among the society's membership.

== History ==
Early steps towards the establishment of ISJR were taken when the social psychologist Melvin J. Lerner accepted the Cleveringa Chair at the University of Leiden in 1984. His visit and the exchanges it facilitated led to a First International Conference on Social Justice in Human Relations, organized by Riel Vermunt in Leiden in 1986.

A Second International Conference followed in 1988, again organized by Riel Vermunt in Leiden, at which the idea of a research center took shape, furthered in particular by Melvin Lerner, Herman Steensma, and Riel Vermunt. In 1989, a Center for Social Justice Research was formed cooperatively between the Universities of Leiden, Waterloo and Utrecht, with Melvin Lerner as director, and Piet Hermkens and Riel Vermunt as associate directors.

Further International Conferences were held in Utrecht, Netherlands (1991), Trier, Germany (1993), and Reno, NV, USA (1995), before at a sixth conference in Potsdam, Germany, in 1997, Leo Montada was charged with transforming the scientific network into an institutionalized association: the International Society for Justice Research. Founding members of ISJR were Ron Cohen, Karen Cook, Ron Dillehay, Russel Hardin, Melvin Lerner, Gerold Mikula, Leo Montada (founding president), Tom Tyler, and Riel Vermunt.

== Aims of the Society ==
Questions about justice, which have occupied many scholars across different scientific disciplines for centuries, are ubiquitous in interpersonal relations, within and between communities, social groups, organizations, and states. They are at the core of social conflicts and essential for sustainable conflict resolutions. Given the importance of justice issues in everyday life, ISJR was founded with the aim of advancing justice research in every way. Its mission is to further three main goals:

1. To provide biennial scientific meetings and further opportunities for the scientific exchange of theoretical developments and recent research on justice-related issues
2. To foster productive discussions of new ideas, basic and applied research, and theories relevant to justice
3. To facilitate international and interdisciplinary cooperation in justice theory and research.

== Meetings ==
The society meets biennially as a forum for the exchange and discussion of knowledge related to the multiple facets of justice and fairness. Information about upcoming and past meetings is available at http://www.isjr.org/conference/

== Journal ==
The journal Social Justice Research (SJR) was founded in 1987 by Melvin Lerner to publish work related to the growing field. The journal is published quarterly.

Social Justice Research is abstracted and indexed in the Social Sciences Citation Index. According to the Journal Citation Reports, the journal has a 2016 impact factor of 0.796.

The journal is explicitly interdisciplinary, covering research from psychology, sociology, anthropology, economics, social policy research, political science, law, management science, and other fields that relates to the origins, structures, and consequences of justice in human affairs.

== Awards ==
The ISJR Lifetime Achievement Award is presented bi-annually to honor distinguished lifetime contributions to the scientific study of justice and for efforts to advance justice as a field of study.

The ISJR Early Career Contribution Award is presented bi-annually to an accomplished young researcher in order to foster, encourage, and support excellence in justice-related scholarship.

The Morton Deutsch Award is presented annually for the best article published in the society’s journal, Social Justice Research, every year, with preference given to contributions from investigators who are early in their research careers. The award is named after one of the society’s most prolific and influential contributors, Morton Deutsch.

== See also ==
- Moral psychology
- Peace psychology
- Society for the Psychological Study of Social Issues
