= Just-world fallacy =

Idea that everyone faces consequence as they deserve

The just-world fallacy, or just-world hypothesis, is the cognitive bias that assumes that "people get what they deserve" – that actions will necessarily have morally fair and fitting consequences for the actor. For example, the assumptions that noble actions will eventually be rewarded and evil actions will eventually be punished fall under this fallacy. In other words, the just-world fallacy is the tendency to attribute consequences to – or expect consequences as the result of – either a universal force that restores moral balance or a universal connection between the nature of actions and their results. This belief generally implies the existence of cosmic justice, destiny, divine providence, desert, stability, order, or karma. It is often associated with a variety of fundamental fallacies, especially in regard to rationalizing suffering on the grounds that the sufferers "deserve" it. This is called victim blaming.

This fallacy popularly appears in the English language in various figures of speech that imply guaranteed punishment for wrongdoing, such as: "you got what was coming to you", "what goes around comes around", "chickens come home to roost", "everything happens for a reason", "you reap what you sow", and "you brought this on yourself." This hypothesis has been widely studied by social psychologists since Melvin J. Lerner conducted seminal work on the belief in a just world in the early 1960s. Research has continued since then, examining the predictive capacity of the fallacy in various situations and across cultures, and clarifying and expanding the theoretical understandings of just-world beliefs.

== Emergence ==
Many philosophers and social theorists have observed and considered the phenomenon of belief in a just world, going back to at least as early as the Pyrrhonist philosopher Sextus Empiricus, writing c. 180 CE, who argued against this belief. Jesus also condemned something like this belief in Luke 13:4, saying that people killed by the falling of the tower of Siloam were not worse sinners than other as his interlocutors supposedly believed. Lerner's work made the just-world hypothesis a focus of research in the field of social psychology.

=== Melvin Lerner ===
Lerner was prompted to study justice beliefs and the just-world fallacy in the context of social psychological inquiry into negative social and societal interactions. Lerner saw his work as extending Stanley Milgram's work on obedience. He sought to answer the questions of how regimes that cause cruelty and suffering maintain popular support, and how people come to accept social norms and laws that produce misery and suffering.

Lerner's inquiry was influenced by repeatedly witnessing the tendency of observers to blame victims for their suffering. During his clinical training as a psychologist, he observed treatment of mentally ill persons by the health care practitioners with whom he worked. Although Lerner knew them to be kindhearted, educated people, they often blamed patients for the patients' own suffering. Lerner also describes his surprise at hearing his students derogate (disparage, belittle) the poor, seemingly oblivious to the structural forces that contribute to poverty. The desire to understand the processes that caused these phenomena led Lerner to conduct his first experiments on what is now called the just-world fallacy.

== Early evidence ==
In 1966, Lerner and his colleagues began a series of experiments that used shock paradigms to investigate observer responses to victimization. In the first of these experiments conducted at the University of Kansas, 72 female participants watched what appeared to be a confederate receiving electrical shocks for her errors during a learning task (learning pairs of nonsense syllables). Initially, these observing participants were upset by the victim's apparent suffering. But as the suffering continued and observers remained unable to intervene, the observers began to reject and devalue the victim. Rejection and devaluation of the victim was greater when the observed suffering was greater. But when participants were told the victim would receive compensation for her suffering, the participants did not derogate the victim. Lerner and colleagues replicated these findings in subsequent studies, as did other researchers.

== Theory ==
To explain these studies' findings, it was theorized that there was a prevalent belief in a just world. A just world is one in which actions and conditions have predictable, appropriate consequences. These actions and conditions are typically individuals' behaviors or attributes. The specific conditions that correspond to certain consequences are socially determined by a society's norms and ideologies. Lerner presents the belief in a just world as functional: it maintains the idea that one can influence the world in a predictable way. Belief in a just world functions as a sort of "contract" with the world regarding the consequences of behavior. This allows people to plan for the future and engage in effective, goal-driven behavior. Lerner summarized his findings and his theoretical work in his 1980 monograph The Belief in a Just World: A Fundamental Delusion.

Lerner hypothesized that the belief in a just world is crucially important for people to maintain for their own well-being. But people are confronted daily with evidence that the world is not just: people suffer without apparent cause. Lerner explained that people use strategies to eliminate threats to their belief in a just world. These strategies can be rational or irrational. Rational strategies include accepting the reality of injustice, trying to prevent injustice or provide restitution, and accepting one's own limitations. Non-rational strategies include denial, withdrawal, and reinterpretation of the event.

There are a few modes of reinterpretation that could make an event fit the belief in a just world. One can reinterpret the outcome, the cause, and/or the character of the victim. In the case of observing the injustice of the suffering of innocent people, one major way to rearrange the cognition of an event is to interpret the victim of suffering as deserving. Specifically, observers can blame victims for their suffering on the basis of their behaviors and/or their characteristics. Much psychological research on the belief in a just world has focused on these negative social phenomena of victim blaming and victim derogation in different contexts.

An additional effect of this thinking is that individuals experience less personal vulnerability because they do not believe they have done anything to deserve or cause negative outcomes. This is related to the self-serving bias observed by social psychologists.

Many researchers have interpreted just-world beliefs as an example of causal attribution. In victim blaming, the causes of victimization are attributed to an individual rather than to a situation. Thus, the consequences of belief in a just world may be related to or explained in terms of particular patterns of causal attribution.

== Alternatives ==
=== Veridical judgment ===
Others have suggested alternative explanations for the derogation of victims. One suggestion is that derogation effects are based on accurate judgments of a victim's character. In particular, in relation to Lerner's first studies, some have hypothesized that it would be logical for observers to derogate an individual who would allow himself to be shocked without reason. A subsequent study by Lerner challenged this alternative hypothesis by showing that individuals are only derogated when they actually suffer; individuals who agreed to undergo suffering but did not were viewed positively.

=== Guilt reduction ===
Another alternative explanation offered for the derogation of victims early in the development of the just-world fallacy was that observers derogate victims to reduce their own feelings of guilt. Observers may feel responsible, or guilty, for a victim's suffering if they themselves are involved in the situation or experiment. In order to reduce the guilt, they may devalue the victim. Lerner and colleagues claim that there has not been adequate evidence to support this interpretation. They conducted one study that found derogation of victims occurred even by observers who were not implicated in the process of the experiment and thus had no reason to feel guilty.

=== Discomfort reduction ===
Alternatively, victim derogation and other strategies may only be ways to alleviate discomfort after viewing suffering. This would mean that the primary motivation is not to restore a belief in a just world, but to reduce discomfort caused by empathizing. Studies have shown that victim derogation does not suppress subsequent helping activity and that empathizing with the victim plays a large role when assigning blame. According to Ervin Staub, devaluing the victim should lead to lesser compensation if restoring belief in a just world was the primary motive; instead, there is virtually no difference in compensation amounts whether the compensation precedes or follows devaluation. Psychopathy has been linked to the lack of just-world maintaining strategies, possibly due to dampened emotional reactions and lack of empathy.

== Additional evidence ==
After Lerner's first studies, other researchers replicated these findings in other settings in which individuals are victimized. This work, which began in the 1970s and continues today, has investigated how observers react to victims of random calamities like traffic accidents, as well as rape and domestic violence, illnesses, and poverty. Generally, researchers have found that observers of the suffering of innocent victims tend to both derogate and blame victims for their suffering. Observers thus maintain their belief in a just world by changing their cognitions about the victims' character.

In the early 1970s, social psychologists Zick Rubin and Letitia Anne Peplau developed a measure of belief in a just world. This measure and its revised form published in 1975 allowed for the study of individual differences in just-world beliefs. Much of the subsequent research on the just-world hypothesis used these measurement scales.

These studies on victims of violence, illness, and poverty and others like them have provided consistent support for the link between observers' just-world beliefs and their tendency to blame victims for their suffering. As a result, the existence of the just-world hypothesis as a psychological phenomenon has become widely accepted.

=== Violence ===
Researchers have looked at how observers react to victims of rape and other violence. In a formative experiment on rape and belief in a just world by Linda Carli and colleagues, researchers gave two groups of subjects a narrative about interactions between a man and a woman. The description of the interaction was the same until the end; one group received a narrative that had a neutral ending and the other group received a narrative that ended with the man raping the woman. Subjects judged the rape ending as inevitable and blamed the woman in the narrative for the rape on the basis of her behavior, but not her characteristics. These findings have been replicated repeatedly, including using a rape ending and a "happy ending" (a marriage proposal).

Other researchers have found a similar phenomenon for judgments of battered partners. One study found that observers' labels of blame of female victims of relationship violence increase with the intimacy of the relationship. Observers blamed the perpetrator only in the least intimate case of violence, in which a male struck an acquaintance.

=== Bullying ===
Researchers have employed the just-world fallacy to understand bullying. Given other research on beliefs in a just world, it would be expected that observers would derogate and blame bullying victims, but the opposite has been found: individuals high in just-world belief have stronger anti-bullying attitudes. Other researchers have found that strong belief in a just world is associated with lower levels of bullying behavior. This finding is in keeping with Lerner's understanding of belief in a just world as functioning as a "contract" that governs behavior. There is additional evidence that belief in a just world is protective of the well-being of children and adolescents in the school environment, as has been shown for the general population.

=== Illness ===
Other researchers have found that observers judge sick people as responsible for their illnesses. One experiment showed that persons suffering from a variety of illnesses were derogated on a measure of attractiveness more than healthy individuals were. In comparison to healthy people, victim derogation was found for persons presenting with indigestion, pneumonia, and stomach cancer. Moreover, derogation was found to be higher for those suffering from more severe illnesses, except for those presenting with cancer. Stronger belief in a just world has also been found to correlate with greater derogation of AIDS victims.

=== Poverty ===
More recently, researchers have explored how people react to poverty through the lens of the just-world fallacy. Strong belief in a just world is associated with blaming the poor, with weak belief in a just world associated with identifying external causes of poverty including world economic systems, war, and exploitation.

=== The self as victim ===
Some research on belief in a just world has examined how people react when they themselves are victimized. An early paper by Dr. Ronnie Janoff-Bulman found that rape victims often blame their own behavior, but not their own characteristics, for their victimization. It was hypothesized that this may be because blaming one's own behavior makes an event more controllable.

== Theoretical refinement ==
Subsequent work on measuring belief in a just world has focused on identifying multiple dimensions of the belief. This work has resulted in the development of new measures of just-world belief and additional research. Hypothesized dimensions of just-world beliefs include belief in an unjust world, beliefs in immanent justice and ultimate justice, hope for justice, and belief in one's ability to reduce injustice. Other work has focused on looking at the different domains in which the belief may function; individuals may have different just-world beliefs for the personal domain, the sociopolitical domain, the social domain, etc. An especially fruitful distinction is between the belief in a just world for the self (personal) and the belief in a just world for others (general). These distinct beliefs are differentially associated with positive mental health.

== Correlates ==
Researchers have used measures of belief in a just world to look at correlates of high and low levels of belief in a just world.

Limited studies have examined ideological correlates of the belief in a just world. These studies have found sociopolitical correlates of just-world beliefs, including right-wing authoritarianism and the Protestant work ethic. Studies have also found belief in a just world to be correlated with aspects of religiosity.

Studies of demographic differences, including gender and racial differences, have not shown systematic differences, but do suggest racial differences, with black people and African Americans having the lowest levels of belief in a just world.

The development of measures of just-world beliefs has also allowed researchers to assess cross-cultural differences in just-world beliefs. Much research conducted shows that beliefs in a just world are evident cross-culturally. One study tested beliefs in a just world of students in 12 countries. This study found that in countries where the majority of inhabitants are powerless, belief in a just world tends to be weaker than in other countries. This supports the theory of the just-world fallacy because the powerless have had more personal and societal experiences that provided evidence that the world is not just and predictable.

Belief in an unjust world has been linked to increased self-handicapping, criminality, defensive coping, anger and perceived future risk. It may also serve as an ego-protective belief for certain individuals by justifying maladaptive behavior.

== Current research ==
Although much of the initial work on belief in a just world focused on its negative social effects, other research suggests that belief in a just world is good, and even necessary, for mental health. Belief in a just world is associated with greater life satisfaction and well-being and less depressive affect. Researchers are actively exploring the reasons why the belief in a just world might have this relationship to mental health; it has been suggested that such beliefs could be a personal resource or coping strategy that buffers stress associated with daily life and with traumatic events. This hypothesis suggests that belief in a just world can be understood as a positive illusion. In line with this perspective, recent research also suggests that belief in a just world may explain the known statistical association between religiosity/spirituality and psychological well-being. Some belief in a just world research has been conducted within the framework of primal world beliefs, and has found strong correlations between just world belief and beliefs that the world is safe, abundant and cooperative (among other qualities).

Some studies also show that beliefs in a just world are correlated with internal locus of control. Strong belief in a just world is associated with greater acceptance of and less dissatisfaction with negative events in one's life. This may be one way in which belief in a just world affects mental health. Others have suggested that this relationship holds only for beliefs in a just world for oneself. Beliefs in a just world for others are related instead to the negative social phenomena of victim blaming and victim derogation observed in other studies.

Belief in a just world has also been found to negatively predict the perceived likelihood of kin favoritism. The perspective of the individual plays an important role in this relationship, such that when people imagine themselves as mere observers of injustice, general belief in a just world will be the stronger predictor, and when they imagine themselves as victims of injustice, personal belief in a just world will be the stronger predictor. This further supports the distinction between general and personal belief in a just world.

=== International research ===
More than 40 years after Lerner's seminal work on belief in a just world, researchers continue to study the phenomenon. Belief in a just world scales have been validated in several countries such as Iran, Russia, Brazil, and France. Work continues primarily in the United States, Europe, Australia, and Asia. Researchers in Germany have contributed disproportionately to recent research. Their work resulted in a volume edited by Lerner and German researcher Leo Montada titled Responses to Victimizations and Belief in a Just World.

== See also ==
- Apocalypse
- Apocalypticism
- "Best of all possible worlds"
  - Gottfried Wilhelm Leibniz
  - Candide
  - Problem of evil
- Denial
- Divine providence
- Divine retribution
- Divine judgement
- Economic inequality
- Fundamental attribution error
- Hindsight bias
- Gender inequality
- Invisible hand
- Karma § Comparable concepts
- Mean world syndrome
- Moralistic fallacy
- Moral luck
- Moral panic
- Myth of meritocracy
- Natural disasters as divine retribution
- Revenge
- Shattered assumptions theory
- Social Darwinism
- Social inequality
- Survivorship bias
- System justification
- The banality of evil
- Theodicy
- Victim blaming
