= Peace psychology =

Subfield of psychology

Peace psychology is a subfield of psychology and peace research that deals with the psychological aspects of peace, conflict, violence, and war. Peace psychology can be characterized by four interconnected pillars: (1) research, (2) education, (3) practice, and (4) advocacy. The first pillar, research, is documented most extensively in this article.

Peace psychological activities are based on psychological models (theories) and methods; they are usually normatively bound in their means and objectives by working towards the ideal of sustainable peace using nonviolent means. Violence and peace can be defined in terms of Johan Galtung's extended conceptualization of peace, according to which peace is not merely the absence of personal (direct) violence and war (= negative peace), but also the absence of structural (indirect) and cultural violence (= positive peace). The ideal of peace can also be conceptualized as the comprehensive implementation of human rights (civil, political, economic, social, and cultural rights); this should, among other purposes, ensure the satisfaction of basic human needs, such as positive personal and social identity, sense of control, security, (social) justice, well-being, a safe environment, and access to adequate food and shelter.

== Research ==
Peace psychological research can be analytically (research on peace) or normatively (research for peace) oriented. Regardless of its analytical or normative orientation, peace psychological research mainly deals with the psychological aspects of the formation, escalation, reduction, and resolution of conflicts (including war), the psychosocial conditions conducive or detrimental to a sustainable peace, and the psychosocial effects of war and violence. In each case, different levels of analysis and explanation are relevant: from the level of individuals to groups, social organizations and institutions, states and state systems (e.g., the European Union), military alliances (e.g., NATO), and collective security systems (e.g., the United Nations and the Organization for Security and Cooperation in Europe [OSCE]).

=== Formation and escalation of conflict ===
Peace psychology focuses on the psychological aspects of the formation, escalation, reduction, and resolution of conflicts. A conflict exists when the expectations, interests, needs, or actions of at least two parties to the conflict are perceived by at least one of the parties to be incompatible. Peace psychology is mainly concerned with conflicts between social groups (intergroup conflicts, such as between ethnic groups, clans, religious groups, states etc.), in terms of domains like power, wealth, access to raw materials and markets, cultural or religious values, honor, dignity, or recognition. In conflicts one has to distinguish between (overt) positions (e.g., "we don't negotiate with X") and underlying interests (e.g., power, spheres of influence and wealth) as well as between current triggers (e.g., violence at a political protest) and systematic, enduring, structural causes (e.g., deprivation of a group's political participation or access to professional employment). Although conflicts are inevitable and can lead to positive change when dealt with constructively, the escalation of conflicts and in particular the occurrence of violence are preventable. Psychological processes of information processing (attention, perception, memory, thinking, judgment), emotion, and motivation influence substantially how a conflict is handled, and in particular whether conflicts escalate to violent episodes. An important factor is the different points of view of the conflict parties, such as when behavior that is based on positive intentions is perceived by the opponent as aggressive and therefore contributes to escalation. Conflicts can easily escalate. A cycle of violence can arise in which both parties are involved, and original victims can become perpetrators, without realizing it ("victim myth").

Conflicts can be intensified specifically through the construction of enemy images, psychological warfare, and propaganda promulgated by the media, political elite, educational systems, socialization, cultural symbols and other means. Enemy images may have a kernel of truth, but overstate the negative sides of the opponent. The core features of a strong enemy image include: (1) a negative evaluation of the opponent (e.g., aggressive, immoral, but also inferior), (2) a one-sided blame for negative events, and (3) a different evaluation of similar actions of one's own side than the enemy ("double standard"; e.g., build-up of arms on one’s own side is self-defense, on the enemy's it is aggression). These constructions can cause dehumanization of the opponent, so that moral standards no longer apply. In extreme cases, it may seem acceptable, even desirable, for the opponent to suffer and be killed. The construction of the enemy image has the central function of justifying armament, violence, and war. In addition, it enhances the individual and collective self-image.

Psychological warfare includes methods of generating or strengthening war support among the civilian population and the military. These methods include disinformation using the media (war propaganda), but also sabotage, displacement, murder, and terror. War propaganda consists of two complementary strategies: (1) repeating, highlighting, and embellishing with detail information that functions to intensify the enemy image or threat perceptions, and (2) ignoring and devaluing information that may lead to de-escalation. In addition, negative behavior of the adversary may be provoked (e.g., by maneuvers at the state borders) or charges that the enemy engaged in heinous acts may be entirely invented (e.g., the Nayirah testimony).

=== Conflict reduction and resolution (peace psychological strategies) ===
Different peace psychological strategies for non-violent conflict resolution are discussed (conflict de-escalation, conflict resolution, conflict transformation). One can distinguish between strategies on the official level (e.g., measures of tension reduction and trust build such as Charles E. Osgood's "Graduated and Reciprocated Initiatives in Tension Reduction" [GRIT], negotiations, mediation), approaches of unofficial diplomacy (interactive problem-solving workshops), and strategies at the level of peace and conflict civil society (e.g., peace journalism, contact between social groups).

==== Official level ====
Osgood's GRIT model was designed as a counter-concept to the arms race in the East-West conflict, in which the former superpowers, USA and USSR, constantly increased the quantity and quality of their arms so that the destruction of humankind by a nuclear war seemed increasingly possible. The GRIT model, in contrast, aimed to de-escalate and create an atmosphere of mutual trust. One party publicly announces and performs a verifiable, concrete step to reduce tension, and asks or invites the other side to do something similar (developing a spiral of trust). Care is taken so that each step does not endanger the safety of one's own side. GRIT was designed to reverse the tension involved in the nuclear arms race by having each side engage in graduated and reciprocal inititiatives. While there is no firm evidence, it has been suggested that U.S. President Kennedy and the Soviet leader Khrushchev based their negotiations after the Cuban Missile Crisis on this concept.

When conflicted parties are engaged in long-lasting, severe conflicts, it can be difficult to have constructive bilateral negotiations. In this case, a third party (e.g., a social scientist or reputed politician) can serve as a mediator in order to facilitate conflict management. Mediators must be well aware of the conflict and its history, should have the confidence of both conflict parties, and need to be familiar with conflict analysis and communication strategies. Important strategies include establishing trust, working out the essential elements of conflict, and possibly dividing the problem so that at least partial solutions can be achieved and violence can be prevented or stopped. Problems arise when mediators are biased and have strong individual interests. Mediation success is more likely if the conflict is moderately intense, the power difference between the parties is low, and the mediators have high prestige (as a person or because of organizational affiliation).

==== Unofficial level ====
In severe, long-lasting conflicts, it may be advisable to intervene at a level below official diplomacy. Interactive problem solving is such an informal approach to bring members of the conflict parties together. These can include citizens who are well-respected from different areas of society, such as media, business, politics, education, or religion. A team of social scientists (e.g., psychologists) initiate and promote a problem-solving process with the elements of conflict diagnosis, generation of alternatives, and development of nonviolent solutions that results in outcomes that are satisfactory to all parties involved. There is the expectation or hope that the participants influence their governments and public opinion so that official negotiations can follow. Psychologically important components of the process are that the respective self and enemy images are corrected. Interactive problem solving was used in particular in the Israel-Palestine conflict by the U.S. psychologist Herbert Kelman and his team.

==== Civil society level ====
Media are often involved in the formation of enemy images and escalation of conflict. Peace journalism, in contrast, has the objective of investigating and using the influence of the media as a means of encouraging the constructive, non-violent resolution of conflict. Key strategies include representing the conflicting parties as well as the conflict and its history appropriately, identifying propaganda, and articulating the suffering of the people.

The collective action and peaceful demonstrations of the population toward peaceful and socially just ends can have an influence on the decisions of those in power – particularly in democracies. Citizens' commitment depends, among other factors, on the existence of opportunities in society, individual value orientations (e.g., valuing non-violence, social justice), the presence of role models, and the perceived probability of success of one's actions.

Contacts between opposing groups (e.g., on the level of municipalities, associations, universities, trade unions) can contribute to building positive relationships and the reduction of prejudice (see contact hypothesis). Conditions associated with the improvement of intergroup relations when groups come in contact with one another include: The actors involved have similar social status; there are common goals that can be achieved through cooperation; and the contacts are supported by authorities in society.

In asymmetric conflicts, where one conflict party is politically, economically, and/or militarily clearly superior, the stronger party may not be interested in a truly sustainable conflict resolution. Under asymmetric conditions, when the root causes of the conflict cannot be sufficiently addressed, structural violence persists. For such situations, approaches have been developed such as nonviolent resistance and liberation psychology, which originated in Latin America and is related to liberation theology.

Nonviolent resistance refers to public, nonviolent behavior directed against injustice; it involves publicly explicating one's own intentions, committing to communicate with the other side, and the willingness to endure negative consequences of one's own actions. Methods of nonviolent resistance range from protests (e.g., demonstrations) to non-cooperation (e.g., strikes, boycotts) to civil resistance. Particularly well known are the actions, speeches, and writings of Mahatma Gandhi and Martin Luther King Jr.

=== Effects of war and violence ===
Peace psychology examines war and violence between groups also with the aim of illustrating the psychological and social costs of war and violence and to document the human suffering caused. The psychological consequences include, in particular, traumatization (mainly of the civilian population, but also members of the military), cognitive and emotional damage, and the destruction of trustful social relationships. Wars often do not resolve the underlying problems; they often provoke new violence and wars. For example, in post-war societies an increased level of family and community violence can be observed. In addition, resources necessary to deal with civilian issues (e.g., education, health, social welfare) are lost. There is still little comprehensive and objective research on the consequences and costs of war.

=== Psychosocial conditions of sustainable peace ===
Even when violence has been stopped or a Peace Treaty reached, to prevent the risk of a renewed escalation, physical and economic reconstruction as well as socio-political and psychosocial interventions are required. These interventions aim to cure psychosocial wounds of war, build trust, develop a common collective memory, recognize past wrongdoing, and achieve reconciliation and/or forgiveness. Examples are trauma therapy and Truth and Reconciliation Commissions.

Also, irrespective of any specific conflict and violence, peace psychological research looks at the psychosocial conditions that hamper or promote sustainable peace. The basic aim is to transform cultures of violence into cultures of peace.

The following cultural characteristics are obstacles to the development of sustainable peace: the view of one's own group (ethnicity, religion, nation, etc.) to be superior and more valuable and others as inferior and of little value (or in the extreme case: no value); the development of enemy images, dehumanization of others, legitimization of violence and damage; underlying beliefs (ideologies) such as ethnocentrism, social dominance orientation, authoritarianism, nationalism, militarism, and an education system that promotes these ideologies; power differentials that are defended or increased by the powerful and that create unequal conditions in areas such as wealth, health, education, and political participation (structural violence).

Among factors conducive to the development of sustainable peace are: the fundamental belief that conflicts are frequent, but that they can be solved without violence and for the benefit of the various conflict parties; the concept of humanism with the features of human dignity, pacifism, empathy, respect, tolerance and solidarity, and respect for all people or for humanity as a whole; critical proximity to one's own group that – in addition to positive identification – also integrates own weaknesses, mistakes, and committed wrongdoings in the collective self-concept.

In the transformation of cultures of violence into cultures of peace the focus on human rights is of high importance. Human rights are inalienable rights that apply to all human beings, without distinction as to sex, color, ethnicity, language, religion, political opinion, or social origin (prohibition of discrimination). The UN Human Rights Charter contains the essential documents of the Universal Declaration of Human Rights (UDHR, 1948) and the Twin Covenants (1966, International Covenant on Economic, Social and Cultural Rights and International Covenant on Civil and Political Rights). The UDHR consists of 30 articles with more than 100 individual rights, including civil and political rights (e.g., right to life, prohibition of torture, right to fair and public trial, right to asylum, freedom of speech, regular elections), but also social, economic, and cultural rights (including the right to work, rest, holidays with pay, protection from unemployment, the right to food, clothing, housing, medical care, and free primary education). Of particular importance in the UN's human rights concept is that all human rights are significant (indivisibility) and that they apply to all people (universality). Psychological research on human rights has mainly examined knowledge, attitudes, and readiness to act in support of human rights. Representative surveys in Germany show that the realization of human rights is considered to be very important, but at the same time knowledge of human rights is low and inaccurate. The results show a "halving" of human rights: Some civil rights are known, while economic and social rights are hardly considered human rights. Of importance in peace psychology are also analyses of whether human rights are used in the sense of peace or whether they are abused for the construction of enemy images or to prepare wars.

== In education ==
Peace psychological findings are used in the content and practice of peace education at various levels, from primary school to secondary and tertiary education (e.g., in the form of peace psychology courses at universities) to vocational training.

== Practice ==
Peace psychology practice refers, for example, to trauma therapeutic work, the implementation of trainings in nonviolent conflict resolution, and activities in such roles as conflict mediator or civil peace worker. Of particular importance is the cooperation between research and practice, such as in the form of evaluation research, to contribute to the continuous improvement of practice.

== See also ==
- International Society for Justice Research
- Moral psychology
- List of peace activists

== Literature ==
=== Overview literature ===
- Bar-Tal, D. (2013). Intractable conflicts: Socio-psychological foundations and dynamics. Cambridge: Cambridge University Press.
- Bar-Tal, D. (Ed.) (2011). Intergroup conflicts and their resolution: A social psychological perspective. New York: Psychology Press.
- Blumberg, H. H., Hare, A. P., & Costin, A. (2006). Peace psychology: A comprehensive introduction. Cambridge: Cambridge University Press.
- Bretherton, D., & Balvin, N. (Eds.) (2012). Peace psychology in Australia. New York: Springer.
- Christie, D. J. (Ed.) (2012). The encyclopedia of peace psychology. Malden, MA: Wiley-Blackwell.
- Christie, D. J., & Pim, J. E. (Eds.) (2012). Nonkilling Psychology. Honolulu, HI: Center for Global Nonkilling. http://nonkilling.org/pdf/nkpsy.pdf
- Christie, D. J., Wagner, R. V., & Winter, D. D. (Eds.) (2001). Peace, conflict, and violence: Peace psychology for the 21st century. Upper Saddle River, NJ: Prentice-Hall. https://web.archive.org/web/20140625170938/http://academic.marion.ohio-state.edu/dchristie/Peace%20Psychology%20Book.html
- Coleman, P. T., & Deutsch, M. (Eds.) (2012). Psychological components of sustainable peace. New York: Springer.
- Deutsch, M., Coleman, P. T., & Marcus, E. C. (2007). The handbook of conflict resolution: Theory and practice (2nd ed.). Hoboken, NJ: Wiley.
- Gal-Ed, H., Dr. (2016). Garden of Peace: Responding to the challenge of a civilization of peace.Journal of Applied Arts & Health, 7(2), 275-288.
- Gal-Ed, H., Dr. (2009). Art and Meaning: ARTiculation as a Modality in Processing Forgiveness and Peace Consciousness, in Kalayjian, A., & Paloutzian, R.F. (Eds.). Peace psychology book series. Forgiveness and reconciliation: Psychological pathways to conflict transformation and peace building. New York: Springer Science + Business Media.
- MacNair, R. M. (2011). The psychology of peace: An introduction (2nd ed.). Santa Barbara, CA: ABC-CLIO.
- Montiel, C. J., & Noor, N. M. (Eds.) (2009). Peace psychology in Asia. New York: Springer.
- Simić, O., Volčič, Z., & Philpot, C. R. (Eds.) (2012). Peace psychology in the Balkans: Dealing with a violent past while building peace. New York: Springer.
- Sommer, G. & Fuchs, A. (Hrsg.) (2004). Krieg und Frieden: Handbuch der Konflikt- und Friedenspsychologie. Weinheim: Beltz. http://archiv.ub.uni-marburg.de/es/2013/0003/
- Staub, E. (2013). Overcoming evil: Genocide, violent conflict, and terrorism. Oxford: Oxford University Press.
- Tropp, L. R. (Ed.) (2012). The Oxford handbook of intergroup conflict. Oxford: Oxford University Press.

=== Book series ===
- Peace Psychology Book Series

=== Journals ===
- Peace and Conflict: Journal of Peace Psychology
- Journal of Social and Political Psychology
