= Gema Varona =

- Born: Gema Varona Martínez; 1969 (age 55–56); Madrid
- Occupation: criminologist
- Known for: President of the World Society of Victimology

Gema Varona Martínez (Madrid, 1969) is a Spanish criminologist and researcher, recognized for her work in the field of Victimology and Restorative Justice. She is the current director of the Basque Institute of Criminology (IVAC-KREI) and president of the World Society of Victimology (WSV).

== Biography ==
Varona holds a PhD in Criminal Law from the University of the Basque Country / Euskal Herriko Unibertsitatea (UPV/EHU) since 1997. Additionally, she holds a Diploma in criminology and a master's degree in Sociology of Law. She has developed her entire scientific career at the UPV/EHU, where she works as a permanent research doctor.

Varona assumed the leadership of the IVAC-KREI after the elections in October 2023. She was designated president of the World Society of Victimology (WSV) at the 18th symposium held in Gandhinagar, India, having previously served on its executive committee. Previously, she chaired the Basque Society of Victimology for ten years, until June 2024. She is a member of Jakiunde (Academy of Sciences, Arts, and Letters of the Basque Country). She is part of the commission established by the Spanish Ombudsman, Ángel Gabilondo, which is tasked with quantifying the cases of sexual abuse within the Catholic Church in Spain.

Varona's work focuses primarily on Victimology. Her curriculum includes specialization in restorative justice processes. She is a state-level authority in the investigation of ecclesiastical child abuse from a victimological perspective. She co-founded the Betania shelter association (created in 2019), a collective supporting those affected by abuse perpetrated by religious figures. The network of restorative meetings on political violence, coordinated by Varona, was awarded at the European Forum for Restorative Justice.

== Featured Works ==
Beyond scientific articles, she has published several popular science books:

- Criminología conversacional. Postestigos ante la violencia. (2025) ISBN 978-84-1369-916-5
- Victimidad y violencia medioambiental contra los animales. Retos de la victimología verde (2020) ISBN 978-84-1369-024-7
- La mediación reparadora como estrategia de control social. Una perspectiva criminológica (1999)
