= Fixed fantasy =

A fixed fantasy – also known as a "dysfunctional schema" – is a belief or system of beliefs held by a single individual to be genuine, but that cannot be verified in reality. The term is typically applied to individuals suffering from some type of psychiatric dysregulation, most often a personality disorder.

The term is also used in the different context of psychoanalysis to distinguish between a normal transitory one and a fixed fantasy with respect to the fantasised fulfilment in conscious or unconscious thought of the sexualised wish.

== Self-destruction ==
Studies of borderline children often uncovered at the base of their self-destructive behaviour patterns "a "fixed fantasy" ... a rigid, nonreflective scenario of self-induced pain." As part of a psychic defence mechanism, "the omnipotence betrayed by the "fixed fantasy" underlying self-victimization or other forms of self-defeating behaviour ... creates the illusory sense that they are actively producing the abandonment [and] pain", rather than merely suffering it passively – "arranging deceits ... arrang[ing] for blows to fall." Unfortunately "in the course of development, these patterns acquire multiple adaptive functions ... and serve as a key organizer of their sense of self."

"In producing movement away from fixed fantasy systems, commonplace statements are often necessary because the more fixed and extensive the fantasy system, the fewer the transitional opportunities offered; there is little conflicting material to ride. Banalities may be the only resource", as anything more complex may be used to feed back into the fantasy system itself.

=== Basic beliefs and cognitive therapy ===
A fixed fantasy differs from a delusion or delusional system in that, superficially, a fixed fantasy tends to appear plausible, and the person expressing the fantasy is not suffering a break from reality, as occurs in a delusional state. For example, sufferers of obsessive-compulsive personality disorder would believe that "everything has to be perfect" while sufferers of avoidant personality disorder would believe that they are "not good enough". Challenging such "automatic thoughts ... attitudes and basic negative beliefs" is an important part of cognitive therapy.

=== Religion ===
A fixed fantasy also differs from religion or superstition in that these are culturally bound, whereas a fixed fantasy is specific to an individual. In and of themselves, fixed fantasies are not necessarily harmful, but they can interfere with an individual's ability to develop a coherent and integrated life experience.

== Psychosexual ==
In a disciplinary distinct usage (though one equally dependent upon emotional conditioning, upon how "emotions can become associated and linked together ... an automatic switch,") the term fixed fantasy has also been used in respect of psychosexual phantasies – conscious and unconscious.

"In rare cases, a person can become so fixed on a particular fantasy that he or she cannot become aroused without it." Such fantasies underpin much perversion, where "the perverse and fixed "scenario" ... is as much a defence against the anxieties associated with alternative fantasies as it is with the gaining of satisfaction." Robert Stoller considered such fixed fantasies to structure "one's preferred erotic script ... at the centre of which is a remembered (not always consciously remembered, however) bad experience or relationship in early childhood." The fixed fantasy is "a primal daydream that summarises the person's erotic preferences and mirrors that person's whole character structure."

== See also ==
- Aaron Beck
- Albert Ellis
- Archetype
- Fixation
- Life Script
- Idée fixe (psychology)
- Psychological trauma
