= Victim blaming =

Social phenomenon

Victim blaming occurs when the victim of a crime or any wrongful act is held entirely or partially at fault for the harm done to them. There is historical and current prejudice against the victims of domestic violence and sex crimes, such as the greater tendency to blame victims of rape than victims of robbery if victims and perpetrators knew each other prior to the commission of the crime. The Gay Panic Defense has been characterized as a form of victim blaming.

== Origin of the phrase ==
Psychologist William Ryan popularized the phrase "blaming the victim" in the 1969 book Distress in the city, an anthology of essays which he edited. He contributed the final three essays to the anthology, the last of which is entitled Fretting About the Poor. His essay comprises two sections, Blaming the Victim and Money and Power. In the former section Ryan described blaming the victim as "an intellectual process whereby a social problem is analyzed in such a way that the causation is found to be in the qualities and characteristics of the victim rather than in any deficiencies or structural defects in his environment." He continued:

"In addition, it is usually found that these characteristics are not inherent or genetic but are, rather, socially determined. They are stigmas of social origin and are therefore no fault of the victim himself. He is to be pitied, not censured, but nevertheless his problems are to be defined as rooted basically in his own characteristics. ... 'Blaming the victim' is differentiated from old-fahioned conservative ideological formulations, such as Social Darwinism, racial inferiority, and quasi-Calvinist notions of the prospering elect. It is a liberal ideology."

In 1971, Ryan had published his book Blaming the victim to refute Daniel Patrick Moynihan's 1965 work The Negro Family: The Case for National Action (usually simply referred to as the Moynihan Report). Ryan proposed that the ideology of blaming the victim comprises four stages:

"First, identify a social problem. Second, study those affected by the problem and discover in what ways they are different from the rest of us as a consequence of deprivation and injustice. Third, define the differences as the cause of the social problem itself. Finally, of course, assign a government bureaucrat to invent a humanitarian action program to correct the differences."

Moynihan had concluded that three centuries of oppression of black people, and in particular with what he calls the uniquely cruel structure of American slavery as opposed to its Latin American counterparts, had created a long series of chaotic disruptions within the black family structure which, at the time of the report, manifested itself in high rates of unwed births, absent fathers, and single-mother households in black families. Moynihan then correlated these familial outcomes, which he considered undesirable, to the relatively poorer rates of employment, educational achievement, and financial success found among the black population. The black family structure is also being affected by media through the children. The Black family is usually portrayed as gang affiliated, single-parent or very violent. Aggression and violent behavior in children has been linked to television programming. Moynihan advocated the implementation of government programs designed to strengthen the black nuclear family.

Ryan objected that Moynihan then located the proximate cause of the plight of black Americans in the prevalence of a family structure in which the father was sporadically, if at all, present, and the mother was often dependent on government aid to feed, clothe, and provide medical care for her children. Ryan's critique cast the Moynihan theory as an attempt to divert responsibility for poverty from social structural factors to the behaviors and cultural patterns of the poor. However, after he had retired, Ryan expressed his misgiving about his phrase Blaming the victim. He opined: "maybe it was an unfortunate phrase."

== History ==
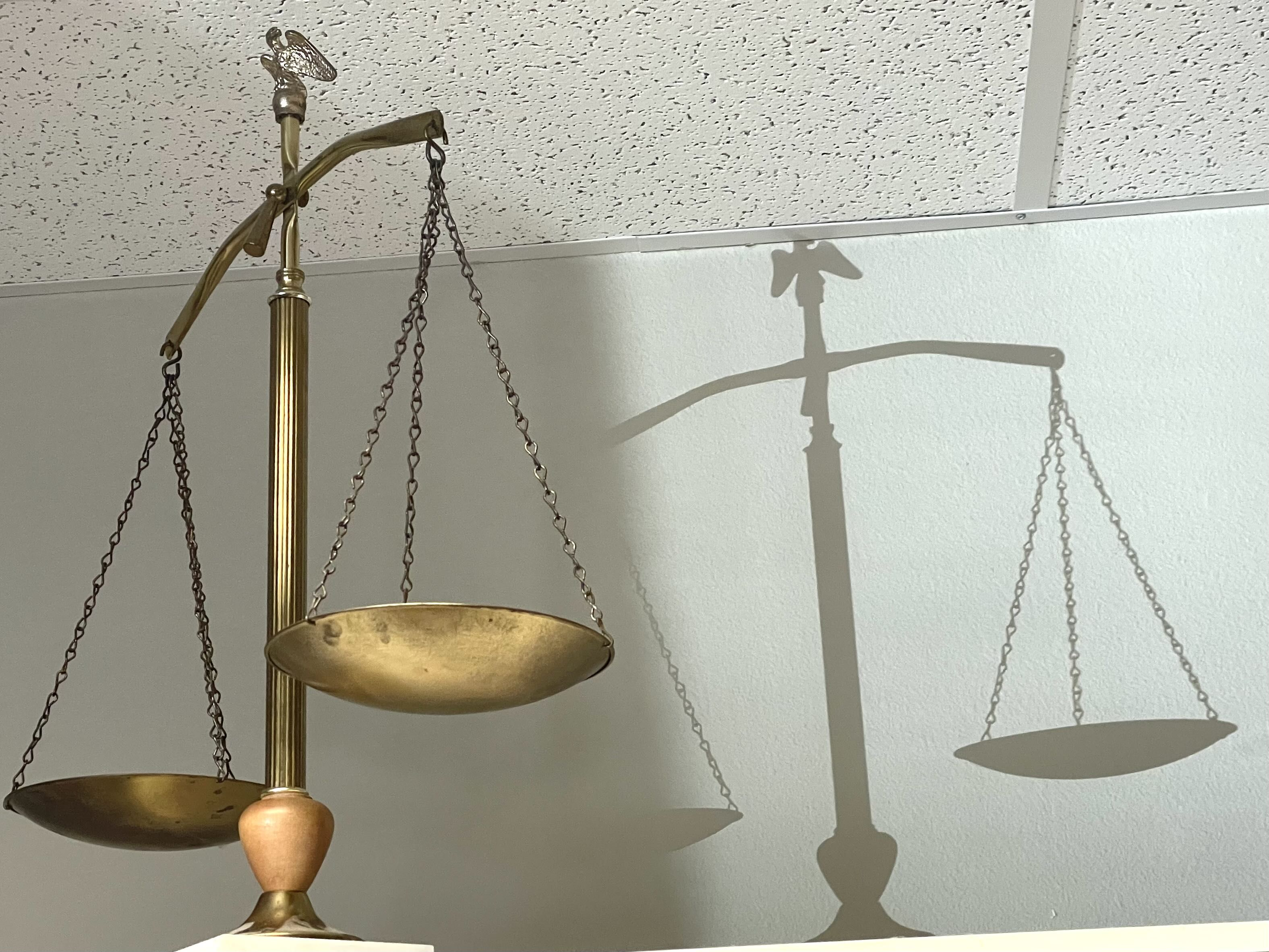
Scales of justice and shadows they cast when seen from below may seem slanted

Although Ryan popularized the phrase, Robinson (2002) claimed that other scholars had identified the phenomenon of victim blaming. In 1947 Theodor W. Adorno defined what would be later called "blaming the victim," as "one of the most sinister features of the Fascist character".

Shortly thereafter, Adorno and three other professors at the University of California, Berkeley formulated their influential and highly debated F-scale (F for fascist), published in The Authoritarian Personality (1950), which included among the fascist traits of the scale the "contempt for everything discriminated against or weak." Typical expressions of victim blaming are the idiomatic statement "She was asking for it", or the question "Why didn't she leave?", said of a victim of violence or sexual assault.

The just-world fallacy is proposed as one explanation for victim blaming: it rejects the disquieting idea that bad things undeservedly happen to people; in its place is the more comforting notion that victims must have done something to deserve their fate. A corollary is that one can avoid becoming a victim by behaving correctly. Though an ancient idea, the just-world fallacy was revived by social psychology in the 1960s, beginning with Melvin J. Lerner.

== Secondary victimization of sexual and other assault victims ==
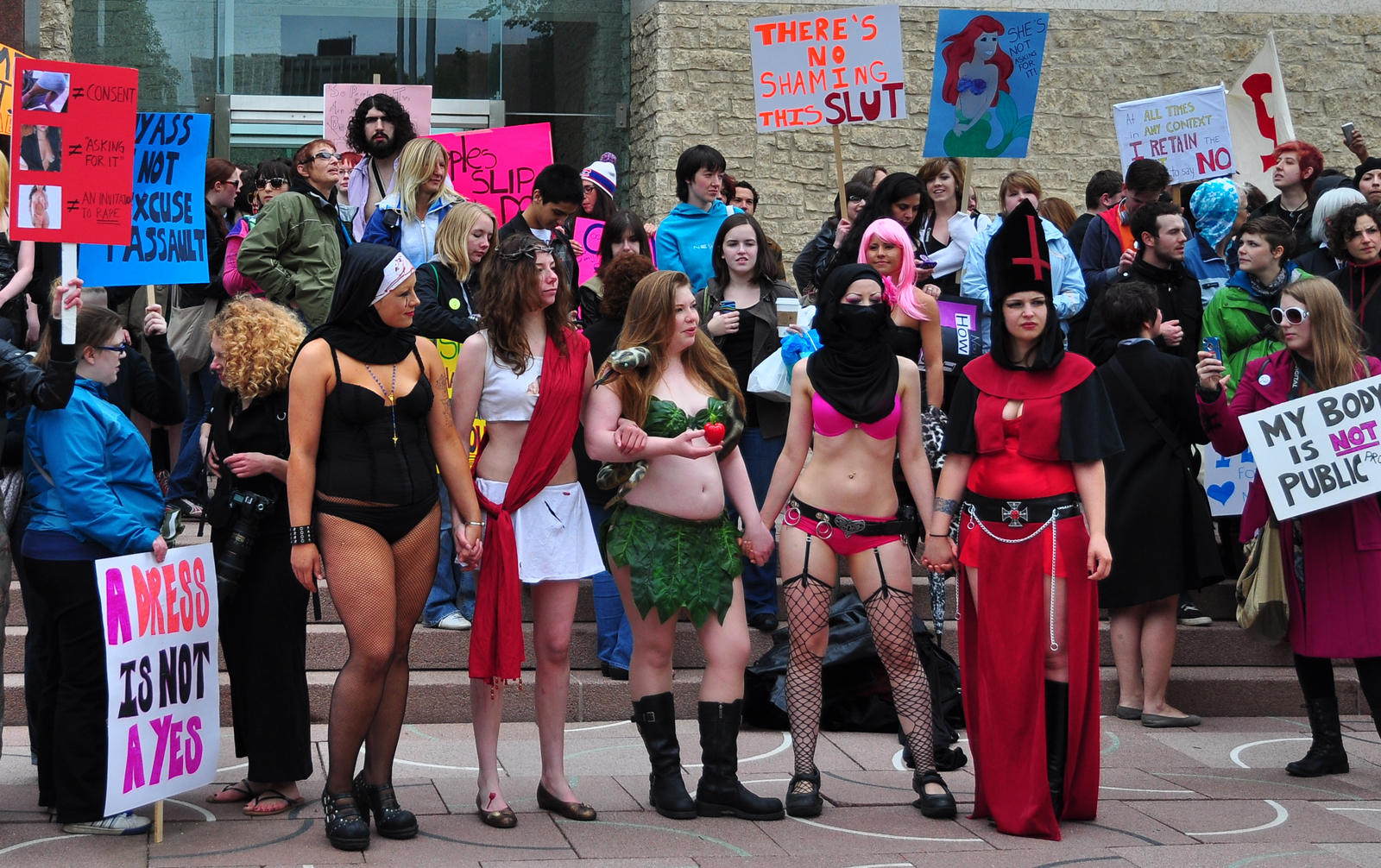
In 2011, hundreds gathered at Edmonton's Alberta Legislature grounds and at Edmonton City Hall (shown here) to protest against victim blaming.

Secondary victimization is the re-traumatization of a victim through the responses of individuals and institutions. Types of secondary victimization include victim blaming, disbelieving the victim's story, minimizing the severity of the attack, and inappropriate post-assault treatment by medical personnel or other organizations. Secondary victimization is especially common in cases of military sexual trauma and drug-facilitated, acquaintance, and statutory rape.

Sexual assault victims may experience stigmatization based on rape myths. A female rape victim is especially stigmatized in patrilineal cultures with strong customs and taboos regarding sex and sexuality. For example, a society may view a female rape victim (especially one who was previously a virgin) as "damaged". Victims in these cultures may suffer isolation, physical and psychological abuse, slut-shaming, public humiliation rituals, be disowned by friends and family, be prohibited from marrying, be divorced if already married, or even be killed. Even in many developed countries, including some sectors of United States society, misogyny remains culturally ingrained. A 2009 study in the Journal of Interpersonal Violence of male victims of sexual assault concludes that male rape victim blaming is usually done so because of social constructs of masculinity. Some effects of this kind of rape cases include a loss of masculinity, confusion about their sexual orientation, and a sense of failure in behaving as men should. Victims of an unwanted sexual encounter usually develop psychological problems such as depression or sexual violence specific PTSD known as rape trauma syndrome.

One example of an allegation against female victims of sexual assault is that they were wearing provocative clothing and thus actively trying to seduce a sexual partner. Such accusations against victims stem from the assumption that sexually revealing clothing conveys consent for sexual actions, irrespective of willful verbal consent. Research has yet to prove that attire is a significant causal factor in determining who is assaulted.

Victim blaming is also exemplified when a victim of sexual assault is found at fault for performing actions which reduce their ability to resist or refuse consent, such as consuming alcohol. Victim advocacy groups and medical professionals are educating young adults on the definition of consent, and the importance of refraining from victim blaming. Most institutions have adopted the concept of affirmative consent and that refraining from sexual activity while under the influence is the safest choice.

In efforts to discredit alleged sexual assault victims in court, a defense attorney may delve into an accuser's personal history, a common practice that also has the purposeful effect of making the victim so uncomfortable they choose not to proceed. This attack on character, especially one pointing out promiscuity, makes the argument that women who lead "high-risk" lifestyles (promiscuity, drug use) are not real victims of rape. Research on the acceptance of rape myths has shown that sexism is a significant factor in the blaming of female rape victims.

=== Ideal victim ===
An ideal victim is one who is afforded the status of victimhood due to unavoidable circumstances that put the individual at a disadvantage. One can apply this theory to any crime, including and especially sexual assault. Nils Christie, a Norwegian criminology professor, has theorized about the concept of the ideal victim since the 1980s. In his research he gives two examples: one of an old woman who is attacked on her way home from visiting her family and the other of a man who is attacked at a bar by someone he knew. He describes the old woman as an ideal victim because she could not avoid being in the location that she was, she did not know her attacker, and she could not fight off her attacker. The man, however, could have avoided being at a bar, knew his attacker, and should have been able to fight off his attacker, being younger and a man.

When applying the ideal victim theory to sexual assault victims, often judicial proceedings define an ideal victim as one who resists their attacker and exercises caution in risky situations, despite law reforms to extinguish these fallacious requirements. When victims are not ideal, they are at risk for being blamed for their attack because they are not considered real victims of rape.

A victim who is not considered an ideal, or real victim, is one who leads a "high-risk" lifestyle, partaking in drugs or alcohol, or is perceived as promiscuous. A victim who intimately knows their attacker is also not considered an ideal victim. An example of a sexual assault victim who is not ideal is a prostitute because they lead a high-risk lifestyle. The perception is that these behaviors discount the credibility of a sexual assault victim's claim or that the behaviors and associations create the mistaken assumption of consent. Some of or all of the blame of the assault is then placed on these victims, and so they are not worthy of having their case presented in court. These perceptions persist in court rulings despite a shift in laws favoring affirmative consent – meaning that the participants in a sexual activity give a verbal affirmation rather than one participant who neither answers negatively nor positively. In other words, affirmative consent is yes means yes, no means no and no verbal answer also means no.

According to Christie's theory, there are five main attributes to determine whether a victim would be seen by the public as ideal. The first is weakness, seen through being sick, old, or very young. Helplessness is a synonym of weakness, which explains why society would deem weak groups as easier to support as being ideal victims. Second, Christie identifies that a victim who is engaging in behaviors understood as socially acceptable or socially praised is ideal. With his example of an elderly woman caring for her sick sister, the woman's behavior of caring for someone sick is socially praised, further determining her as an ideal victim. Third is the lack of environmental factors. When reexamining Christie's elderly woman example, she was walking in broad daylight. Studies have shown that attacks on women over 18 occur more frequently at night, peaking at 11pm, so being attacked during the day as an elderly woman would remove the factor of night-time attacks and further present the woman as an ideal victim. The other two factors pertain to the attacker, with Christie stating that an attacker who is "big and bad" and has no relation to the victim further results in society seeing the victim as the ideal type of victim to rally behind and support.

In addition to an ideal victim, there must be an ideal perpetrator for a crime to be considered ideal. The ideal attacker does not know their victim and is a completely non-sympathetic figure—one who is considered sub-human, an individual lacking morals. An attacker that knows their victim is not considered an ideal attacker, nor is someone who seems morally ordinary. Cases of intimate partner violence are not considered ideal because the victim knows their attacker. Husbands and wives are not ideal victims or perpetrators because they are intimately familiar with each other.

== Global situation ==
Many different cultures across the globe have formulated different degrees of victim blaming for different scenarios such as rape, hate crimes, and domestic abuse. Victim blaming is common around the world, especially in cultures where it is socially acceptable and advised to treat certain groups of people as lesser. For example, in Somalia victims of sexual abuse consistently endure social ostracization and harassment. One specific example is the kidnapping and rape of 14-year old Fatima: when the police arrived, both Fatima and her rapist were arrested. While they did not detain the offender for long, the officers held Fatima captive for a month and a prison guard continually raped her during that time.

In February 2016, the organisations International Alert and UNICEF published a study revealing that girls and women released from captivity by Nigeria's insurgency group Boko Haram often face rejection by their communities and families. Their children born of sexual violence faced even more discrimination.

Acid attacks on women in South Asia, when people throw acid on women in an attempt to punish them for their perceived wrongdoings, are another example of victim-blaming. For instance, in New Delhi in 2005, a group of men threw acid on a 16-year-old girl because they believed she provoked the advances of a man. In Chinese culture, victim blaming is often associated with the crime of rape, as women are expected to resist rape using physical force. Thus, if rape occurs, it is considered to be at least partly the woman's fault and her virtue is inevitably called into question. Religious norms can be part of victim blaming.

A recent example of Western victim blaming includes a civil trial held in 2013, where the Los Angeles School District blamed a 14-year-old girl for the sexual abuse she endured from her middle school teacher. The District's lawyer argued that the minor was responsible for the prevention of the abuse, putting the entire fault on the victim and exempting the perpetrator of any responsibility. Despite his efforts to convince the court that the victim must be blamed, the ruling stated that no minor student that has been sexually assaulted by his or her teacher is responsible for the prevention of that sexual assault.

== Opposing views ==
Roy Baumeister, a social and personality psychologist, argued that blaming the victim is not necessarily always fallacious. He argued that showing the victim's possible role in an altercation may be contrary to typical explanations of violence and cruelty, which incorporate the trope of the innocent victim. According to Baumeister, in the classic telling of "the myth of pure evil," the innocent, well-meaning victims are going about their business when they are suddenly assaulted by wicked, malicious evildoers. Baumeister describes the situation as a possible distortion by both the perpetrator and the victim; the perpetrator may minimize the offense while the victim maximizes it, and so accounts of the incident should not be immediately taken as objective truths.

In context, Baumeister refers to the common behavior of the aggressor seeing themselves as more of the "victim" than the abused, justifying a horrific act by way of their "moral complexity". This usually stems from an "excessive sensitivity" to insults, which he finds as a consistent pattern in abusive husbands. Essentially, the abuse the perpetrator administers is generally excessive, in comparison to the act/acts that they claim as to have provoked them.

== Scientific studies on victim blaming ==
A 2017 review by Lennon et al. found that women who wear immodest or sexual clothing self-objectify themselves, which causes anxiety, unhappiness, body-dissatisfaction, and body shame. They found that "[o]bservers link wearing sexy dress to violence including sexual coercion, sexual harassment, sexual assault, and unwelcome groping, touching, and grabbing." However, only two studies under their review directly investigated dress and real experience of sexual assault; neither study found a connection. Lennon et al. noted that few researchers had studied the influence of actual sexual behavior on potential relationships between sexual violence and dress. One exception was a 2007 study of flashing at college homecoming events, in which Annette Lynch found that "a dress style which might be considered not provocative becomes provocative when the behavior of the woman wearing it becomes suggestive (i.e., when she flashes)" and women who attended homecoming matches were often groped and coerced into exposing themselves. Victim blaming was found to contribute to the men's mental health crisis.

== Horseshoe theory and nonpolarized views ==
Some scholars make the argument that some of the attitudes that are described as victim blaming and the victimologies that are said to counteract them are both extreme and similar to each other, an example of the horseshoe theory. For instance, they argue that the claim that "women wearing provocative clothing cause rape" is as demeaning to men as it is to women as depicting men as incapable of controlling their sexual desire is misandrist and denies men full agency, while also arguing that the generalization that women do not lie about rape (or any generalization about women not doing some things because of their gender) is misogynist by its implicit assumption that women act by simple default action modes which is incompatible with full agency. These scholars argue that it is important to impartially assess the evidence in each criminal trial individually and that any generalization based on statistics would change the situation from one where the control of evidence makes false reporting difficult to one where lack of individual control of the alleged crime makes it easier to file false reports and that statistics collected in the former situation would not be possible to apply to the latter situation.

While the scholars make a distinction between actual victim blaming and rule by law that they consider to be falsely lumped with victim blaming in radical feminist rhetorics, they also advocate more protection from ad hominem questions to alleged victims about past life history and that the questions should focus on what is relevant for the specific alleged crime. They also cite examples that they consider to be cases of the horseshoe theory applied to the question of victim blaming. This includes cases in which psychologists who have testified on behalf of the prosecution in trials in which breast size have been used as a measure of female age when classifying pornographic cartoons as child pornography and been praised by feminists for it, and later the same psychologists have used the same psychological arguments when testifying on behalf of the defense in statutory rape cases and getting the defendant acquitted by claiming that the victim's breasts looked like those of an adult woman (considered by these scholars to be victim blaming based on appearance) and been praised by men's rights groups for it. It also includes the possibility that biopsychiatric models that consider sexual criminality hereditary and that are advocated by some feminists may blame victims of incest abuse for being genetically related to their abusers and thereby dissuading them from reporting abuse.

Other analysts of victim blaming discourse who neither support most of the phenomena that are described as victim blaming nor most of the measures that are marketed as countermeasures against such point at the existence of other ways of discovering and punishing crimes with victims besides the victim reporting the crime. Not only are there police patrols and possible eyewitnesses, but these analysts also argue that neighbors can overhear and report crimes that take place within the house such as domestic violence. For that reason along with the possibility of many witnesses turning up over time if the crime is ongoing long term as domestic abuse is generally said to be which would make some of the witnesses likely to be considered believable, analysts of this camp of thought argue that the main problem that prevent crimes from being successfully prosecuted is offender profiling that disbelieve the capacity and/or probability of many criminals to commit the crime, rather than disbelief or blaming of victim reports.

These analysts cite international comparisons that show that the percentage of male on female cases in the statistics of successfully prosecuted domestic violence is not higher in countries that apply gender feminist theories about patriarchal structures than in countries that apply supposedly antifeminist evolutionary psychology profiling of sex differences in aggressiveness, impulse control and empathy, arguing that the criminal justice system prioritizing cases in which they believe the suspect most likely to be guilty makes evolutionary psychology at least as responsible as gender feminism for leaving domestic violence cases with female offenders undiscovered no matter if the victim is male or female. The analysts argue that many problems that are often attributed to victim blaming are instead due to offender profiling, and suggest randomized investigations instead of psychological profiling of suspected offenders.

== Examples ==
A myth holds that Jews went passively "like sheep to the slaughter" during The Holocaust, which is considered by many writers, including Emil Fackenheim, to be a form of victim blaming. Secondary antisemitism is a type of antisemitism caused by non-Jewish Europeans' attempts to shift blame for the Holocaust onto the Jews, often summed up by the claim that "The Germans will never forgive the Jews for Auschwitz."

In recent years, the issue of victim blaming has gained notoriety and become widely recognized in the media, particularly in the context of feminism, as women have often been blamed for behaving in ways that are claimed to encourage harassment.

=== Australia ===
Leigh Leigh, born Leigh Rennea Mears, was a 14-year-old girl from Fern Bay, New South Wales, Australia, who was murdered on 3 November 1989. While attending a 16-year-old boy's birthday party at Stockton Beach, Leigh was assaulted by a group of boys after she returned distressed from a sexual encounter on the beach that a reviewing judge later called non-consensual. After being kicked and spat on by the group, Leigh left the party. Her naked body was found in the sand dunes nearby the following morning, with severe genital damage and a crushed skull. Leigh's murder received considerable attention in the media. Initially focusing on her sexual assault and murder, media attention later concentrated more on the lack of parental supervision and the drugs and alcohol at the party, and on Leigh's sexuality. The media coverage of the murder has been cited as an example of victim blaming.

In 1997, the Sydney Daily Telegraph, a conservative tabloid opposition to the Sydney Morning Herald and The Australian, interviewed anti-LGBT+ school bullies who claimed their gay student victims 'were asking for it' with their camp behaviour, insinuating that they were bringing upon themselves mistreatment at the hands of students and staff at their schools. The Telegraph devoted its entire front page to the Christopher Tsakalos lawsuit, with the imperative headline "Walk Like a Man". Reporters from the Daily Telegraph also pursued the Tsakalos story in an article titled "Gay boy asked for it — students" (Trute & Angelo, 1997).

Former Australian Senator Fraser Anning was sharply criticised for his comments about the Christchurch mosque shootings in New Zealand, in which 51 Muslim worshippers were killed. He claimed that immigration of "Muslim fanatics" led to the attacks, and that "while Muslims may have been victims today, usually they are the perpetrators". Anning also stated that the massacre "highlights...the growing fear within our community...of the increasing Muslim presence". The comments received international attention and were overwhelmingly criticised as being insensitive and racist, and sympathetic to the views of the perpetrator.

In some Common Law jurisdictions such as the UK, Canada, and several Australian states, the defense of provocation is only available against a charge of murder and only acts to reduce the conviction to manslaughter. Until recently criminal courts have regarded sexual infidelity such as adultery and fornication as sufficiently grave provocation as to provide a warrant, indeed a 'moral warrant', for reducing murder to manslaughter. While the warrant has spilled over into diminished responsibility defences, wounding, grievous bodily harm and attempted murder cases, it is provocation cases that have provided the precedents enshrining a defendant's impassioned homicidal sexual infidelity tale as excusatory. Periodically, judges and law reformers attempt to rein in provocation defences, most recently in England and Wales where provocation has been replaced by a loss of control defence that, most controversially, specifically excludes sexual infidelity as a trigger for loss of control.

=== Germany ===
The New Year's Eve sexual assaults in Germany took place in 2016 where large groups of men assaulted multiple women, mayor of Cologne Henriette Reker came under heavy criticism, as her response appeared to blame the victims. She called for women to follow a "code of conduct," including staying at an "arm's length" from strangers. By the evening of 5 January, #einearmlänge ('an arm's length') became one of Germany's top-trending hashtags on Twitter. Reker called a crisis meeting with the police in response to the incidents. Reker called it "completely improper" to link the perpetrators to refugees.

=== Italy ===
Coverage of the 2016 Murder of Ashley Ann Olsen, an American murdered in Italy during a sexual encounter with a Senegalese immigrant, focused on the victim blaming in cross-cultural encounters.

=== India ===
In a case that attracted worldwide coverage, when a woman was raped and killed in Delhi in December 2012, some Indian government officials and political leaders blamed the victim for various things, mostly based on conjecture. Many of the people involved later apologized.

In August 2017, the hashtag #AintNoCinderella trended on social media in India, in response to a high-profile instance of victim-blaming. After Varnika Kundu was stalked and harassed by two men on her way home late at night, Bharatiya Janata Party Vice President Ramveer Bhatti addressed the incident with a claim that Kundu was somehow at fault for being out late by herself. Social media users took to Twitter and Instagram to challenge the claim that women should not be out late at night, and if they are, they are somehow "asking for it". Hundreds of women shared photos of themselves staying out past midnight, dressing boldly, and behaving in (harmless) ways that tend to be condemned in old-fashioned, anti-feminist ideology.

=== Jordan ===
Women in Jordan have been victim-blamed for sexual harassment for not wearing a hijab.

=== United States ===
In 1938 the Madera Tribune ran the front-page headline "Mother Blames her Daughter Equally with Man for Murder" in describing the stabbing death of 19-year-old Leona Vlught in Oakland. The victim's mother's "resentment against the boy who killed her" was said to be softened upon learning that her daughter drank alcohol and "went on a petting party when she was supposed to be spending the night with girl friends". The perpetrator Rodney Greig was later convicted of the crime and executed in the San Quentin gas chamber.

In 1947, North Carolina Governor R. Gregg Cherry commuted the death sentences of four men convicted of gang raping a woman. Calvin Covington, Granger Thompson, Stacy Powell, and Cliff Inman had been convicted of raping Dorothy Frye in Lumberton in March 1946. Despite the racial dynamics (all four rapists were black and Frye was white), the crime had drawn less outcry since Frye had entered Lumberton's black section to buy liquor her husband was a union organizer. She was gang raped after her husband left her waiting in the car. In reducing the sentences of the four convicted rapists to life imprisonment, Cherry blamed the victim.

"After careful consideration, I am convinced that the death penalty is too severe in this case. I believe that the prosecutrix by her own misconduct and failure to observe a sense of propriety placed herself in such a situation as to create a temptation for the defendants to mistreat her and to make her an easy victim of their beastly lusts."

In a 2010 case, an 11-year-old female rape victim who suffered repeated gang rapes in Cleveland, Texas, was accused by a defense attorney of being a seductress who lured men to their doom. "Like the spider and the fly. Wasn't she saying, 'Come into my parlor', said the spider to the fly?", he asked a witness. The New York Times ran an article uncritically reporting on the way many in the community blamed the victim, for which the newspaper later apologized.

In October 2023, public policy advocate Ryan Carson was murdered in Brooklyn, which some online attributed to his progressive views.

== Urban planning and road safety ==
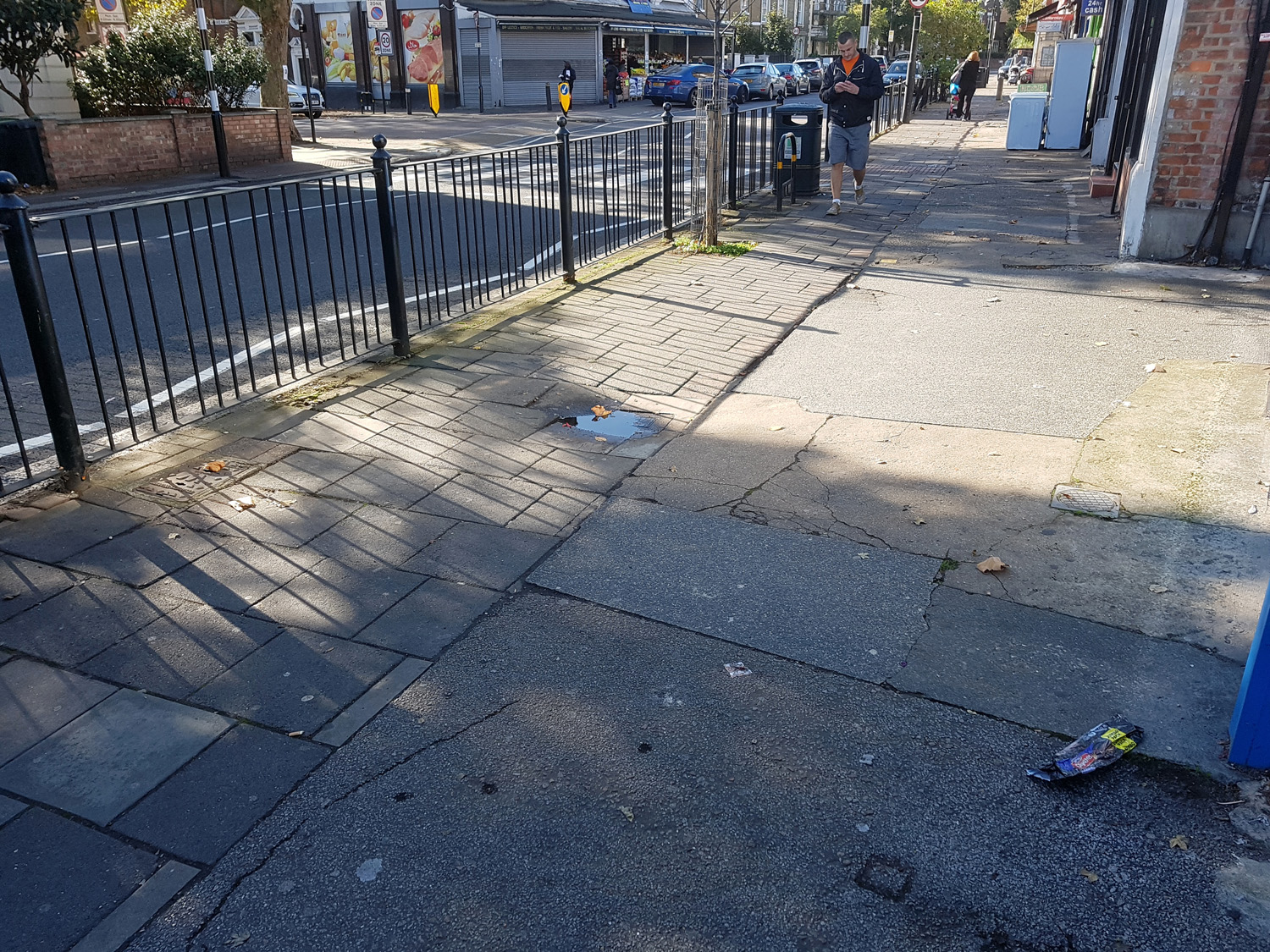
Pedestrian "protection" fences, an example of victim-blaming. Far from protecting pedestrians, they only hinder pedestrian permeability and encourage cars to maintain high speeds.

Cars not only are responsible for the majority of accidents but also cause more severe ones. However, urban design often continues to favor car circulation, impeding pedestrian and cyclist mobility and placing blame on the victims for those accidents.

As the majority of traffic accident victims are pedestrians and cyclists, measures to calm traffic and protect and facilitate the mobility of the most vulnerable should be implemented to avoid shifting responsibility.

== See also ==
- Abusive power and control
- Backlash (sociology)
- Battered woman syndrome
- Ben Franklin effect#Converse
- Blame
- Bullying
- Contributory negligence
- Crime
- Crime of passion
- DARVO
- Demonization
- Denial
- Divine retribution
- Epistemic injustice
- False accusation
- Frontier justice
- Gaslighting
- Gray rape
- Guilt trip
- Hybristophilia
- Incel
- Injustice
- Just world fallacy
- Labeling theory
- Mind games
- Mitigating factor
- Negativity bias
- Post-assault treatment of sexual assault victims
- Presumption of guilt
- Provocation (legal)
- Psychological projection
- Rape shield law
- Rationalization (psychology)
- Scapegoating
- Schadenfreude
- Self-serving bias
- Smear campaign
- Victimology
- Victim mentality
- Victim playing
- Victimisation
- Volenti non fit injuria
