= Shattered assumptions theory =

Theory in social psychology

In social psychology, shattered assumptions theory proposes that experiencing traumatic events can change how victims and survivors view themselves and the world. Specifically, the theory – published by Ronnie Janoff-Bulman in 1992 – concerns the effect that negative events have on three inherent assumptions: overall benevolence of the world, meaningfulness of the world, and self worth. These fundamental beliefs are the bedrock of our conceptual system and are the assumptions we are least aware of and least likely to challenge. They constitute our "assumptive world," defined as "a strongly held set of assumptions about the world and the self which is confidently maintained and used as a means of recognizing, planning, and acting" by C. M. Parkes. According to Janoff-Bulman, traumatic life events shatter these core assumptions, and coping involves rebuilding a viable assumptive world.

== History ==
The theory of shattered assumptions was developed and detailed by psychologist Ronnie Janoff-Bulman in her 1992 book Shattered Assumptions: Towards a New Psychology of Trauma. Her early research focused on victimization and trauma. Since then, this theory has been widely researched and has since connected to other psychological theories such as terror management theory.

== Basic assumptions ==
According to Janoff-Bulman, people generally hold three fundamental assumptions about the world that are built and confirmed over years of experience: the world is benevolent, the world is meaningful, and I am worthy. These are tacit assumptions that serve as a basis of our well-being and our guides in navigating daily life. Together these assumptions provide us with a sense of relative invulnerability that enables us to awake each morning and face the day. Thus in her book Janoff-Bulman notes that the most common response she heard when doing research with very different victim populations was, "I never thought it could happen to me." Brewin & Holmes expand this list to five main assumptions, adding the world is predictable, and the assumption of invulnerability. The belief in predictability is represented in Janoff-Bulman's meaningfulness assumption, and invulnerability is afforded by the three fundamental assumptions she posits. There is therefore consistency across the two views.

=== The world is benevolent ===
This assumption concerns one's overall impression of the goodness or virtue of the world. This constitutes two sub-assumptions: the benevolence of the world as an entity, and the benevolence of the people in that world. The benevolence of the world and people refer to the world and people close to us rather than the larger, distant impersonal world. These core beliefs begin to develop through early interactions with caregivers. These two ideas can develop independently through selecting experiences, but aren't exempt from influencing one another. Measuring this type of assumption has been done using the Negative Cognitions about the World subscale of the Posttraumatic Cognitions Inventory.

=== The world is meaningful ===
The second fundamental assumption addresses not only why events happen in our world, but why they happen to specific people. A meaningful world is one that makes sense--it is one in which we can see the contingency between a person and their outcomes. In other words, an outcome, positive or negative, makes sense when it corresponds to the person's behavior or character; such a world is predictable and what happens to us is not random. When an unjust event happens to an 'undeserving' person it is viewed as unfair or wrong. On the flipside, it is assumed that a good person encounters positive events, and that careful people who engage in the right behaviors can avoid negative outcome such as serious illness or debilitating accidents. Bad, careless people are expected to experience negative events. When a person who is good in the eyes of their loved ones dies young of an illness, it seems unfair, particularly to the loved ones of the deceased. Thus, the early death of someone who is "deserving of good things" can shatter the assumption that the world is meaningful or logical.

=== The self is worthy ===
The final fundamental assumption evaluates one's self as a positive, moral, and decent--and thus deserving of good outcomes in life. Individuals' assessment of their self-worth contributes to their success in life. A person's positive self-worth encourages them to be effective in their tasks at hand. Generally, this assumption enables an individual to maintain a belief that s/he has the ability to control positive or negative outcomes.

== Shattered assumptions ==
According to the theory, there are some extreme events that shatter these worldviews. They severely challenge and break assumptions about the world and oneself. Examples of such events might be the unwarranted murder of a loved one, being critically injured, or being physically or emotionally abused by others. Such events are particularly traumatic for people who have had a generally positive life. Because these people have such strong, optimistic assumptions, the disintegration of these views can be more traumatic.

=== Rebuilding assumptions ===
Once one has experienced such assumption-shattering trauma, it is necessary for an individual to create new assumptions or modify their old ones to recover from the traumatic experience. Therefore, the negative effects of the trauma are simply related to our worldviews, and if we repair these views, we will recover from the trauma. The psychological effect on an individual due to a traumatizing event will change and disrupt one's basic life assumptions – hence the title "shattered assumption theory". Basic life assumptions are norms that are generally not discussed or even recognized until they are questioned or challenged due to life-changing occurrences, such as criminal assault, serious illness or off-time loss of a loved one. According to Hanson & Janoff-Bulman, even apparently minor victimiations like burglary or robbery can cause intense psychological responses, causing individuals to suffer. Such experience will make an individual question worldviews they had previously taken for granted.

Coping from a traumatic experience is achievable, as long as the victim recognizes how the specific event is shaping their current life and learns new behavior that will change these negative thought patterns. This process begins as the individual starts to "[reestablish] a conceptual system that will allow [them] to once again function effectively; the parts of the conceptual system that have been shaken will have to be rebuilt". Rebuilding one's conceptual system will take time and will be different from one individual to another; but with a strong support system and introspection it is doable. But, these individuals must incorporate their experiences as a victim into their new worldviews. One of the most efficient ways of doing this is to reappraise the victimization itself.

Shattered assumptions can also be rebuilt through therapy. In an article by Eric Schuler and Adriel Boals, the authors were able to associate certain methods of therapy with coping with shattered assumptions. Specifically, they reported that prolonged exposure therapy and cognitive processing therapy can help people rebuild their shattered world. Prolonged exposure therapy allows the patient to reduce negative thoughts by becoming familiar with the traumatic event. Cognitive processing therapy allows the patient to essentially overcome PTSD. This type of therapy allows the patient to understand the traumatic event in a different way allowing them to have more than one outlook on the event. Eventually, the main goal is to allow the patient to have a new positive outlook on the event.

== Evidence ==
Literature supports the hypothesis that those with religious beliefs use them as cognitive schema to conceptualize traumatic events. A religious person's trauma is likely to significantly change their beliefs with those who develop Post-traumatic stress disorder having the largest changes in their religious beliefs.

The most widely used tool used to measure the assumptive world of an individual is the World Assumptions Scale (WAS). In this scale there are 32 items divided into the three major scales. An early version of the scale included eight subscales: benevolence of the world, benevolence of people, controllability, justice, randomness, self-worth, self-control, and luck. Controllability, justice and randomness (reverse-scored) comprise the meaningfulness scale, and self-worth, self-control, and luck (reverse-scored) comprise the self-worth scale. The WAS is used in order to assess the magnitude of disintegration experienced by individuals.

Psychologist Jeremy D. W. Clifton said that although shattered assumptions theory is intuitively appealing, some empirical research asking whether trauma changes what Clifton called primal world beliefs showed small effect sizes.

== Criticism and related theories ==
There are some closely related theories. Terror management theory states that our self-esteem and worldviews serve as a mechanism to avoid the overwhelming fear and anxiety that we would normally face about death and suffering. We need such mechanisms to perform daily functions, as without them we would be too conscious of our own mortality. Like in the theory of shattered assumptions, the more positively individuals view themselves (through high self-esteem) and the world, the less anxiety they will face about death.
