= Gérard Lopez (psychiatrist) =

French psychiatrist

Gérard Lopez (born 1949) is a French psychiatrist specializing in the treatment of psychological trauma and victimology. He is recognized for his early involvement in addressing the mental health needs of victims of abuse and sexual violence in France. Lopez contributed to the development of therapeutic approaches related to rape trauma syndrome, psychological trauma, and the effects and aftermath of rape.

He co-founded the Institut de victimologie in Paris, where he serves as president. Lopez also worked at the forensic psychiatry unit of the Hôtel-Dieu hospital in Paris, where he conducted clinical assessments and supported victims of sexual and domestic violence.
