= Melvin J. Lerner =

American psychologist (born 1929)

- Born: 1929 (age 96–97); Lorain, Ohio
- Education: New York University
- Known for: Contributions to the Just world belief theory
- Scientific career
- Fields: Social psychology
- Workplaces: University of Waterloo

Melvin J. Lerner, Professor of Social Psychology at the University of Waterloo between 1970 and 1994 and now a visiting scholar at Florida Atlantic University, has been called "a pioneer in the psychological study of justice."

== Education ==
Lerner received his Ph.D. in Social Psychology in 1957 at New York University.

== Career ==
After his Ph.D., he was a Post-Doc in Clinical Psychology at Stanford University.

Lerner has been associated with University of California, Berkeley, Washington University in St. Louis, Universities of Utrecht and Leiden in the Netherlands, and other institutions. He was the founding editor of the journal Social Justice Research and the "Critical Issues in Social Justice" series published by Plenum Press.

In 1994, he was awarded Distinguished Professor Emeritus at University of Waterloo. He received the Max-Planck-Forschungspreis together with Leo Montada in 1993 and the Quinquennial Award in 1986. In 2008, he was awarded the Lifetime Achievement Award by the International Society for Justice Research.

=== Belief in a just world ===
Lerner is most recognized for the Just-world phenomenon, published in "The Belief in a Just World: A Fundamental Delusion" (1980), and for being co-editor of the first volume devoted to the "Justice Motive" in 1981.

He began studying justice beliefs and the just world fallacy while exploring the mechanisms behind negative social and societal interactions. Lerner saw his work as extending Stanley Milgram's work on obedience. He wanted to understand how regimes that cause cruelty and suffering maintain popular support, and how people come to accept social norms and laws that produce misery and suffering.

Lerner's research was influenced by repeatedly witnessing the tendency of observers to blame victims for their suffering. During his clinical training as a psychologist, he observed the treatment of mentally ill persons by the health care practitioners with whom he worked. Though he knew the clinicians to be kindhearted, educated people, he observed that they blamed patients for their own suffering. He was also surprised at hearing his students derogate the poor, seemingly oblivious to the structural forces that contribute to poverty. In one of his studies on rewards, he observed that when one of two men was chosen at random to receive a reward for a task, observers felt more praise toward the man who had been randomly rewarded than toward the man who did not receive a reward. Existing social psychological theories, including cognitive dissonance, could not fully explain these phenomena. His desire to understand the processes that caused these phenomena led Lerner to conduct his first experiments on what is now called the just world fallacy.

== See also ==
- Moralistic fallacy
- List of University of Waterloo people
- Victim blaming
